= C. Parker Crowell =

American architect

- Born: December 7, 1876; Orono, Maine
- Died: March 31, 1959 (aged 82); Bangor, Maine
- Occupation: Architect

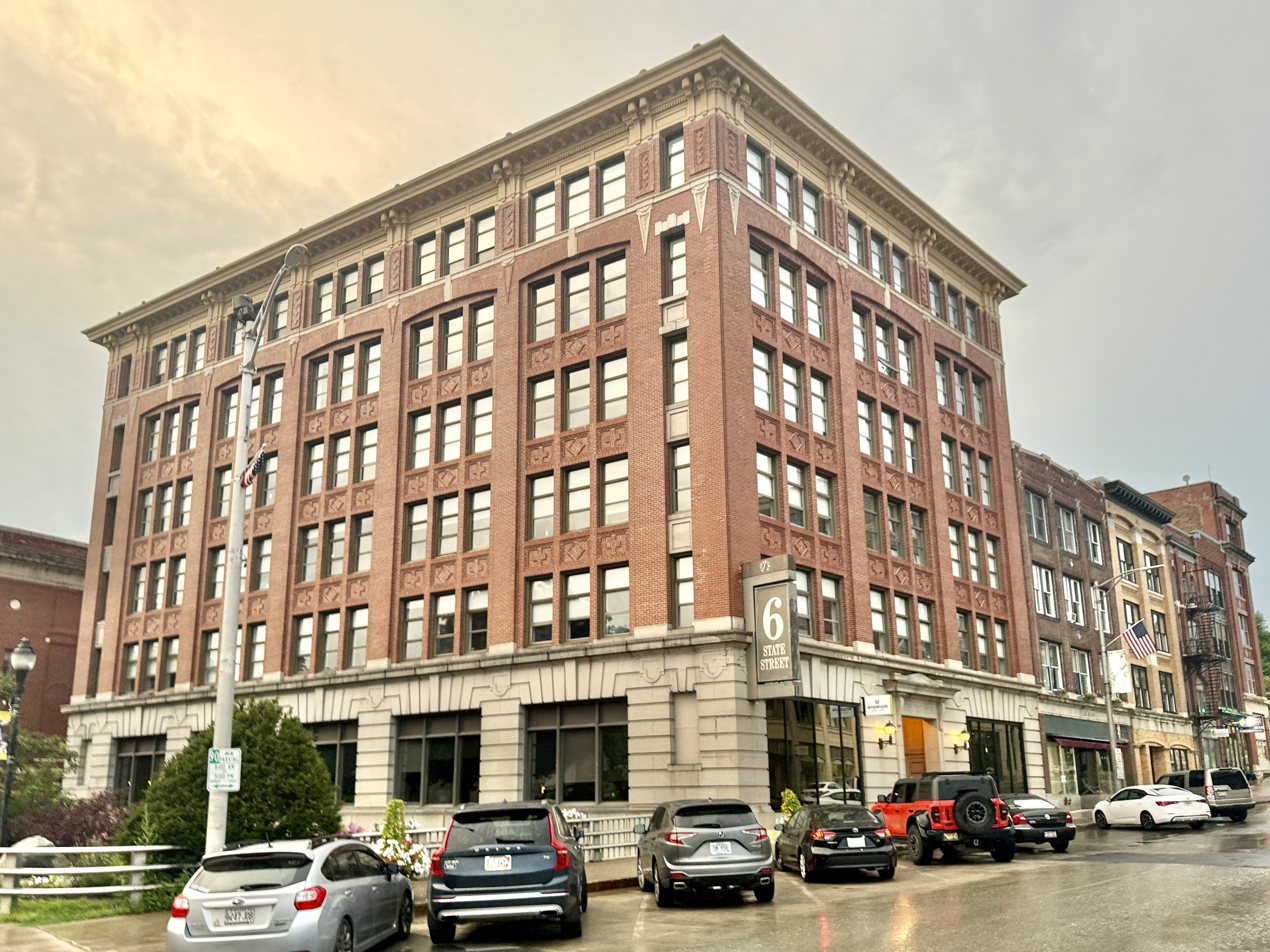
The Eastern Trust Building in Bangor, designed by Crowell and built in 1912.

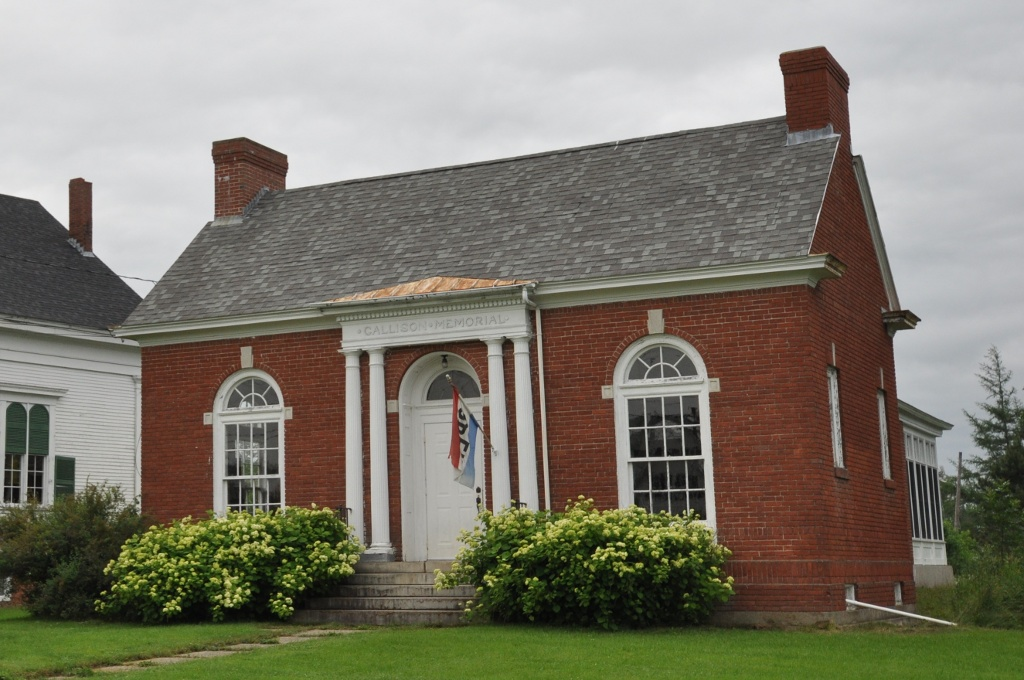
The Gallison Memorial Library in Harrington, completed in 1923.

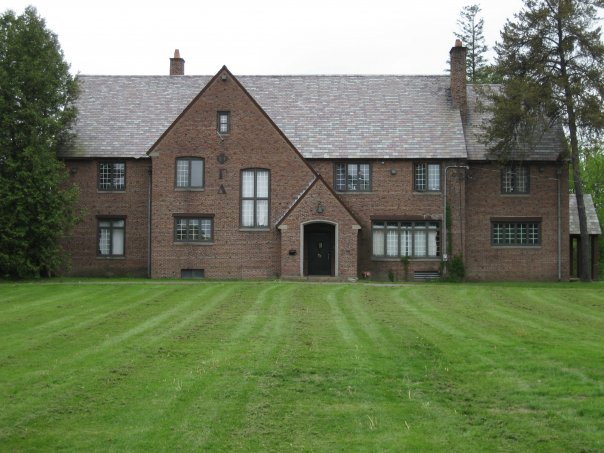
The Phi Gamma Delta House at the University of Maine in Orono, built in 1925.

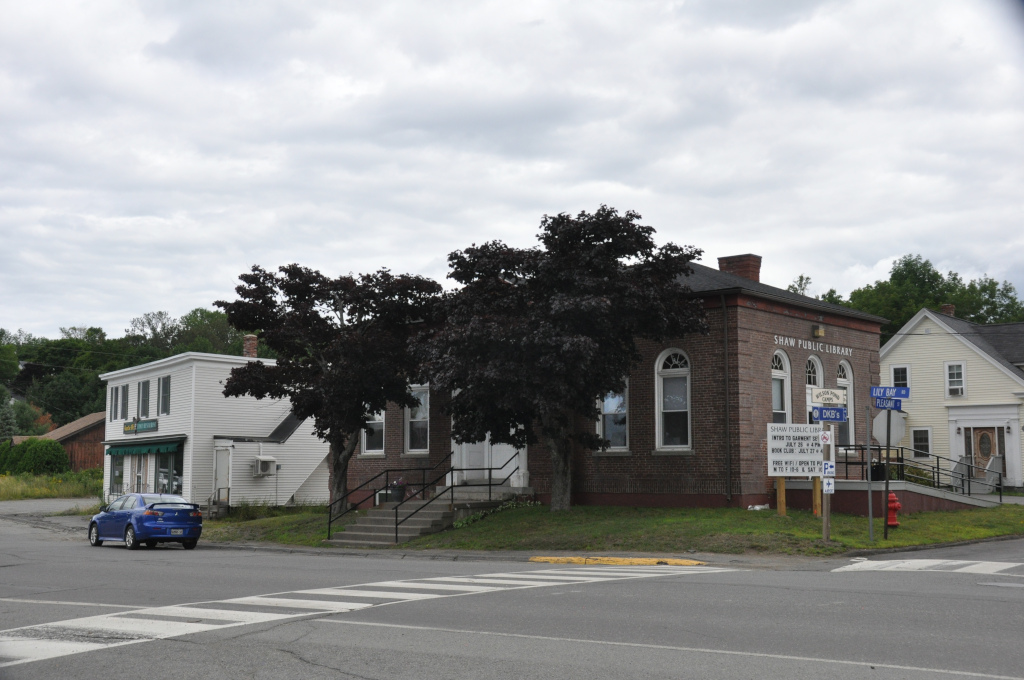
The Shaw Memorial Library in Greenville, built in 1925.

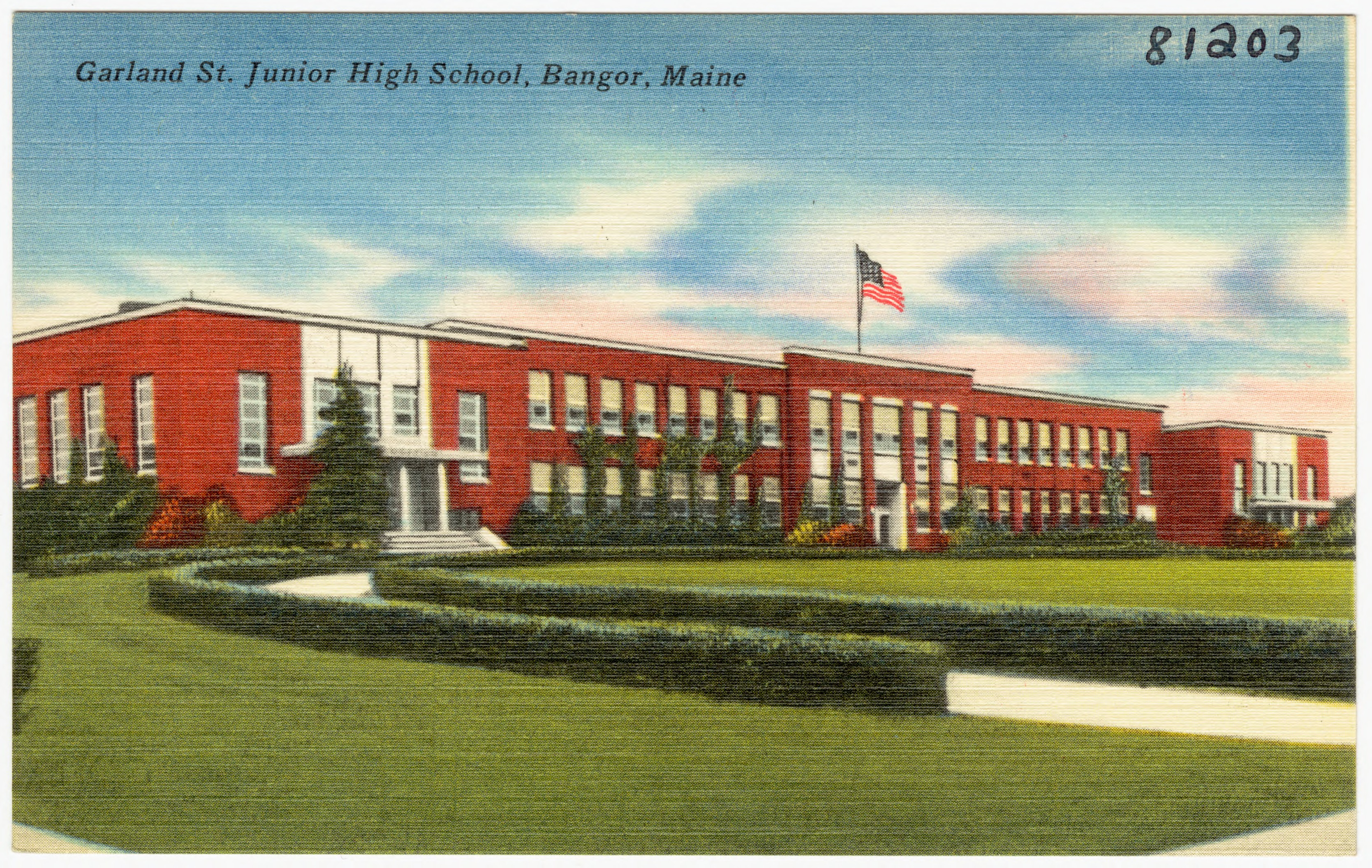
The William S. Cohen School in Bangor, completed in 1940.

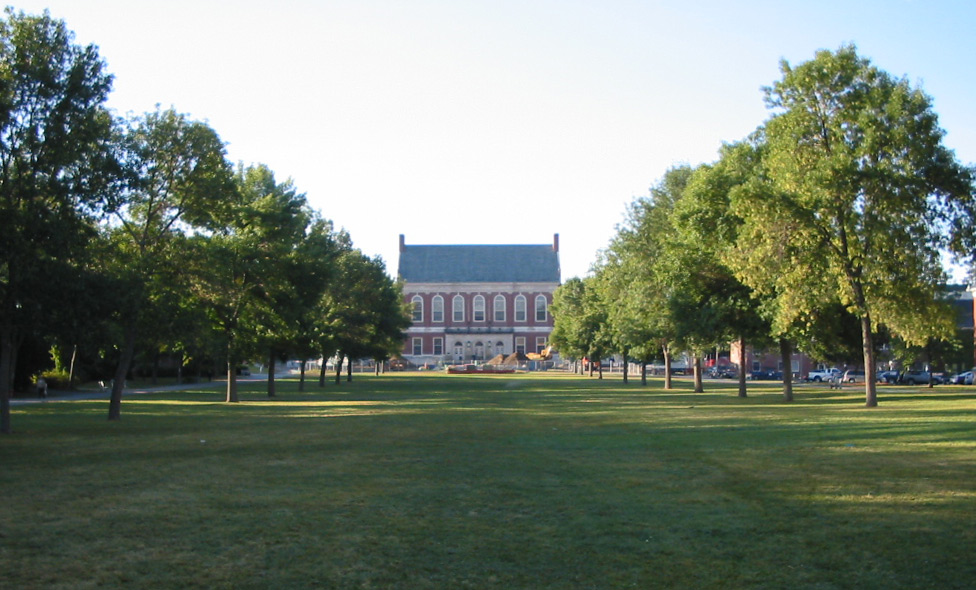
The Raymond H. Fogler Library of the University of Maine, designed by William Harold Lee of Philadelphia and Crowell & Lancaster and completed in 1947.

C. Parker Crowell FAIA (1876–1959) was an American architect in practice in Bangor, Maine, from 1902 until his retirement in 1956. Crowell and his firm would design over 1000 buildings in the course of his career. The firm Crowell co-founded is still in business as WBRC.

== Life and career ==
Charles Parker Crowell Jr. was born December 7, 1876, in Orono, Maine, to Charles Parker Crowell and Delia R. (Johnston) Crowell. He attended the University of Maine, graduating with a degree in mechanical engineering in 1898. After supplementary training in Boston, he returned to Bangor in 1902 to form the firm of Thomas & Crowell, architects and engineers, with his former classmate, John F. Thomas. Among their first works was Lord Hall, home to the engineering departments of the University of Maine. Crowell and his firm would be primary architects to the university for the rest of his career. Thomas returned to Boston in 1905, and Crowell continued the firm on his own. Like those of other local architects, Crowell's office was destroyed in the Great Fire of 1911. Nonetheless, the rebuilding also presented an unprecedented design opportunity. Crowell and his firm received a number of commissions in the burnt district, including the Eastern Trust Building in 1912.

In 1919 Crowell was joined in partnership by Walter S. Lancaster, a former employee, to form the firm of Crowell & Lancaster. In 1952 they merged their office with that of Ambrose S. Higgins of Portland, to form Crowell, Lancaster & Higgins. They were joined the same year by Gertrud E. Ebbeson, one of the first women to graduate from the architecture school of the Massachusetts Institute of Technology. In 1956 they expanded the partnership to include engineer Edwin P. Webster, formerly with Eaton W. Tarbell, in the renamed Crowell, Lancaster, Higgins & Webster, and shortly thereafter Crowell retired. Crowell retired as a highly respected architect, the dean of Maine architects.

Crowell joined the American Institute of Architects in 1931 as a member of the Boston chapter. In 1934 he was among the founders of the Maine chapter, and served a term as chapter vice president. In 1952 he was elected a Fellow, the organization's highest membership honor.

== Personal life ==
In 1901 Crowell was married to Mary Hutchinson, and they had two sons. Crowell died March 31, 1959, in Bangor.

Crowell was a member of the Bangor city council for the year 1908–09, of the school committee from 1911 to 1917 and chair of the committee that commissioned the Peirce Memorial in Peirce Park in 1925. In 1943–44 he served on the committee to prepare a building code for the city of Bangor and from 1948–52 was a member of the city planning board.

== Legacy ==
Crowell was the founder of an architectural firm which has survived to the present (2022). After Crowell's retirement, the office was led by Lancaster, Higgins and Webster in succession. Webster retired in 1987, and in 1989 the firm was renamed WBRC Architects Engineers, shortened simply to WBRC in 2022. Ebbeson, one of the first woman architects in Maine, was a partner in the firm from 1971 to 1978.

In 1961 Crowell's sons established a scholarship fund at the University of Maine in his honor.

At least two buildings designed by Crowell have been listed on the United States National Register of Historic Places, and others contribute to listed historic districts.

== Architectural works ==
- Maria Clark School (former), 85 Middle St, Hallowell, Maine (1902)
- Lord Hall, (Note: A contributing property to the University of Maine at Orono Historic District, listed on the National Register of Historic Places in 1978.) University of Maine, Orono, Maine (1903–04)
- Orono High School, 134 Main St, Orono, Maine (1903, demolished)
- Camden High School, Knowlton St, Camden, Maine (1904, demolished)
- Charles Nichols house, (Note: A contributing property to the Orono Main Street Historic District, listed on the National Register of Historic Places in 1977.) 66 Main St, Orono, Maine (1905)
- George E. Thompson house, (Note: A contributing property to the Whitney Park Historic District, listed on the National Register of Historic Places in 1988.) 28 W Broadway, Bangor, Maine (1909)
- Kirstein Block, (Note: A contributing property to the Great Fire of 1911 Historic District, listed on the National Register of Historic Places in 1984.) 44 Central St, Bangor, Maine (1911)
- Eastern Trust Building, 6 State St, Bangor, Maine (1912)
- Balentine Hall, University of Maine, Orono, Maine (1914)
- Gallison Memorial Library, 1292 Main St, Harrington, Maine (1922–23, NRHP 2001)
- Stevens Hall, University of Maine, Orono, Maine (1923 and 1930)
- Phi Gamma Delta House, 79 College Ave, Orono, Maine (1925, NRHP 2013)
- Shaw Public Library, 9 Lily Bay Rd, Greenville, Maine (1925)
- Rogers Hall, University of Maine, Orono, Maine (1928)
- Colvin Hall, University of Maine, Orono, Maine (1930)
- Merrill Hall, University of Maine, Orono, Maine (1931)
- Oak Hall, University of Maine, Orono, Maine (1937)
- Lyndon Oak Memorial Library, 20 Corinth Rd, Garland, Maine (1937)
- Orono High School (former), 14 Goodridge Dr, Orono, Maine (1938)
- William S. Cohen School, 304 Garland St, Bangor, Maine (1940)
- James F. Doughty School, 143 5th St, Bangor, Maine (1940)
- Estabrook Hall, University of Maine, Orono, Maine (1940)
- Raymond H. Fogler Library, (Note: As associate architect.) University of Maine, Orono, Maine (1941–47)
- Chatbourne Hall, University of Maine, Orono, Maine (1947)
- Corbett Hall, University of Maine, Orono, Maine (1947)
- Dunn Hall, University of Maine, Orono, Maine (1947)
- Boardman Hall, University of Maine, Orono, Maine (1949)
- Deering Hall, University of Maine, Orono, Maine (1949)
- Bangor Daily News Building, 491 Main St, Bangor, Maine (1955)
- Millinocket Regional Hospital, 200 Somerset St, Millinocket, Maine (1955)
