= Charles Stetson =

Maine politician

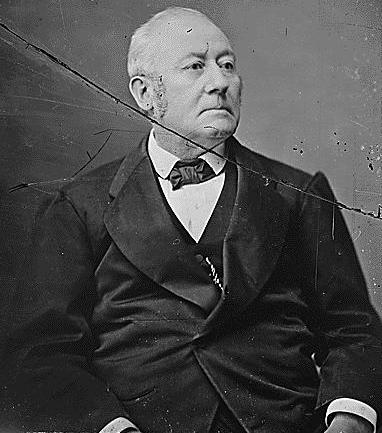
- A United States Representative from Maine

Member of the U.S. House of Representatives from Maine's 6th district
- In office March 4, 1849 – March 3, 1851
- Preceded by: James S. Wiley
- Succeeded by: Israel Washburn Jr.

Personal details
- Born: November 2, 1801 New Ipswich, New Hampshire
- Died: March 27, 1883 (aged 81) Bangor, Maine
- Resting place: Mount Hope Cemetery
- Party: Democratic
- Spouse: Emily J. Pierce
- Education: Hampden Academy, Yale College

Charles Stetson (November 2, 1801 – March 27, 1883) was a United States representative from Maine, and the eldest member of a powerful Bangor political family. He was born in New Ipswich, New Hampshire, on November 2, 1801, but moved with his parents to Hampden, Maine, in 1802. His father Simeon Stetson (b. Braintree, Massachusetts) kept a store and a sawmill, and built vessels for the West India Trade. His uncle Amasa Stetson was proprietor of the nearby town of Stetson, Maine, where Simeon had briefly settled before moving to Hampden.

Stetson was 13 years old when a British invasion force sacked the town of Hampden and terrorized its inhabitants following the Battle of Hampden (1814). He subsequently attended Hampden Academy and graduated from Yale College in 1823. He studied law, was admitted to the bar and commenced practice in Hampden in 1826.

== Legal and political career ==
Stetson was admitted to the bar of the United States Supreme Court in 1828, then held various local offices. He moved to Bangor, adjoining Hampden, in 1833, as that city grew rapidly into the region's largest port. He was appointed Judge of the Bangor Municipal Court (1834–1839), Member of the Common Council of Bangor (1843–1844), and a Member of the Executive Council of Maine (1845–1848). Stetson was finally elected as a Democrat to the Thirty-first United States Congress (March 4, 1849 – March 3, 1851).

Stetson was an unsuccessful candidate for renomination to the Thirty-second Congress, and resumed the practice of law in Bangor. He affiliated with the Republican Party in 1860, as had most local politicians, including fellow Hampdenite Hannibal Hamlin, who became Lincoln's Vice President. Stetson died in Bangor March 27, 1883, and was interred in Mount Hope Cemetery in Bangor.

== Stetson Family ==
Stetson was married to Emily Jane Pierce, the daughter of Waldo Pierce of Frankfort, Maine.

The Stetsons became a powerful Bangor mercantile and political family in Charles' lifetime and beyond. Stetson's younger brother, Isaiah Stetson (1812–1880), served as Mayor of Bangor (1859–1862), and Member the Maine House of Representatives (1866–67). His other brother George Stetson (1807–1891) became a leading Bangor lumber merchant, shipbuilder, bank & insurance company president, and civic figure, and married the niece of future Vice President Hannibal Hamlin. George also served in the Maine House of Representatives (1863–64). George's son Isaiah Kidder Stetson (b. 1858, Yale class of 1879) expanded his father's business interests into ice harvesting, and became Speaker of the Maine House of Representatives (1899–1900) and a member of the Maine State Senate (1903–1906).

Charles' daughter Caroline Pierce Stetson married attorney Franklin A. Wilson, who also represented Bangor in the Maine House of Representatives (1874–75) and subsequently became President of the Maine Central Railroad. His son (Charles Stetson's grandson and namesake) Charles Stetson Wilson became U.S. Ambassador to (respectively) Bulgaria, Romania, and Yugoslavia in the 1920s and early 1930s.

There are two Stetson Blocks in downtown Bangor. The Stetson Block on Exchange Street was burned in the Great Fire of 1911 and quickly replaced by a building of the same name, and in the same location, from a design by local architect Wilfred E. Mansur. A second and larger Stetson Block was built in 1913 on Central Street, from a design by Parker, Thomas, and Rice of Boston. It presently houses "Bagel Central". Both buildings are currently protected as part of the Great Fire of 1911 National Register Historic District. The lower part of Broadway is also known as "Stetson Square".

The George Stetson House at 208 French St. in Bangor is listed on the National Register of Historic Places as part of the Broadway Historic District. This Greek Revival style house was designed by local architect-builder Benjamin S. Deane in 1847-48.

U.S. House of Representatives
Preceded by James S. Wiley	Member of the U.S. House of Representatives from Maine's 6th congressional district March 4, 1849 – March 3, 1851	Succeeded by Israel Washburn Jr.
