= Nichols Block =

Building in Bangor, Maine

The Nichols Block (1892) is a prominent Romanesque Revival style commercial building in downtown Bangor, Maine. Designed by local architect Wilfred E. Mansur, it is listed on the National Register of Historic Places as part of the Great Fire of 1911 Historic District. The building is one of few in the Exchange St. district of Bangor to have escaped both the Great Fire of 1911 and the so-called urban renewal programme of the late 1960s.

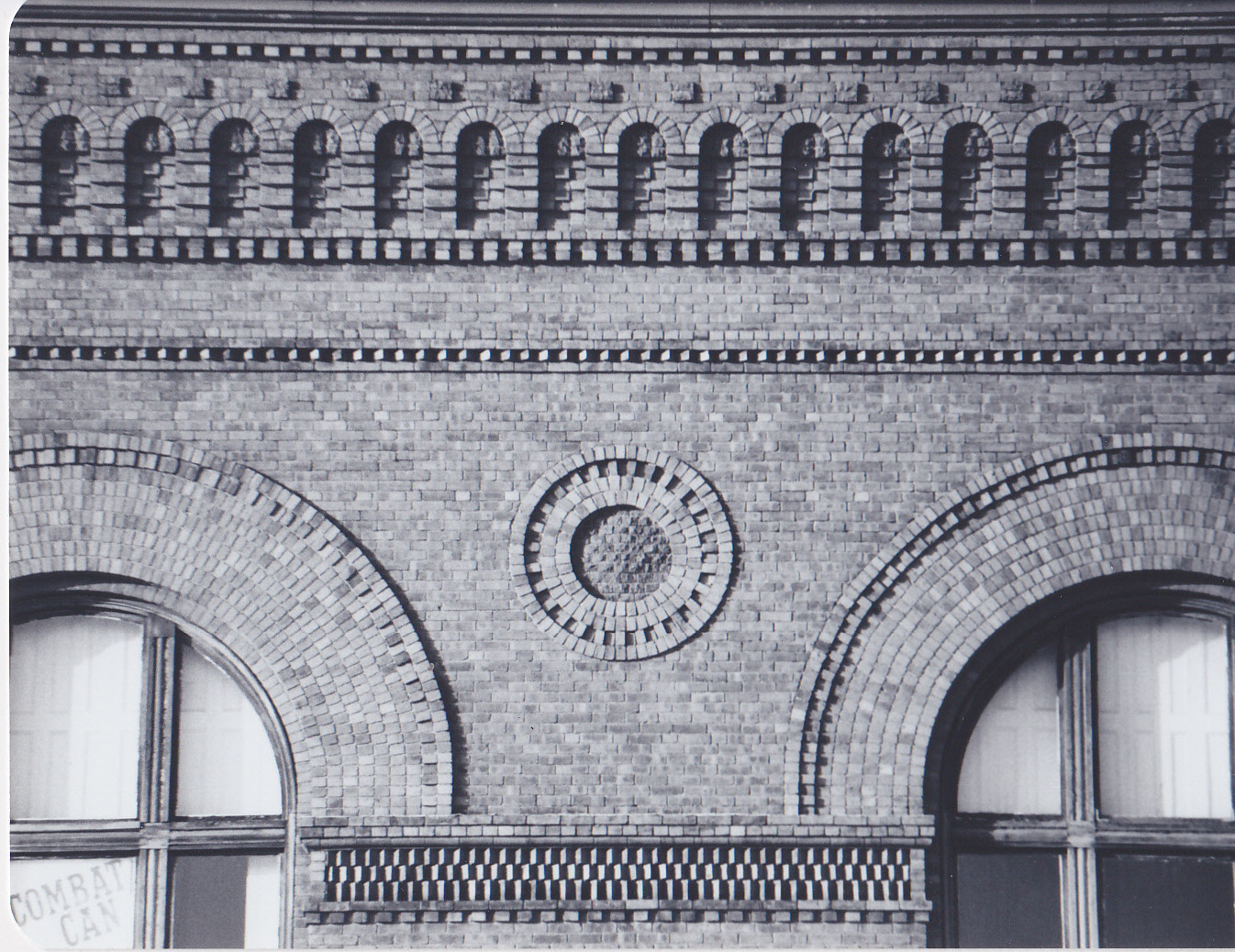
Nichols Block (1892) Wilfred Mansur, architect

The building was commissioned by Eugene C. Nichols (better known as E.C. Nichols) who owned one of the largest dry & fancy goods stores in 19th century Bangor. The E.C. Nichols Co. store was on Main Street, across the Kenduskeag Stream from the site of the 1892 Nichols Block. Nichols' new building was apparently an investment, and was initially occupied by Meyer M. Levy's Bangor Clothing Store and, on the upper stories, a "Social Hall" rented for functions. The opening function was a dance, just before Christmas in 1892, hosted by Miss June Nichols, the owner's daughter. Exchange St. was at that time a center of social life in Bangor, with numerous hotels and bars. The central train station was at the end of the street.

Wilfred E. Mansur was Bangor's most prominent turn-of-the-century architect. In 1895 he also designed E.C. Nichol's house, a wooden mansion with a prominent round tower, still standing on Union St. at the corner with High St.
