= Great Fire of 1911 Historic District =

Historic district in Maine, United States

- U.S. National Register of Historic Places
- U.S. Historic district
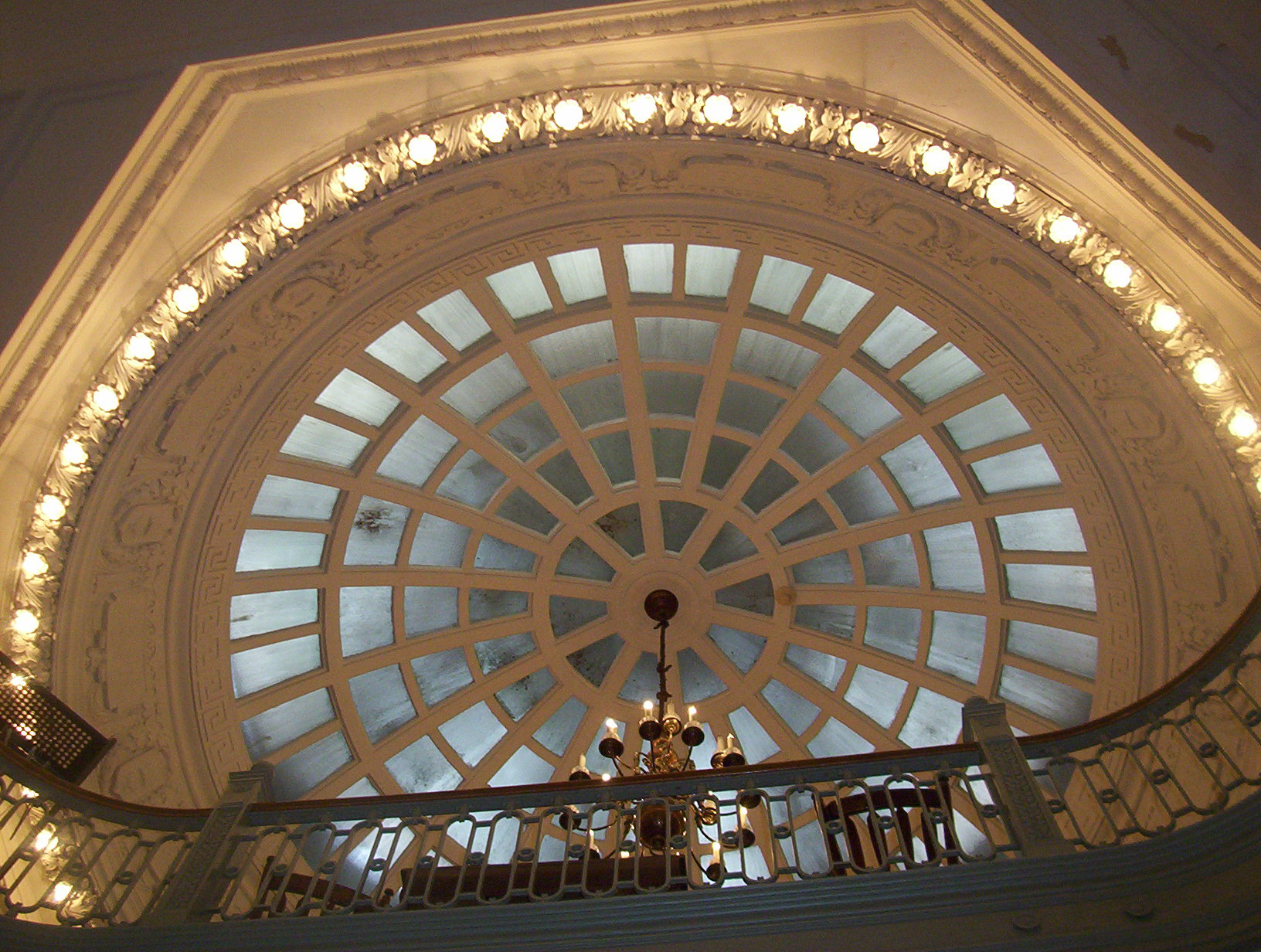
- Bangor Public Library Dome

- Location within Maine Location within the United States
- Location: Harlow, Center, Park, State, York, and Central Streets; Bangor, Maine
- Coordinates: 44.803°N 68.770°W
- Area: 24 acres (9.7 ha)
- Built: 1911
- Architect: multiple
- Architectural style: Late 19th And Early 20th Century American Movements, Renaissance
- NRHP reference No.: 84001479 (original); 100008538 (increase)

Significant dates
- Added to NRHP: June 14, 1984
- Boundary increase: January 4, 2023

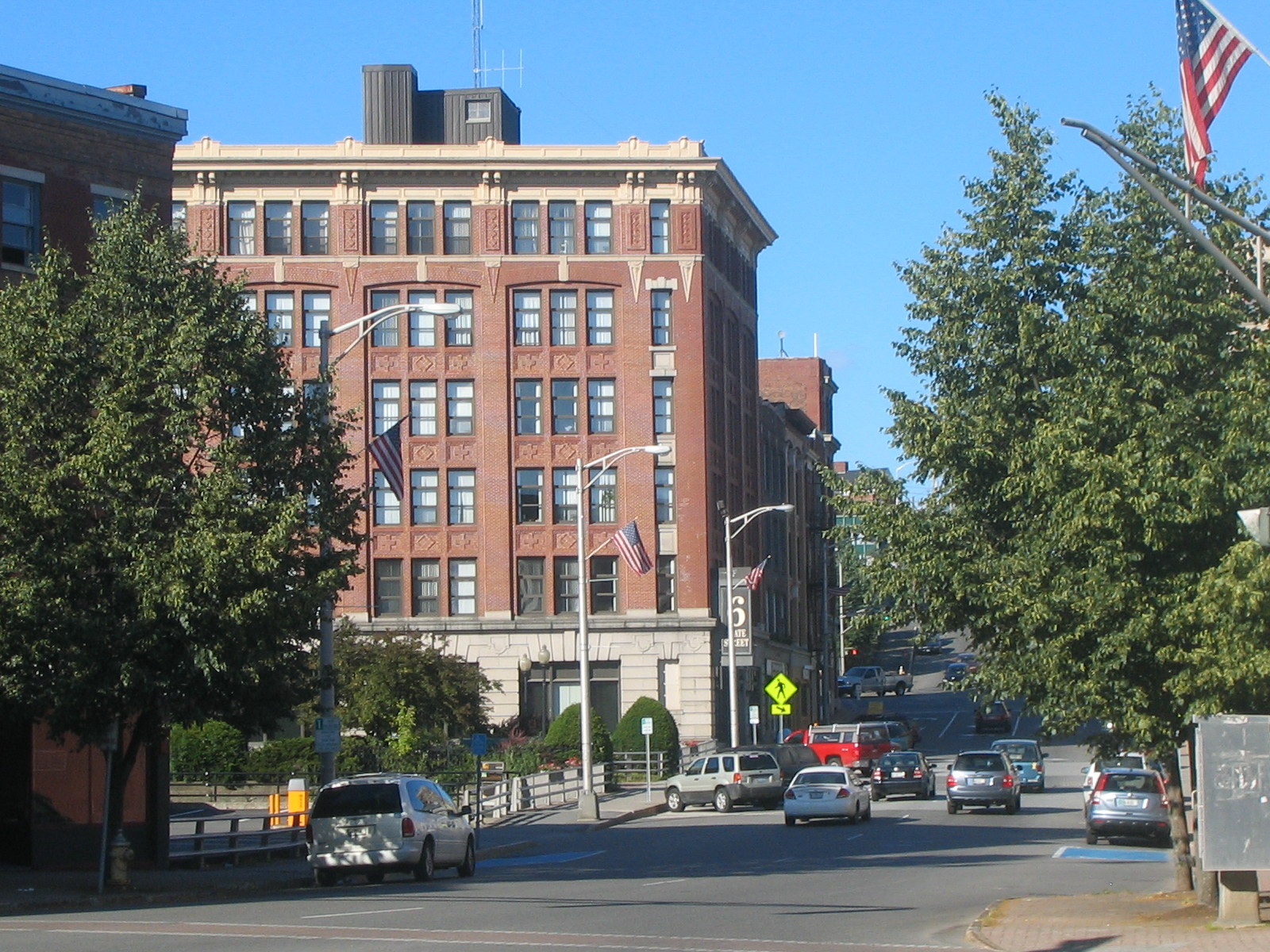
Eastern Trust Building (1912) in Great Fire of 1911 Historic District

The Great Fire of 1911 Historic District is located in downtown Bangor, Maine, and has been listed on the National Register of Historic Places since 1984. It preserves Maine's most significant collection of early 20th century public and commercial buildings, and commemorates an urban re-building campaign matched only by Portland's following its own destruction by fire in 1866. The Great Fire of 1911 was Maine's (and one of the nation's) last large-scale urban conflagrations, but resulted in the creation of an early 20th-century urban space relatively unique in Maine or northern New England.

The district comprises 48 buildings (and three parks), most of them constructed between 1911 and 1915 in the burned area, which accounted for half of Bangor's commercial core. Stylistically, the rebuilding was mainly a showcase for the Renaissance Revival, but with elements of the Romanesque Revival, Chicago School, Prairie Style, Art Deco, Classical Revival, and Colonial Revival. The designs were contributed by a number of nationally prominent architectural firms, including Peabody and Stearns; Carrere and Hastings; and Jardine, Kent & Hill; as well as U.S. government architect Oscar Wenderoth, and local architects C. Parker Crowell, Wilfred E. Mansur, Victor Hodgins, and Frederick A. Patterson. Every building except one is of brick, though some are steel-framed, two are faced with terra-cotta, and two are completely sheathed in granite. The coloration and patterning of the brickwork is extremely varied.

Architecturally significant buildings within the Great Fire District include the:

- Bangor Public Library, 1912, Peabody and Stearns
- Bangor High School (now apartments), 1912, Peabody and Stearns
- Morse Building (now University of Maine art gallery), 1914–1915, Victor Hodgins
- First National Bank - Bangor Hydro Electric Building, 1915, Wilfred E. Mansur
- Exchange Building, 1913, Peabody and Stearns
- Bangor Savings Bank Building, 1912, Carrere and Hastings
- Eastern Trust Building, 1912, C. Parker Crowell
- Graham Building, 1911, Wilfred E. Mansur. One of the first and largest buildings constructed, commissioned by John R. Graham, President of the Bangor Hydro Electric Company, and a prime mover in the rebuilding.
- Stearns Block, 1911, Wilfred E. Mansur
- Stetson Block, 1911, Wilfred E. Mansur
- Bangor Post Office (now City Hall), 1914–1915, Oscar Wenderoth

Three of the district's architecturally-significant buildings were constructed somewhat later, in the 1920s and 1930s, most prominently the Bangor Telephone Exchange (1931), designed in Art Deco style in 1931 by the Boston architectural firm of Densmore, LeClear, and Robbins, and the most prominent example of that style in Maine. A few other important buildings within the district actually pre-date the fire, including the Tarratine Club (1907) by Parker, Thomas, and Rice of Boston, and the Nichols Block (1892) by Wilfred Mansur of Bangor.

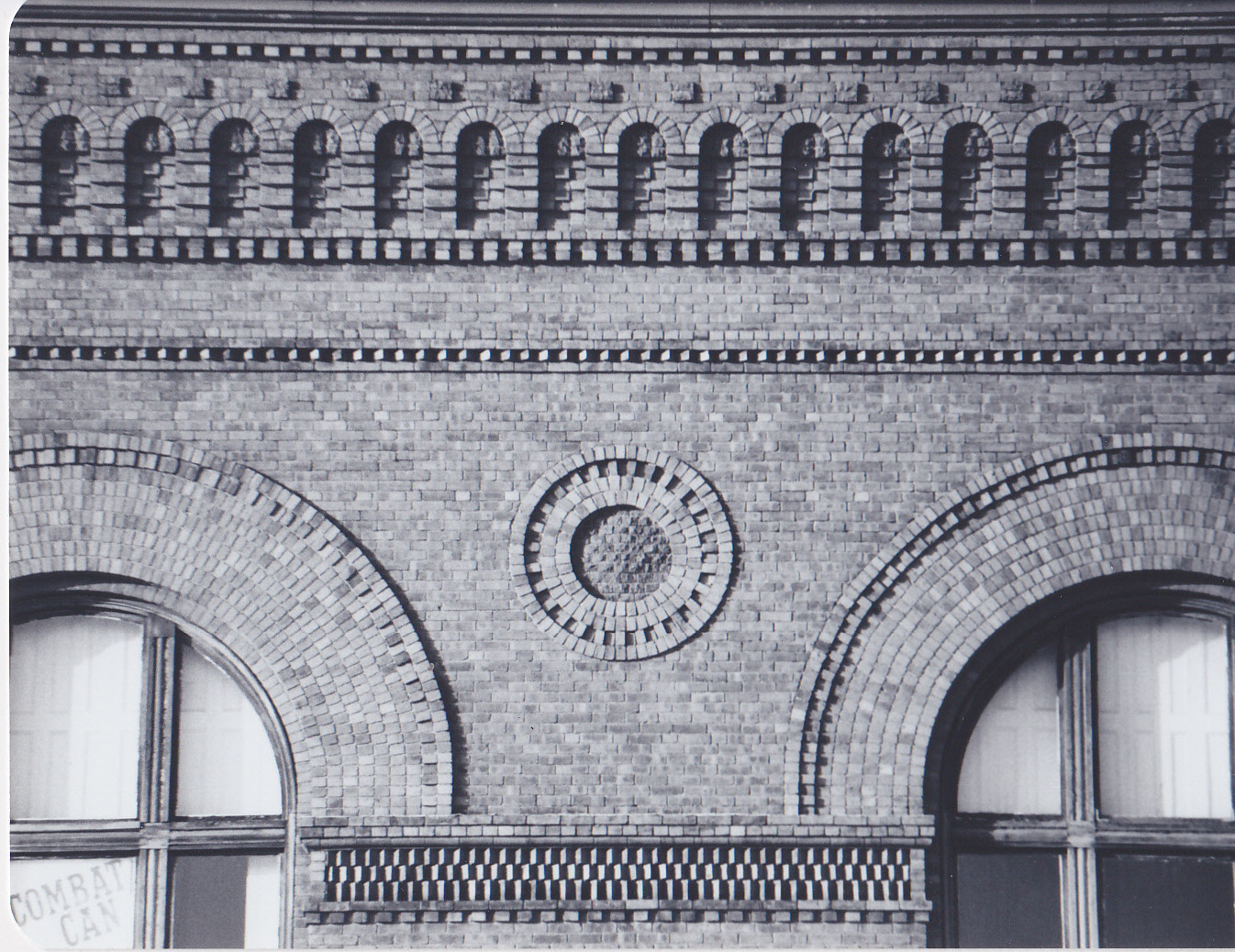
Nichols Block (1892) Wilfred Mansur, architect

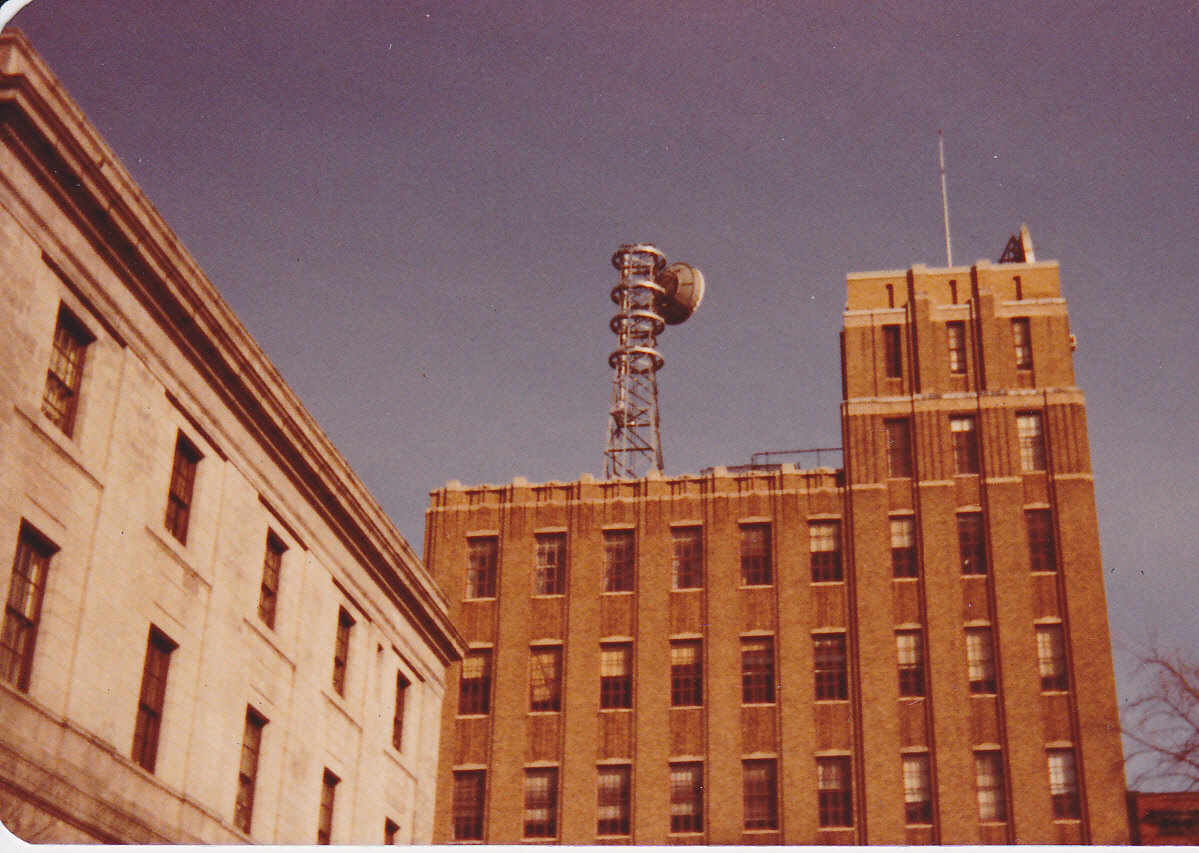
Telephone Exchange (1931), Densmore & LeClear, architects

The district also includes three parks:

- Norumbega Mall (laid out 1933, on site of the burned Norumbega Hall
- Kenduskeag Mall (1912), Warren H. Manning, which includes a bronze statue of Hannibal Hamlin
- Pierce Park (1912), which includes a bronze statue of river drivers

== See also ==
- National Register of Historic Places listings in Penobscot County, Maine
