= Wilfred E. Mansur =

American architect

Wilfred E. Mansur (1855–1921) was the most prominent architect in late 19th- and early 20th-century Bangor, Maine.

== Life and career ==
Mansur designed many private and municipal buildings, including the Penobscot County Courthouse and at least seven schools. His masterpieces are probably the Nichols Block and Columbia Building (both 1892), in which he used a Romanesque Revival style with exuberant patterned brickwork, and the Graham Building of 1911, among the most prominent landmarks in downtown Bangor. Mansur's largest number of commissions came following the Great Fire of 1911, which destroyed half of the city's commercial district (and a number of his own buildings). At least eleven designed buildings he designed are preserved on the National Register of Historic Places, many in Bangor's Great Fire of 1911 Historic District.

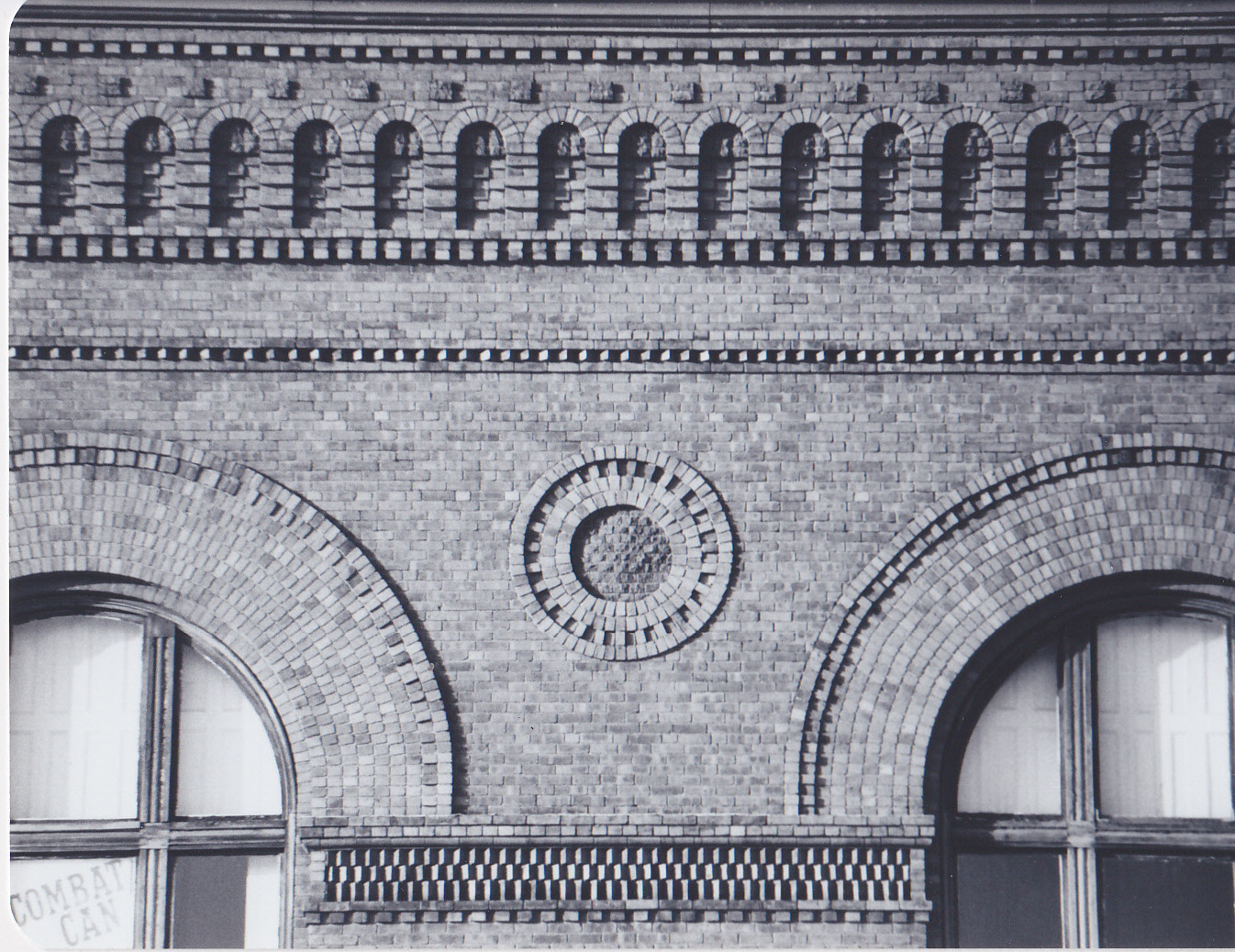
Nichols Block (1892), Bangor, Maine

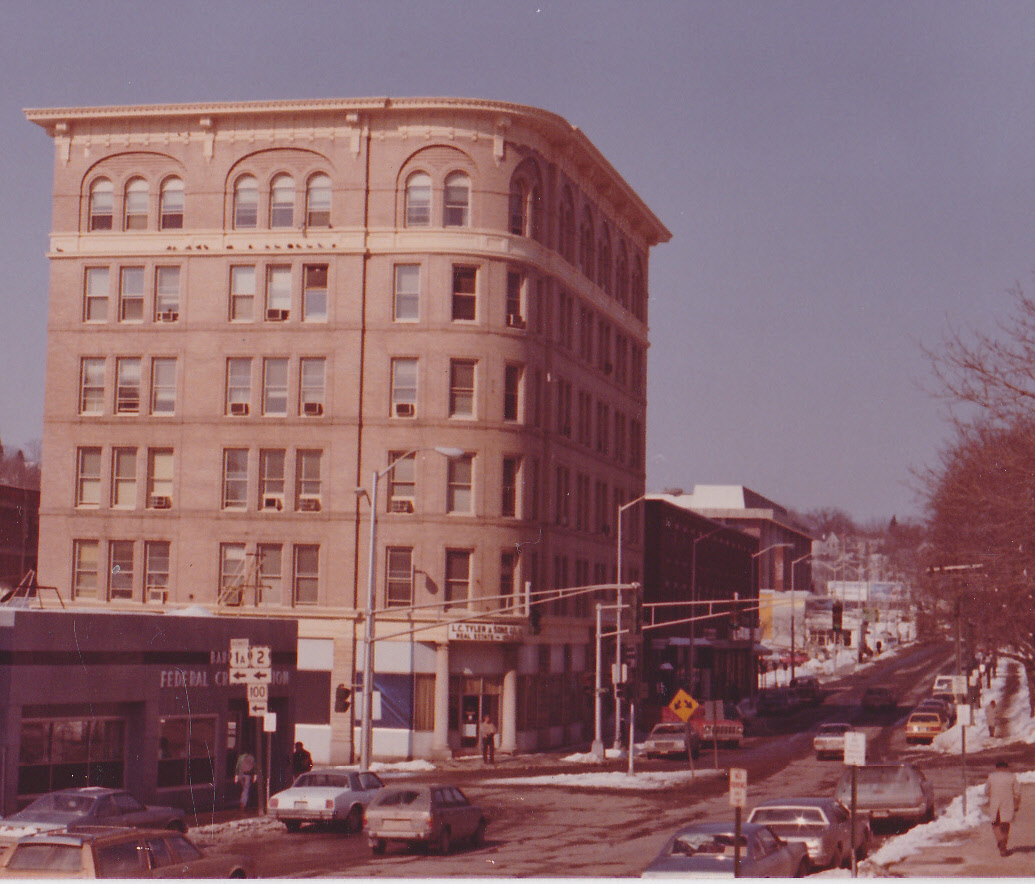
Graham Building (1911), Bangor, Maine

== Personal life ==
Mansur's brother George I. Mansur was also an architect. After working in his brother's office for many years, George I. Mansur succeeded to the practice after his death.

Mansur was a member of the American Institute of Architects, the Boston Society of Architects, and the Maine Society of Architects. He was also a prominent Mason.

Mansur married in 1892, to Charlotte Elizabeth Brown of Bangor.

== Architectural works ==
- Bangor High School, Bangor, Maine (1882, burned 1911)
- Green Mountain House, Acadia National Park, Maine (1883, burned 1884)
- Green Mountain House, Acadia National Park, Maine (1885, demolished 1896)
- Hersey Retreat, Stockton Springs, Maine (1885, burned 1908)
- Howes Block, (Note: A contributing property to the Belfast Commercial Historic District, listed on the National Register of Historic Places in 1980.) Belfast, Maine (1885)
- I. O. O. F. Building, Old Town, Maine (1887)
- Brewer High School (former), Brewer, Maine (1888, demolished)
- I. O. O. F. Building, Belfast, Maine (1888)
- Aroostook County Jail, Houlton, Maine (1889–90, NRHP 1990)
- First Congregational Church, Brewer, Maine (1889)
- Moosehead Inn, Greenville, Maine (1889, burned 1912)
- House for Frederic H. Parkhurst, (Note: A contributing property to the Whitney Park Historic District, listed on the National Register of Historic Places in 1988.) Bangor, Maine (1890)
- Y. M. C. A. Building, Bangor, Maine (1890–91, demolished)
- Orono Town Hall, Orono, Maine (1891–92, demolished)
- Columbia Building, (Note: Now known as the Heritage Building.) Bangor, Maine (1892–93)
- House for Frederic H. Appleton, Bangor, Maine (1892–93)
- House for Francis B. Denio, (Note: A contributing property to the Bangor Theological Seminary Historic District, listed on the National Register of Historic Places in 1977.) Bangor, Maine (1892–93)
- Nichols Block, (Note: A contributing property to the Great Fire of 1911 Historic District, listed on the National Register of Historic Places in 1984.) Bangor, Maine (1892)
- Superintendent's house, Bangor Waterworks, Bangor, Maine (1892, demolished 2017)
- Shaw Block, Greenville, Maine (1893)
- Frisbie Block, (Note: A contributing property to the Market Square Historic District, listed on the National Register of Historic Places in 1980.) Houlton, Maine (1894–95 and 1905)
- Aroostook County Courthouse, Caribou, Maine (1895)
- Addition to the Aroostook County Courthouse, Houlton, Maine (1895, NRHP 1990)
- Gymnasium, Bangor Theological Seminary (former), Bangor, Maine (1895)
- House for John N. Merrill, Bangor, Maine (1895–96)
- House for Eugene C. Nichols, Bangor, Maine
- Morse & Company Office Building, Bangor, Maine (1895, NRHP 1973)
- Palm Street School, Bangor, Maine (1895, demolished)
- Bangor Hose House No. 5 (former), (Note: Now the Hose 5 Fire Museum.) Bangor, Maine (1897, NRHP 1997)
- Moody Memorial Chapel, (Note: A contributing property to the Hinckley Good Will Home Historic District, listed on the National Register of Historic Places in 1987.) Good Will-Hinckley, Fairfield, Maine (1897)
- Niben Club, Pushaw Lake, Orono, Maine (1897, demolished)
- Surgical Building, Eastern Maine Medical Center, Bangor, Maine (1898–99)
- Eastport Primary School (former), Eastport, Maine (1899)
- Morse-Oliver Building, Bangor, Maine (1899, burned 1911)
- Lodge, Mount Hope Cemetery, Bangor, Maine (1900, NRHP 1974)
- Bangor Fire Engine House No. 6 (former), Bangor, Maine (1902, NRHP 1988)
- Penobscot County Courthouse, Bangor, Maine (1902–05)
- Addition to house for William M. Shaw, Greenville, Maine (1905, NRHP 2013)
- Mansur Block, Houlton, Maine (1905–06)
- Larkin Street School (former), Bangor, Maine (1906–07)
- M. G. Shaw Lumber Company Office, Greenville, Maine (1906, demolished)
- Houlton Town Office, Houlton, Maine (1907)
- Hersey Retreat, Stockton Springs, Maine (1909)
- Graham Building, Bangor, Maine (1911)
- Central Building, Bangor, Maine (1912)
- First National Bank Building, Bangor, Maine (1915)
- Peirce School (former), (Note: A contributing property to the Church Street Historic District, listed on the National Register of Historic Places in 1978. Now a private residence.) Belfast, Maine (1915)
- Preble Hall, University of Maine at Presque Isle, Presque Isle, Maine (1920–21)

== Gallery of architectural works ==
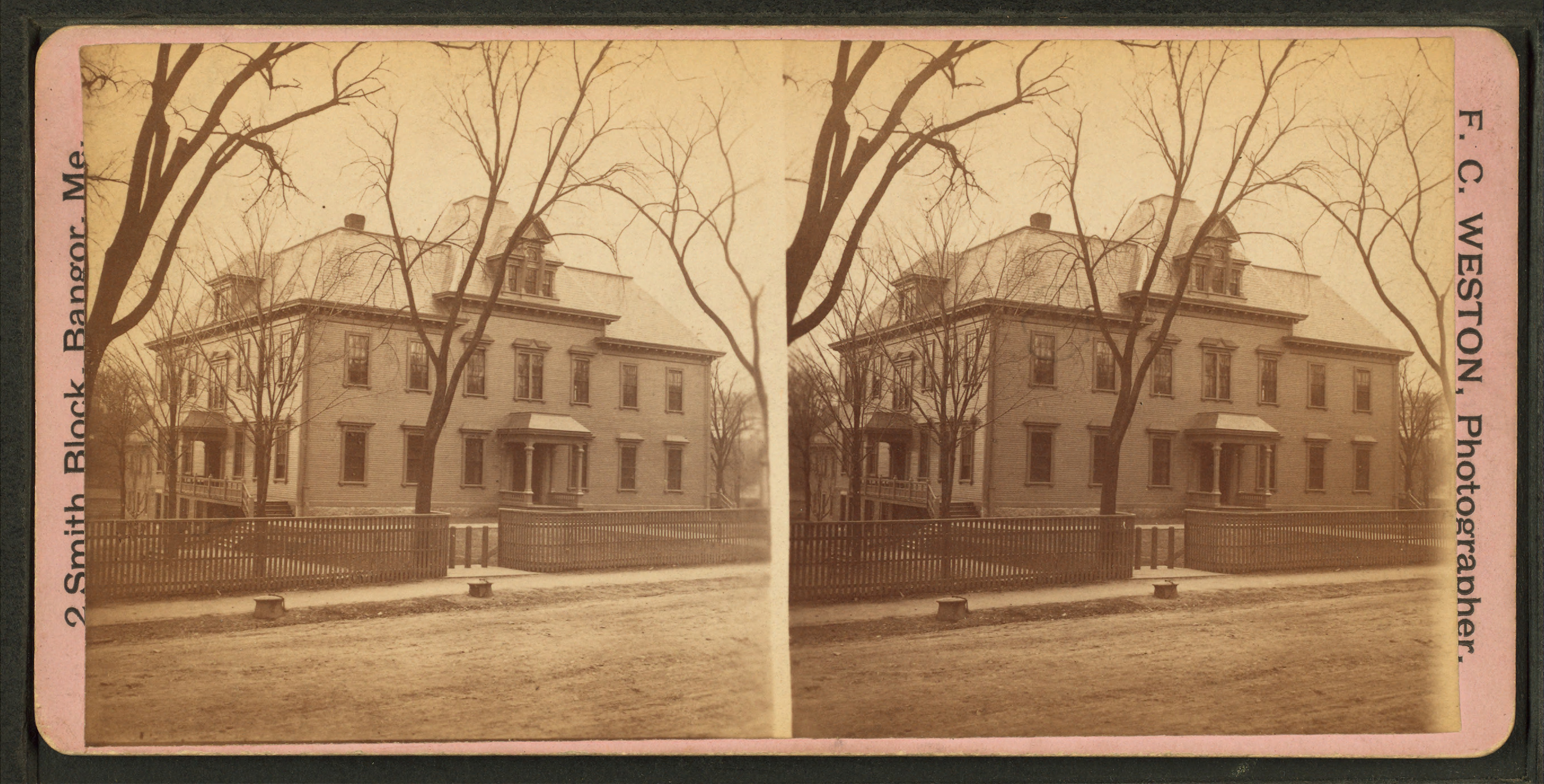
Bangor High School, Bangor, Maine, 1882

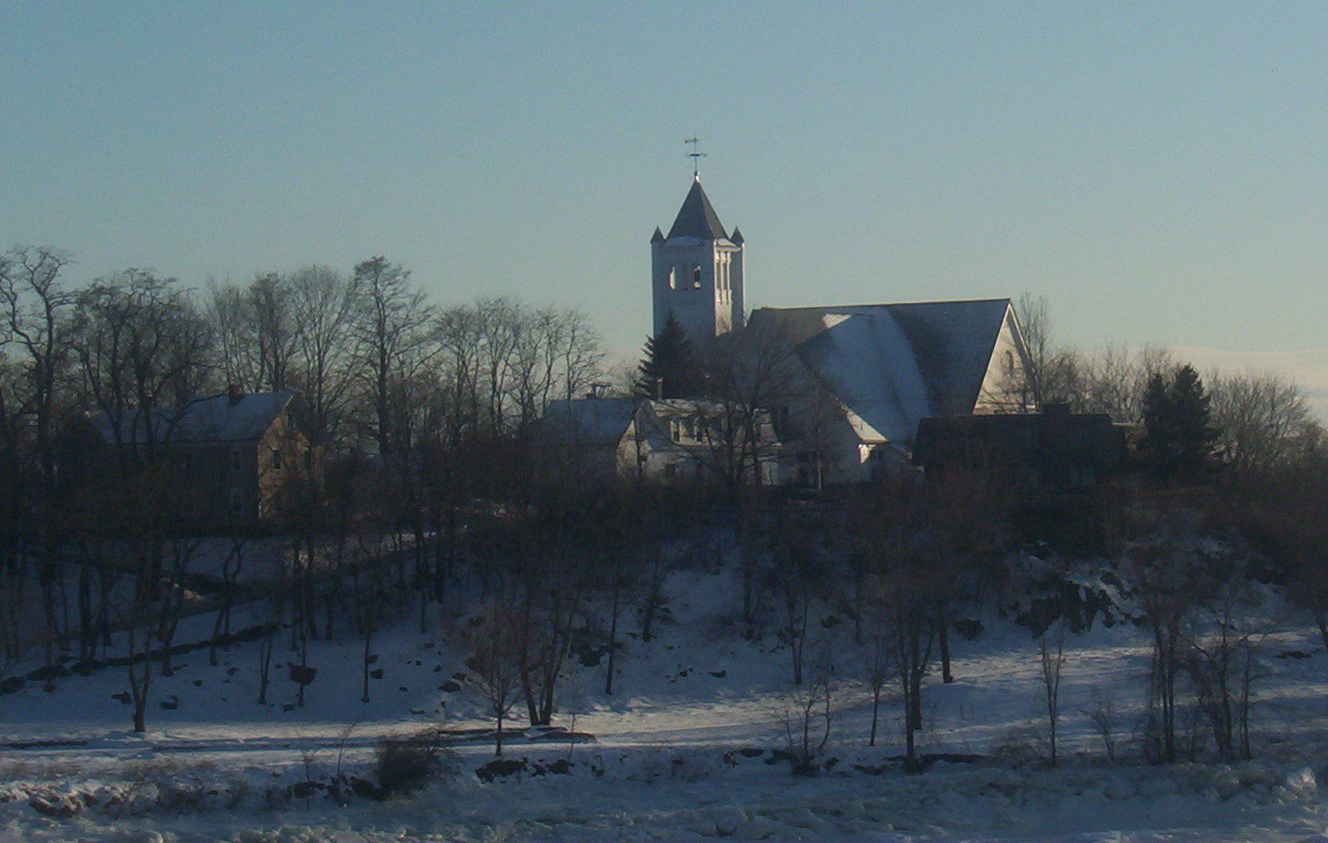
First Congregational Church, Brewer, Maine, 1889

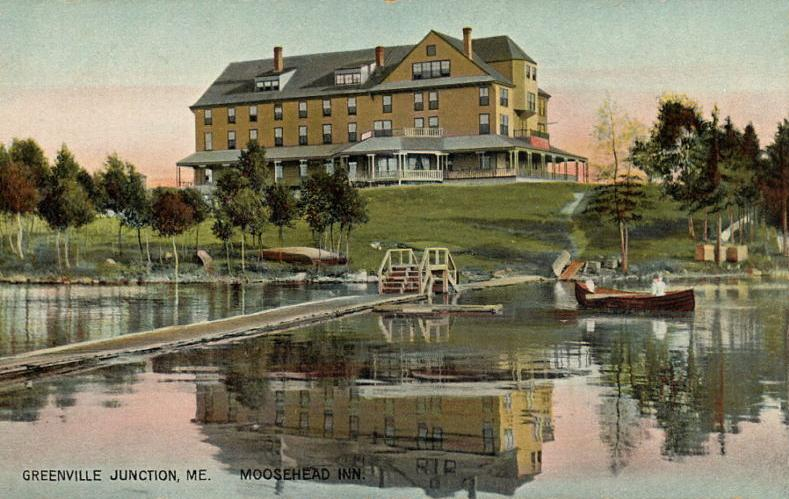
Moosehead Inn, Greenville, Maine, 1889

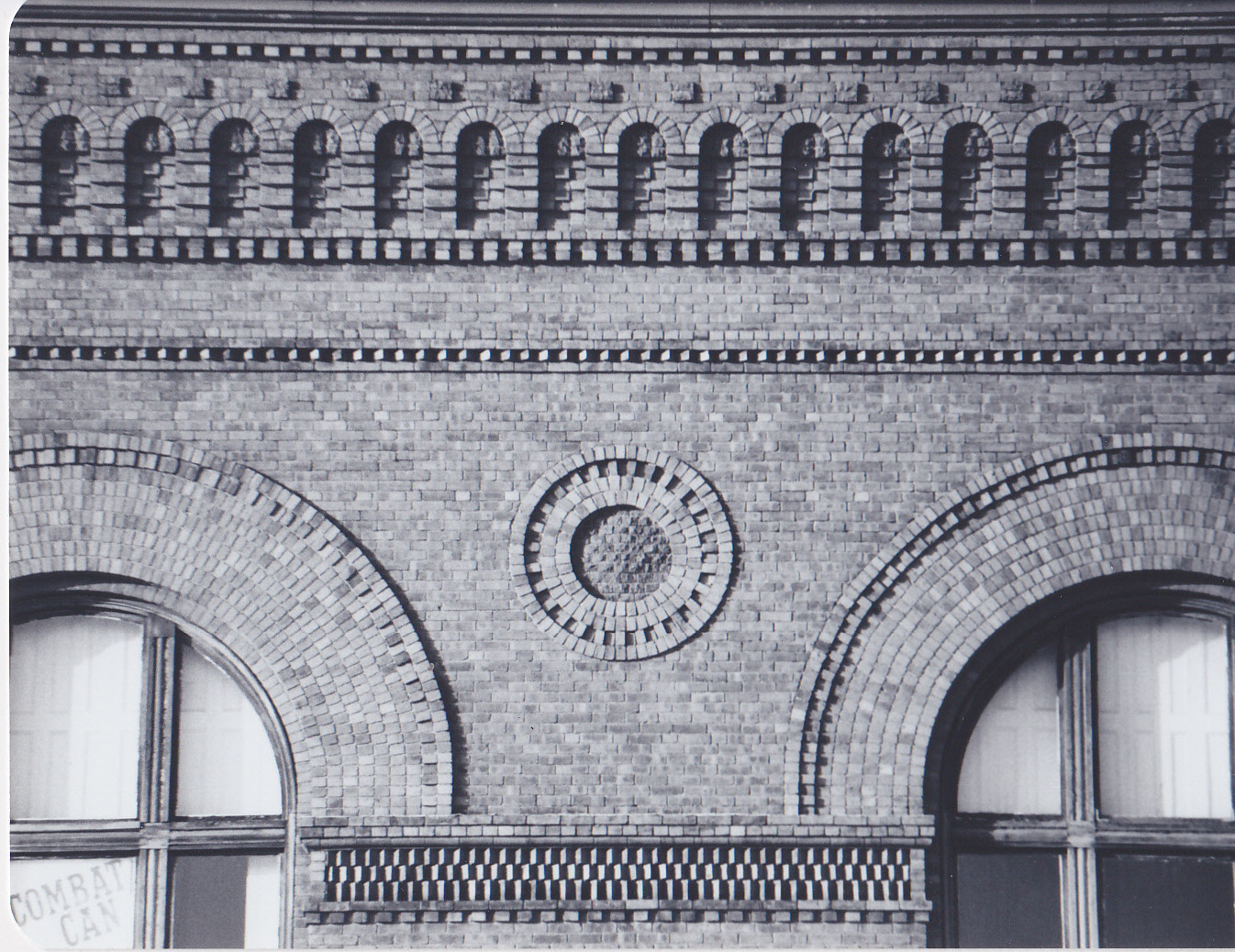
Detail of the Nichols Block, Bangor, Maine, 1892

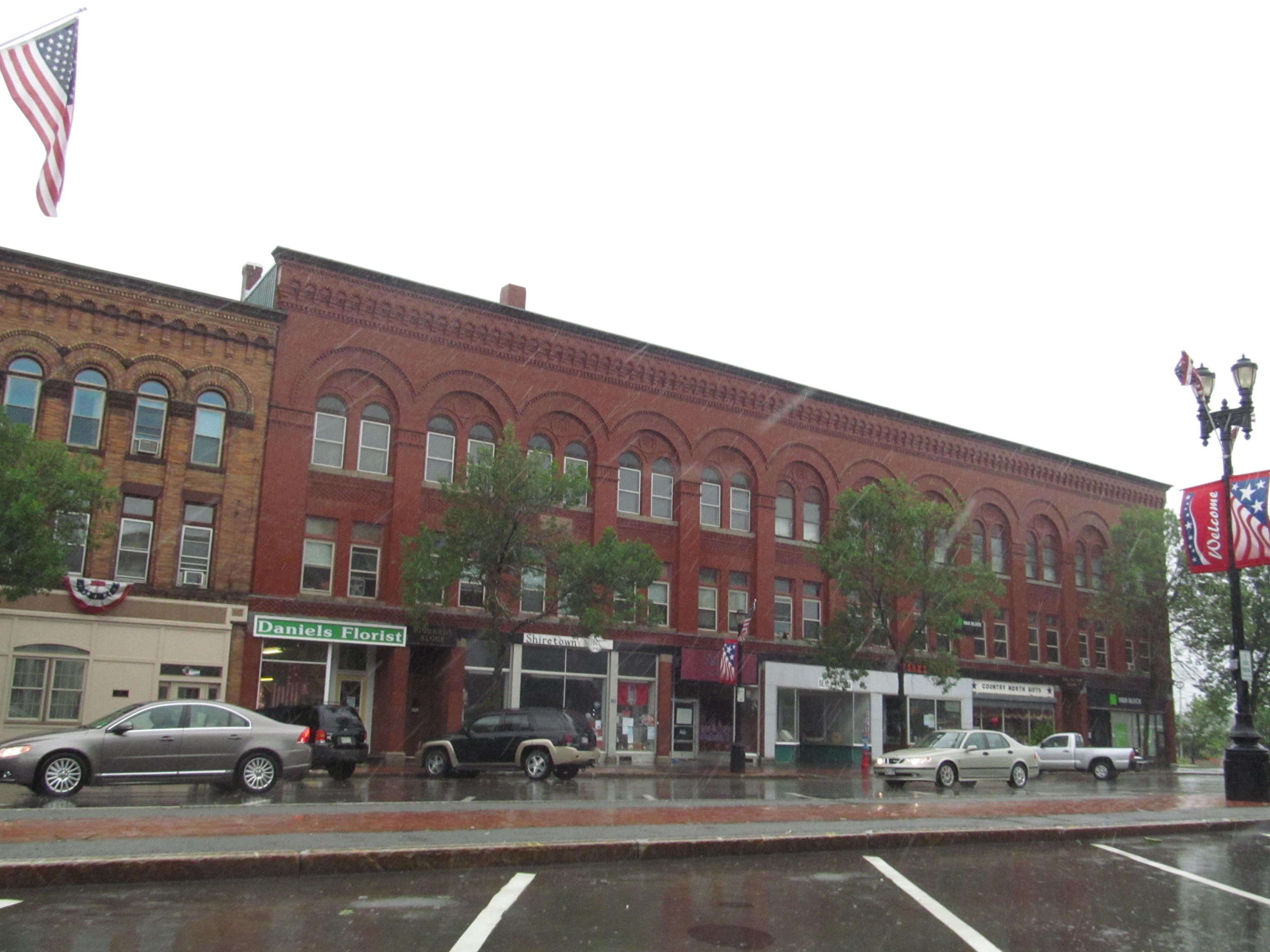
Frisbie Block, Houlton, Maine, 1894–95 and 1905

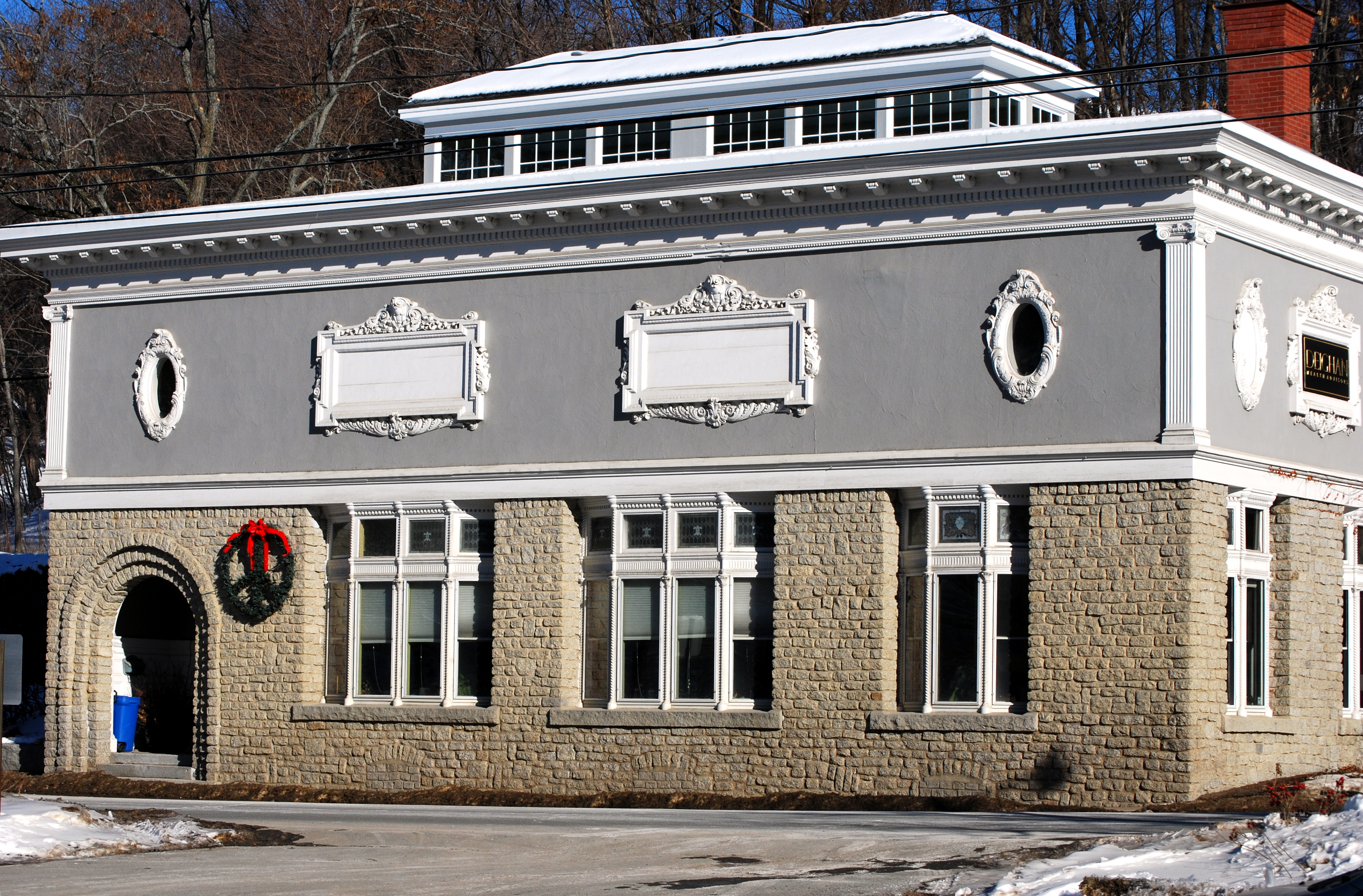
Morse & Company Office Building, Bangor, Maine, 1895

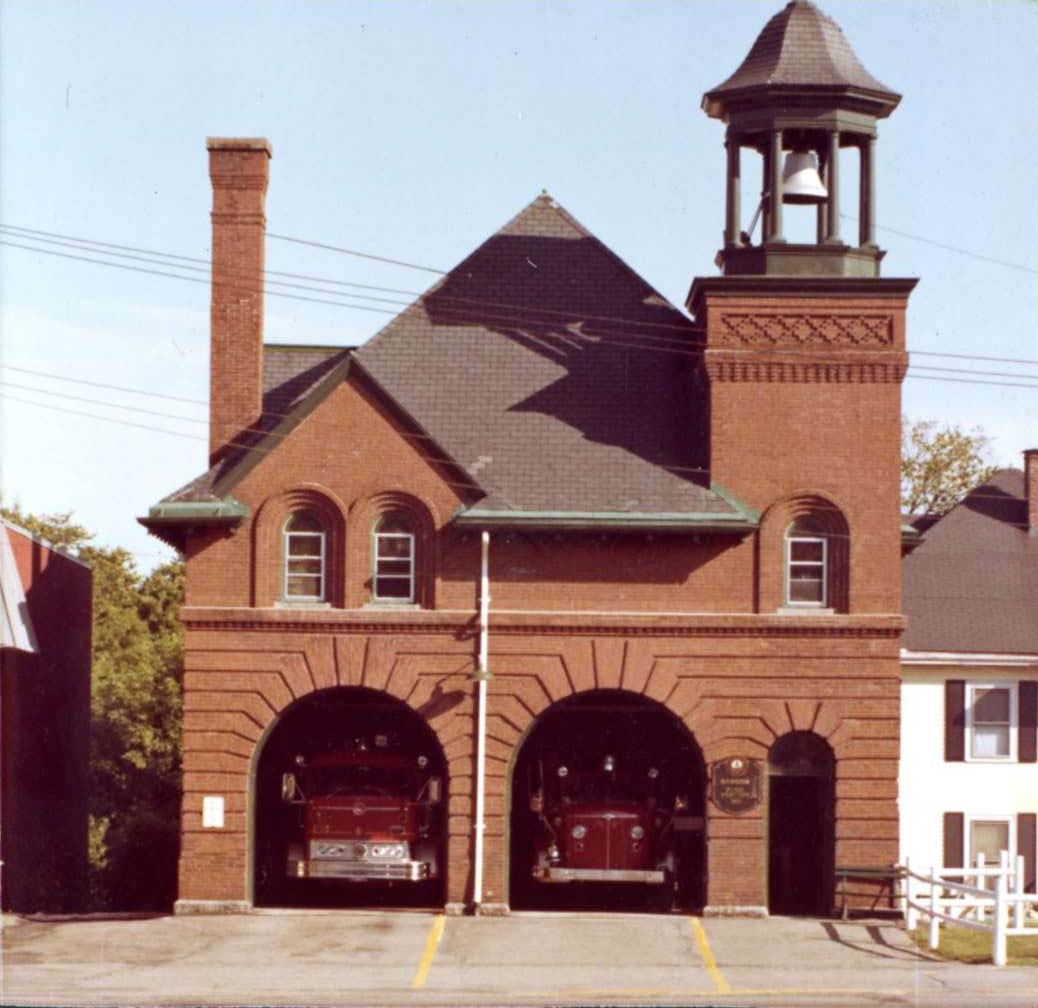
Bangor Hose House No. 5, Bangor, Maine, 1897

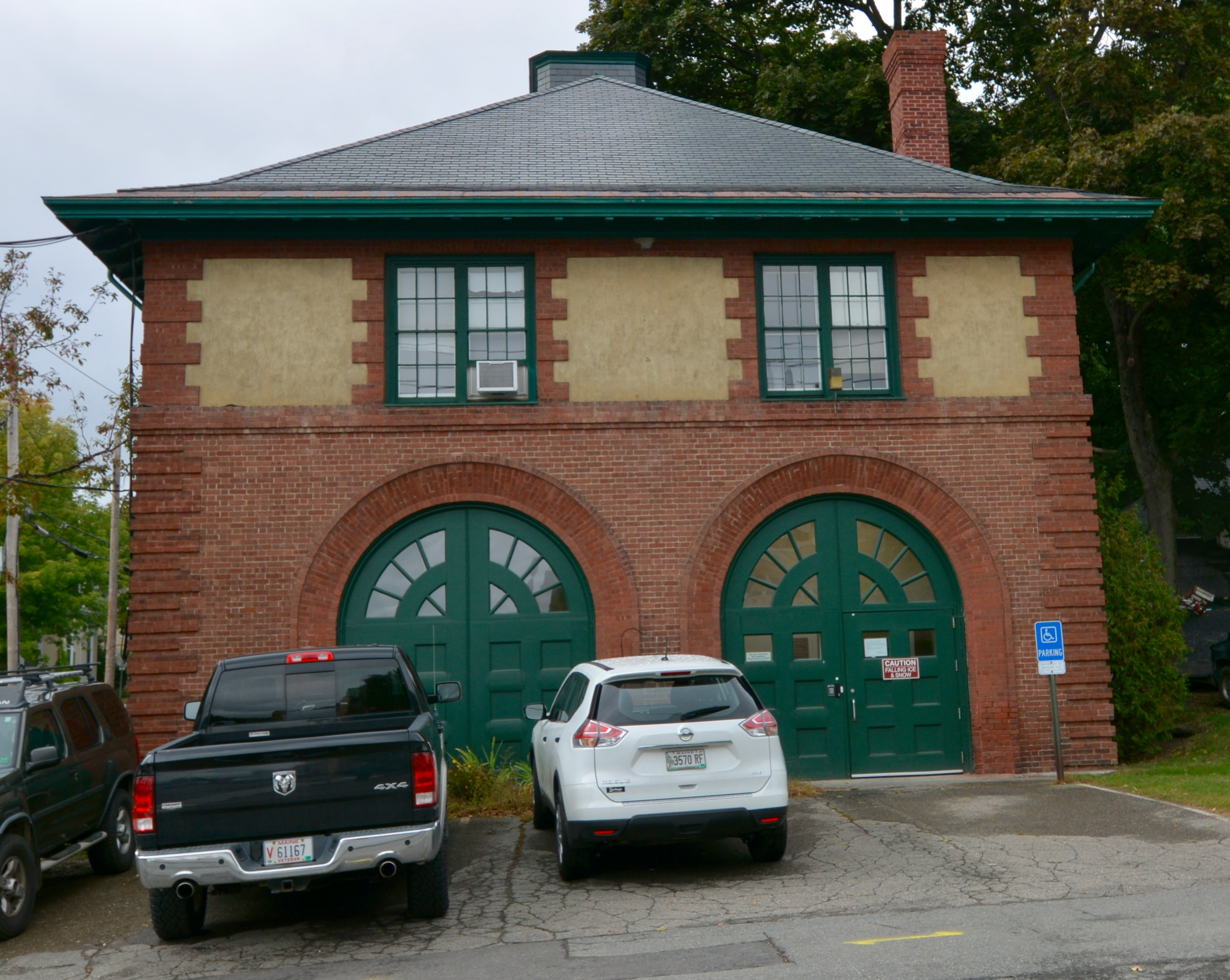
Bangor Fire Engine House No. 6, Bangor, Maine, 1902

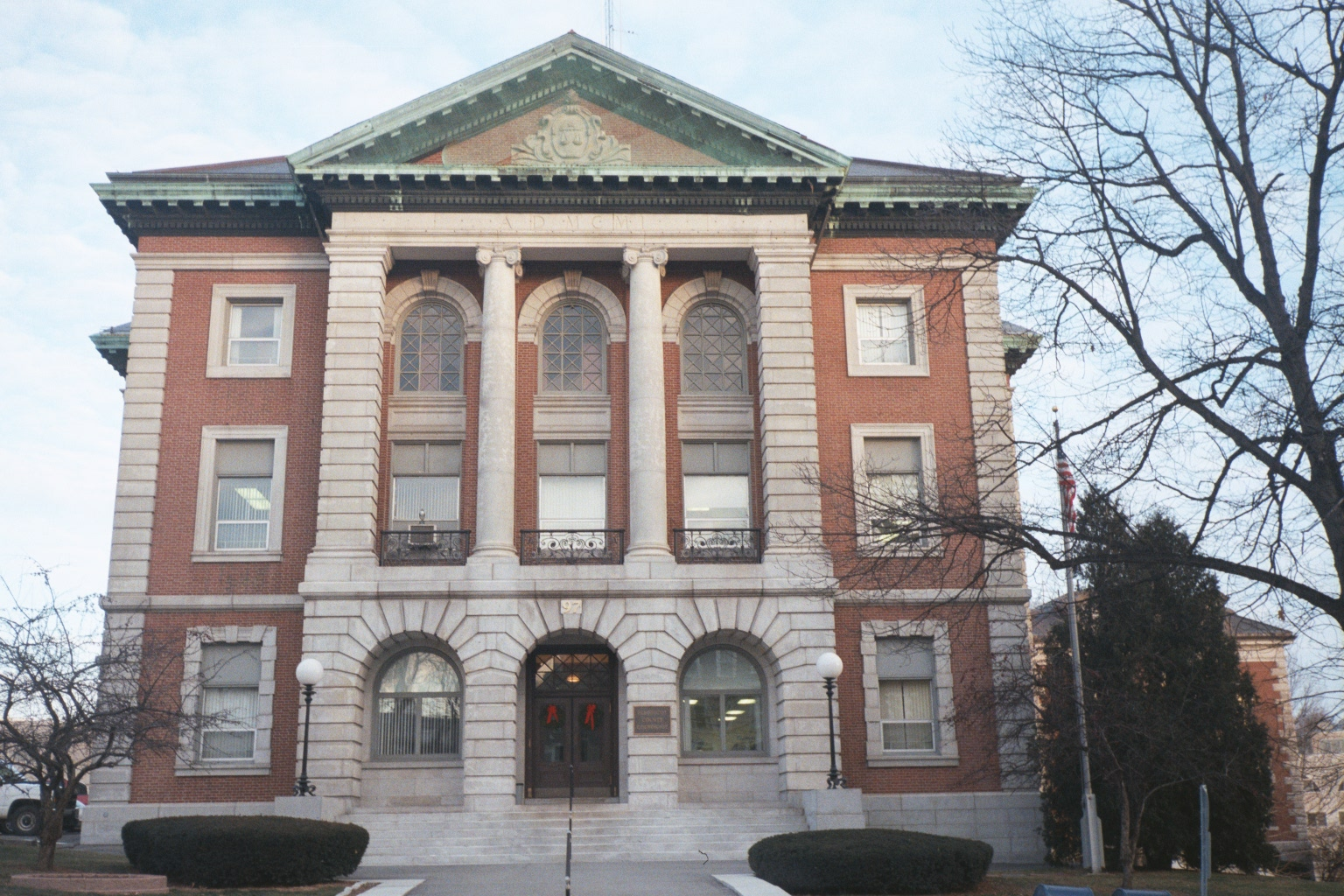
Penobscot County Courthouse, Bangor, Maine, 1902–05

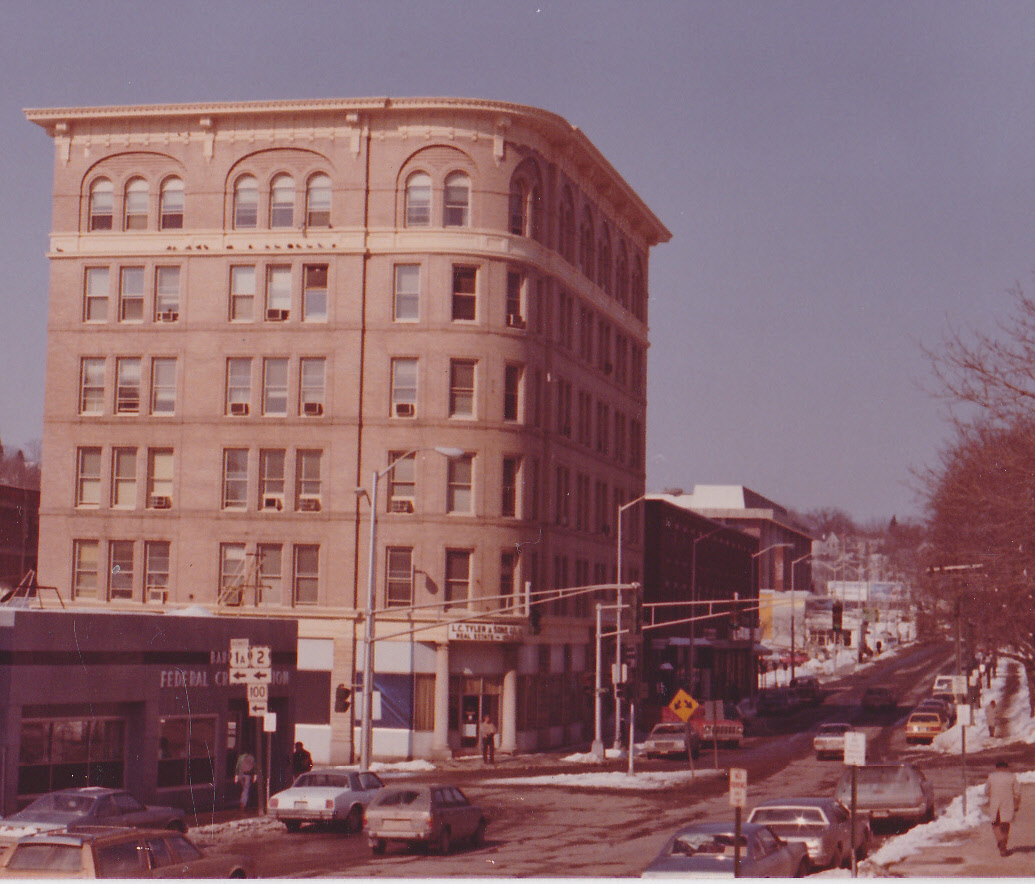
Graham Building, Bangor, Maine, 1911
