= Bangor Fire Engine House No. 6 =

- U.S. National Register of Historic Places
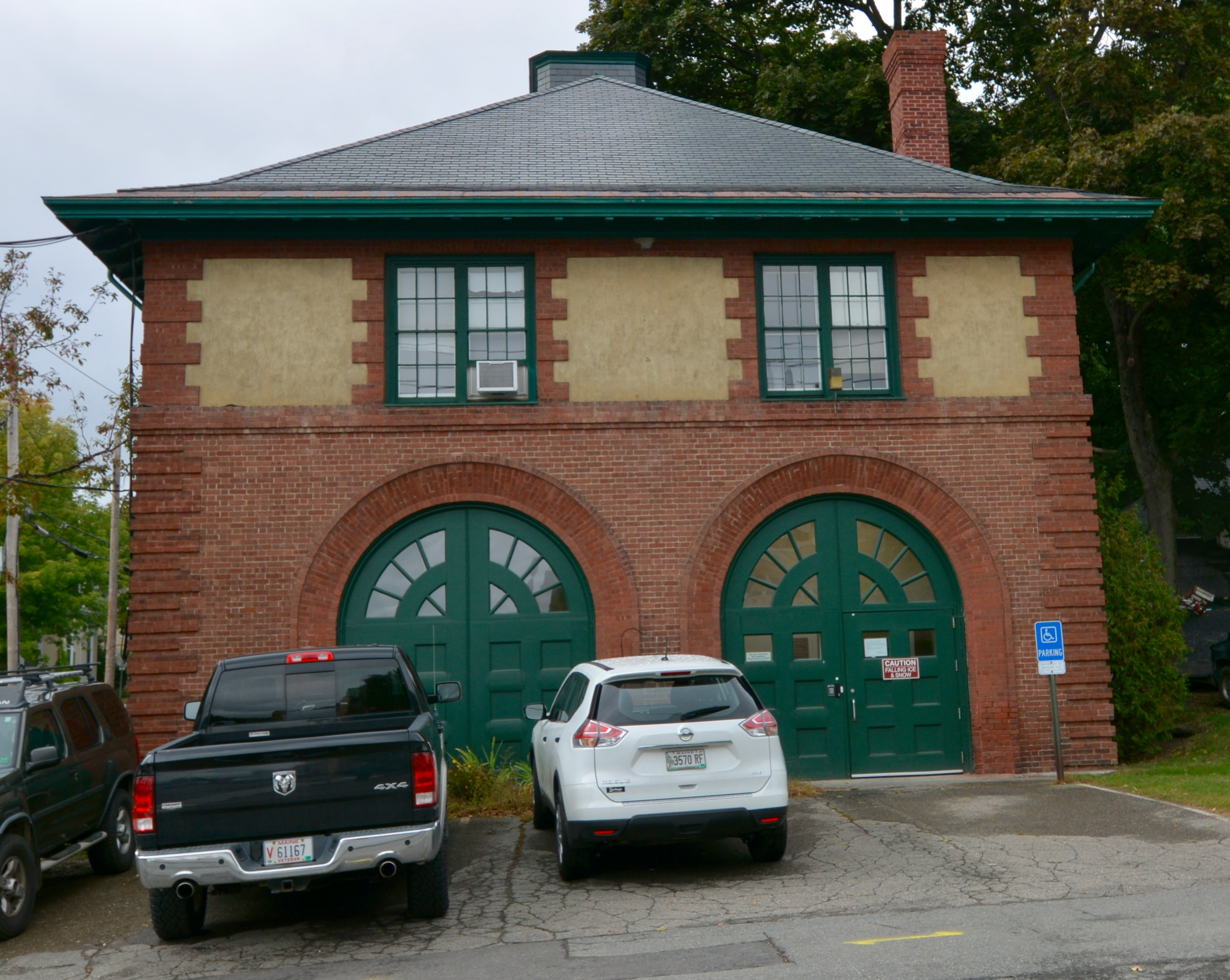

- Location within Maine Location within the United States
- Location: 284 Center St. Bangor, Maine
- Coordinates: 44.8136°N 68.7734°W
- Area: less than one acre
- Built: 1902; 124 years ago
- Architect: Wilfred E. Mansur
- Architectural style: Beaux Arts
- NRHP reference No.: 88000394
- Added to NRHP: April 7, 1988

The Bangor Fire Engine House No. 6 is a historic former fire station at 284 Center Street in Bangor, Maine. Built in 1902, it is a high quality local example of Beaux Arts architecture, and is one of a series of important public commissions by local architect Wilfred E. Mansur. The building was listed on the National Register of Historic Places on April 7, 1988.

== Description and history ==
The former Bangor Fire Engine House No. 6 is located in a predominantly residential area north of downtown Bangor, at the northwest corner of Center and Montgomery Streets. It is a rectangular two story building, built out of brick and stone, and topped by a slightly flared hip roof with the square base of a now-removed cupola at its center. The first floor is brick with brick quoining at the corners. The second floor is finished in stuccoed brick, with brick quoining at the corners and on the sides of the window openings. The first-floor street-facing openings are set in rounded-arch openings, with two former equipment bay entrances facing Center Street, and a central pedestrian entrance bay facing Montgomery. One of the equipment bays has been adapted to house a second pedestrian entrance.

The fire house was built in 1902, and was one of a series of public commissions by architect Wilfred E. Mansur that include the listed Bangor Hose House No. 5, and some of the city's schools. Built in the days when fire equipment was drawn by horses, it served as a fire station until 1987. At the time of its National Register listing in 1988, it had been converted to commercial use.

== See also ==
- National Register of Historic Places listings in Penobscot County, Maine
