= Graham Building =

Graham Building may refer to:

- The Birthplace of Ronald Reagan, also known as the Graham Building, Tampico, Illinois
- Graham Building (Aurora, Illinois), listed on the NRHP in Illinois
- Graham Building (Bangor, Maine), a commercial building in Bangor, Maine
- The Jackson Graham Building, headquarters of the Washington Metropolitan Area Transit Authority
- First National Bank (New Cumberland, West Virginia), also called the Graham Building
