= Broadway Historic District (Bangor, Maine) =

Historic district in Maine, United States

- U.S. National Register of Historic Places
- U.S. Historic district
- John Bapst Memorial High School

- Location within Maine Location within the United States
- Location: Bounded by Garland, Essex, State, Park and Center Sts., Bangor, Maine
- Coordinates: 44.805°N 68.768°W
- Area: 50 acres (20 ha)
- Built: 1807
- Architect: multiple
- Architectural style: Greek Revival, Second Empire, Federal
- NRHP reference No.: 73000244
- Added to NRHP: May 07, 1973

The Broadway Historic District in Bangor, Maine, United States, bounded by Garland, Essex, State, Park, and Center Streets, is one of the residential neighborhoods that had been most favored by the city's lumber barons and business elites in the early to late 19th century. A second and slightly later Bangor neighborhood of primarily elite houses, centered on West Broadway, is also listed on the National Register of Historic Places as the Whitney Park Historic District. Both historic districts are also protected under local ordinance.

Broadway reflected Bangor's aspirations in the 1820s-1830s to become one of the chief port cities in New England, if not the East Coast. It was laid out roughly on the model of Boston's Beacon Hill, with a green strip running down the center for the first two blocks, planted with a double row of elm trees. A few blocks further on, the street bisects a large park (Broadway Park), which is the terminus of the historic district. The district also includes some immediate side streets of equal status, notably French Street, whose houses overlooked downtown Bangor from a bluff.

The first residences built along the street's green strip in the 1820s-30s were large brick double-houses and single-houses, again conformed to the city-scape of Boston. Typical of these early houses are the Hinkley House, a brick duplex built in the 1820s, and Fred Dickey House, an elegant Federal style house built in 1807. Within the first decade, however, brick had given way to fully detached wooden mansions, though the size and stylistic ambitions of the owners didn't diminish. The district features houses built in every period and style from the 1820s through the early 20th century (e.g. Greek Revival, Italianate, Second Empire, Colonial Revival, etc.). Part of the district was devastated by the Great Fire of 1911, and although most of the burned section was rebuilt, Broadway began to be abandoned as newer and more attractive elite neighborhoods began to open up (e.g. Little City and Fairmount Park). The construction of the large Catholic John Bapst High School in the center of the district in the 1920s, for which a number of mansions were demolished, was likely the tipping point in the neighborhood's conversion to mixed use.

== See also ==
- National Register of Historic Places listings in Penobscot County, Maine
