= Bangor Public Library =

Library in Bangor, Maine

Coordinates: 44.8043°N 68.7719°W

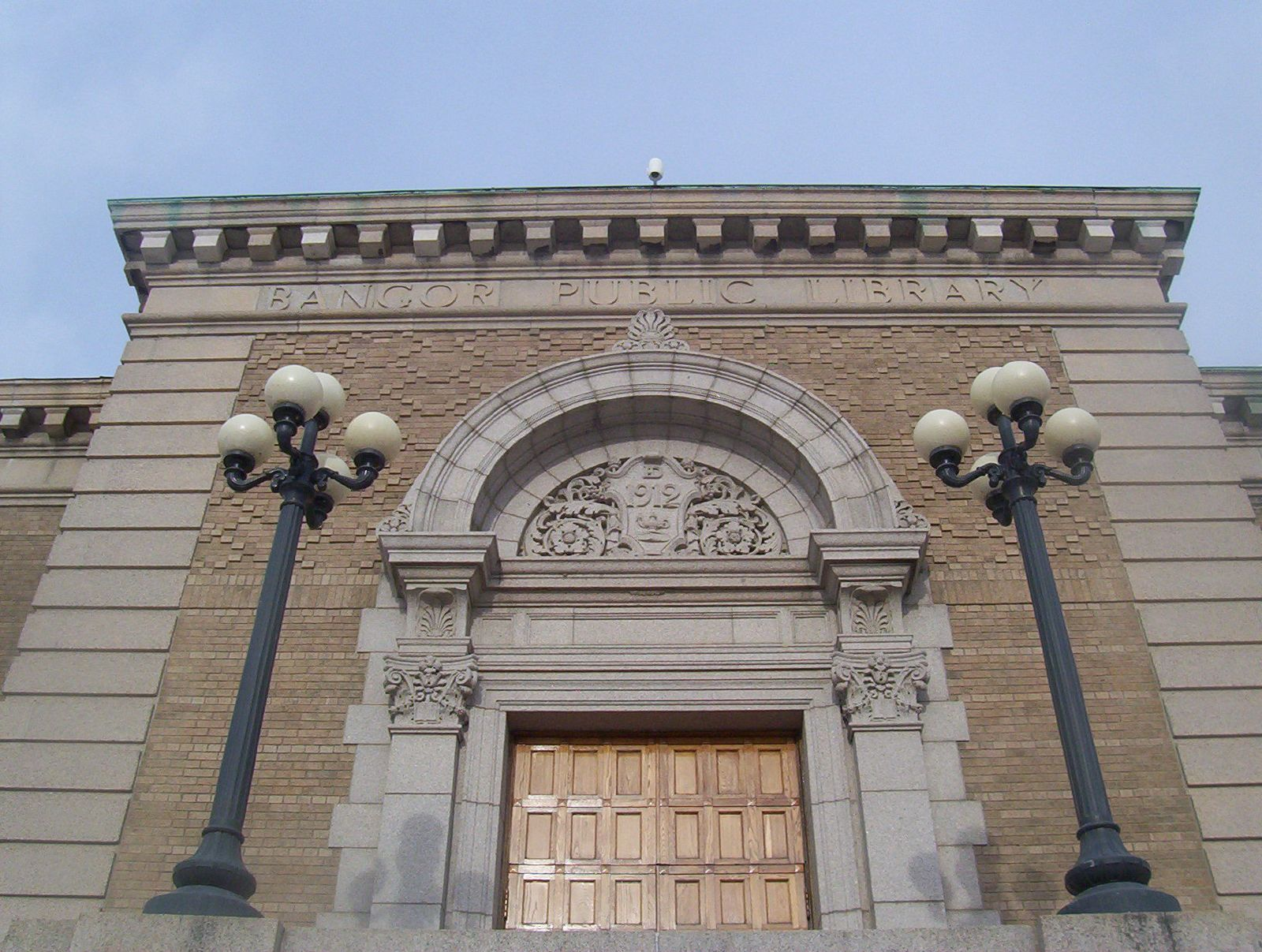
- Location: Bangor, Maine
- Established: 1913

Collection
- Size: 520,000

Access and use
- Population served: 35,473

Other information
- Budget: $2,388,577
- Director: Ben Treat
- Employees: 35
- Website: http://www.bpl.lib.me.us/
- Bangor Public Library
- U.S. Historic district – Contributing property
- Location within Maine Location within the United States
- Location: Harlow, Center, Park, State, York, and Central Streets; Bangor, Maine
- Built: 1911
- Architect: Peabody and Stearns
- Architectural style: Late 19th And Early 20th Century American Movements, Renaissance
- Part of: Great Fire of 1911 Historic District (ID84001479)
- Designated CP: June 14, 1984

The Bangor Public Library is the public library of Bangor, Maine. It shares the URSUS online cataloging system with the University of Maine and other Maine libraries.

The library's roots date to 1830, when the Bangor Mechanic Association assembled a private collection of books. In 1873, it absorbed several other associations' libraries and became the Bangor Mechanic Association Public Library.

In 1883, former U.S. Congressman and lumber baron Samuel F. Hersey left the City of Bangor a $100,000 bequest, which the city used to form a municipally owned public library. The Mechanic Association's 20,000 books formed the core collection. In 1905, the small membership fee was abolished and the library became truly open to all.

By 1911, the library's collection had grown to 70,000 books. Then came the Great Fire of 1911, which destroyed the library along with most of the Bangor Business District. The library reopened that May with the 29 books pulled from the ashes and 1,300 others that had been on loan. (Today, the library is listed on the National Register of Historic Places as part of the Great Fire of 1911 Historic District.)

In 1913, the library's new building, designed by the Boston architectural firm Peabody and Stearns, opened its doors near the high school.

In 1997, the library was renovated and a new wing added (designed by Robert A. M. Stern Architects), thanks to a donation from Stephen and Tabitha King. King's story The Library Policeman was inspired by his 10-year-old son's expressed fear of returning overdue books to the Bangor Public Library because of "the library police".

In 2014, the library was renovated again; plans included a new glass atrium designed by Scott Simons Architects.

In June of 2023, the library hired its first community resource navigator, Olivia Scott, MSW. The position was the first of its kind and paid for through American Rescue Act funds.

The couch that former vice president of the United States Hannibal Hamlin died on in 1891 is displayed in the library.
