= Graham Building (Bangor, Maine) =

Building in Maine, United States

Coordinates: 44°48′12″N 68°46′16″W

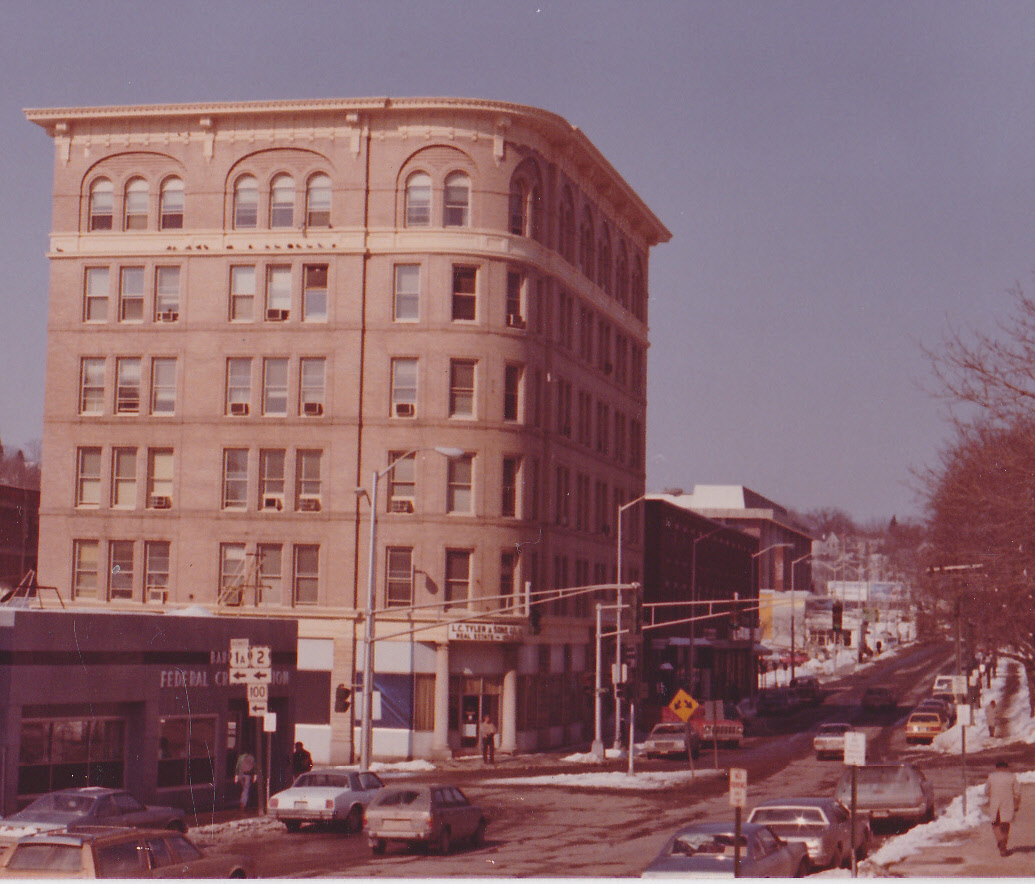
Graham Building (1911), Bangor, Maine

The Graham Building (built 1911) is a yellow-brick Romanesque Revival style commercial building in downtown Bangor, Maine, at the corner of Harlow and Central Streets. It is one of the most prominent buildings in the Great Fire of 1911 Historic District, which is listed on the National Register of Historic Places.

Designed by architect Wilfred E. Mansur, the building was commissioned by John R. Graham (1847–1915), president of the Bangor Hydro-Electric Company, formerly the Bangor Railway and Electric Company. Graham was largely responsible for managing Bangor's turn-of-the-century transition from lumber port to light industrial center through the provision of cheap electricity from dams across the Union River in Ellsworth, Maine and the Penobscot River at Veazie, Maine. Bangor was the first city in New England (and one of the first in the United States) with an electric street railroad system, thanks to an earlier local businessman, Francis Clergue, who went on to build one of North America's greatest hydro-power centers at Sault Ste. Marie, Ontario. Graham came to consolidate and manage Bangor's electrical utilities through his connections to the General Electric Corporation, which held a number of local investments.

The Graham Building was one of the first to be commissioned and finished following the disastrous Great Fire of 1911 which destroyed half of Bangor's commercial district. It stands six stories tall, and is built of yellow pressed brick with metal cornices and metal belt courses on the first and sixth stories. The main entrance on Harlow Street has cast-stone (or concrete) entrance details and a balustrade. It originally housed the offices of the Bangor Hydro-Electric Company and the Bangor and Aroostook Railroad, among others. The first story once housed the Post Office Pharmacy, as well as other retail stores, including The Willie Wags, 98 Wake N' Shake, BookMarcs, Accents, and Paloma's. The building currently has three retail spaces. The Maine Attorney General's Office is currently on the second floor of the building. The upper floors of the building are occupied by the owners of the building, Rudman Winchell, Counselors at Law.

A previous Graham Building, also named for John R. Graham, was located on an adjacent lot on Central Street, and was destroyed in the 1911 fire.
