= Phi Gamma Delta House =

- U.S. National Register of Historic Places
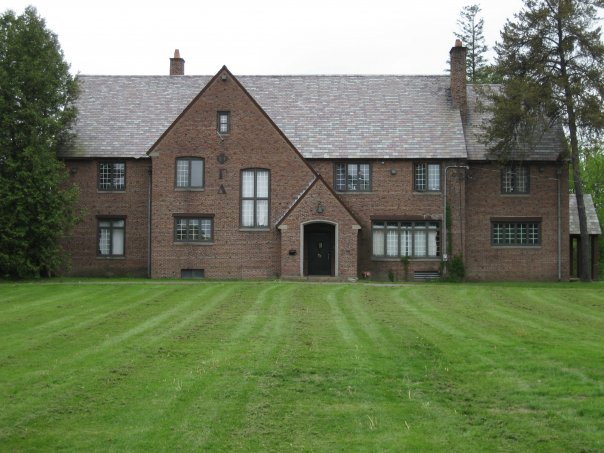

- Location within Maine Location within the United States
- Location: 79 College Avenue, Orono, Maine
- Coordinates: 44°53′31″N 68°40′22″W
- Area: less than one acre
- Built: 1925
- Architect: Crowell & Lancaster
- NRHP reference No.: 13000169
- Added to NRHP: April 16, 2013

Phi Gamma Delta House is an historic fraternity house at 79 College Avenue, near the campus of the University of Maine in Orono. It is the only Tudor Revival fraternity house on that campus, and was built to provide increased housing to the school's male student population. The architects were Crowell & Lancaster. It was listed on the National Register of Historic Places in 2013.

== Description and history ==
The Phi Gamma Delta House is located on the west side of College Avenue, at the southwestern edge of the University of Maine campus, and just east of the Stillwater River. It is the southernmost of a series of fraternity and sorority houses that line College Avenue. It is a large 2-1/2 story brick Tudor Revival structure with a side-gable slate roof and an asymmetrical projecting front-gable entry section. A second gable section projects from the rear at the building's northern end. The exterior is dark brick laid in common bond, with occasional glazed and rough-cut bricks adding texture. Windows are varied in size and dimensions. The projecting entry section has an asymmetrical roof line that is two stories at the left, and slopes down to the first floor on the right, joining a slightly-projecting gabled section where the door is located. The public spaces of the interior, especially the main living and dining areas, are richly decorated.

The house was built in 1925 to satisfy an overwhelming need for additional housing at the school, which then had only two male dormitories. The state legislature authorized the school to guarantee construction loans for fraternity houses in 1903, a step that helped alleviate its housing problems at that time. This house is the only house built under that program that is still in use by the original fraternity, and is the school's only Tudor Revival fraternity house.

== See also ==
- National Register of Historic Places listings in Penobscot County, Maine
- North American fraternity and sorority housing
