= Gallison Memorial Library =

- U.S. National Register of Historic Places
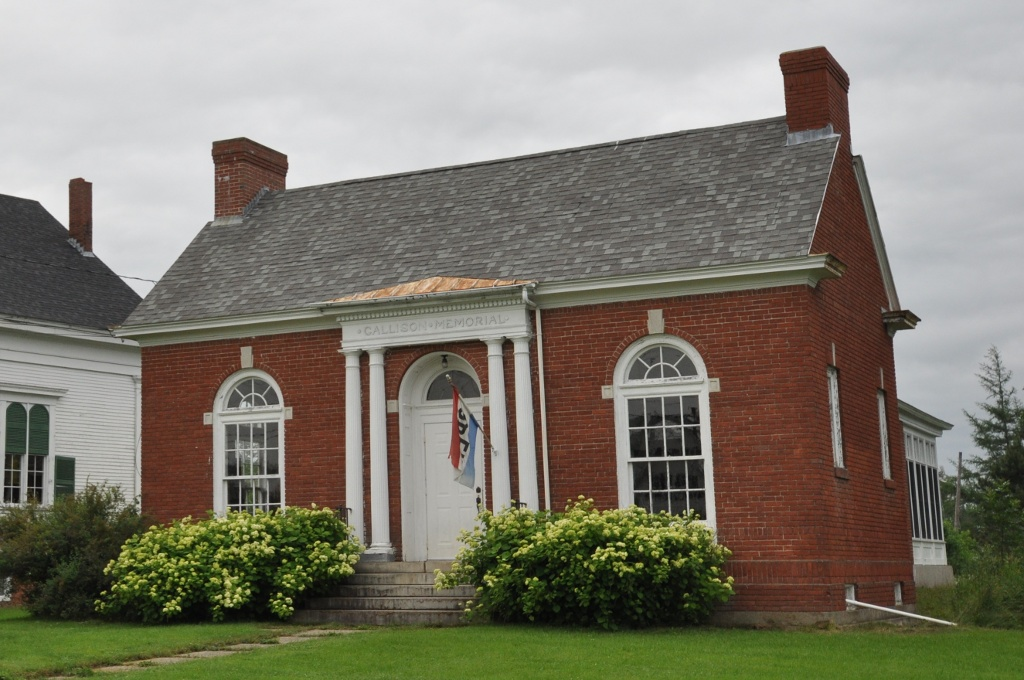

- Location within Maine Location within the United States
- Location: US 1, 0.5 mi. W of jct. with US 1A, Harrington, Maine
- Coordinates: 44°37′9″N 67°48′45″W
- Area: less than one acre
- Built: 1922
- Architect: Crowell & Lancaster
- Architectural style: Colonial Revival
- NRHP reference No.: 00001632
- Added to NRHP: January 11, 2001

Gallison Memorial Library is the public library of Harrington, Maine. It is located at 1292 Main Street (United States Route 1) in Harrington's rural village center, in a small architecturally distinguished Colonial Revival brick building that is listed on the National Register of Historic Places. The building was a gift to the town from Alice (Strout) Gallison in memory of her husband Forest, and was built in 1922–23, with a major expansion in 2004.

== Architecture and history ==
The Gallison Memorial Library is located on the north side of US Route 1, just east of Center Street and about 0.5 miles (0.80 km) west of the junction with US Route 1A. The street-facing original portion of the building is a small single-story brick building, with a side-facing gable roof, chimneys at the sides, and a concrete foundation. The front is symmetrical, with a center entrance flanked by fluted columns supporting an entablature, and a fanlight above the door. The outer bays have sash windows with round-arch fanlights above. The interior of this building is a single large room, with a fireplace at the east end and bookcases lining its walls. A modern addition is connected to the rear of the building, adding nearly 1,000 square feet for increased stack space and facilities for modern library services.

The oldest library in Harrington was a private subscription library run by the local Martha Washington Society. By 1883 the Village Library Association had been formed, based in part on the Society's donated collection, and in 1912 it purchased a building on the present site for its use. In 1921 Alice (Stout) Gallison donated funds for the construction of a new library in memory of her late husband Forest, both Harrington natives. The Bangor firm of Crowell & Lancaster designed the building, which was completed the following year. The addition to the rear was made about 2004.

== See also ==
- National Register of Historic Places listings in Washington County, Maine
