= Llewellyn J. Morse =

American politician and merchant (1819–1902)

Llewellyn J. Morse (December 19, 1819 – October 24, 1902) was a politician and merchant of lumber and ice in Maine. He founded Morse & Co. in 1851. The company was headquartered in Bangor, Maine. It became Oliver, Haight & Morse when he took on partners. Ralph W. Morse joined the firm in 1866 (he died in 1870) and L.J.'s son Walter I. Morse joined the firm in 1874.

Morse was born at Parkers Head along the Kennebec River. In the 1870s Morse was an alderman in Penobscot, Maine. Morse served in the Maine House of Representatives in 1874 and 1875 and was a Republican. His brother-in-law, Capt. Frank B. Ames, captained the ship named for Morse, the Llewellyn J. Morse (built 1877). The ship later stood in for the USS Constitution in the 1926 film Old Ironsides.

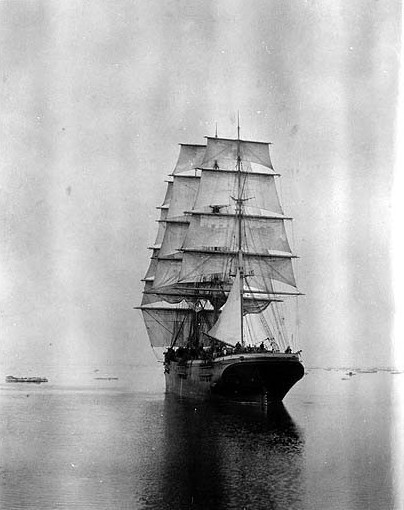
Llewellyn J Morse in the Bering Sea of Alaska

His brother-in-law became ill and upon his return home from captaining a voyage in Asia on the Llewellyn committed a murder-suicide on his sleeping wife.

The Morse & Co. Office Building is a historic site listed on the National Register of Historic Places.

== History ==
During the American Civil War in 1863 he served under John L. Hodsdon. Future Vice President of the United States Hannibal Hamlin served under Capt. Llewelyn J. Morse at Fort McClary in Maine.
