= James Sullivan Wiley House =

Historic house in Maine, United States

- U.S. National Register of Historic Places
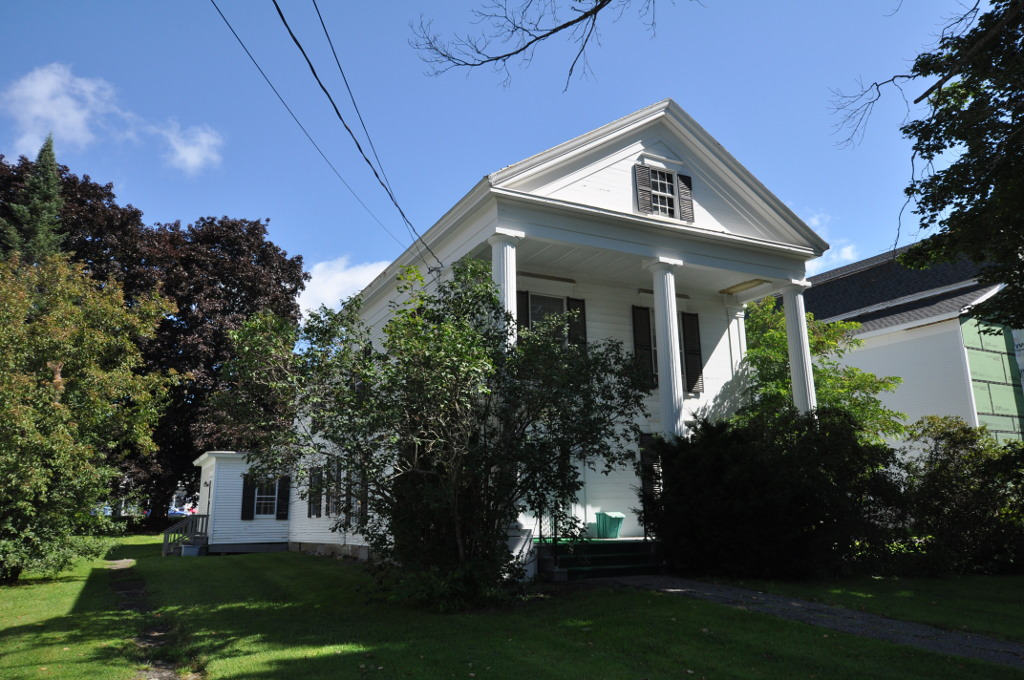

- Location within Maine Location within the United States
- Location: Main St., Dover-Foxcroft, Maine
- Coordinates: 45°11′1″N 69°13′31″W
- Area: 1 acre (0.40 ha)
- Built: 1849
- Architectural style: Greek Revival
- NRHP reference No.: 76000111
- Added to NRHP: November 21, 1976

The James Sullivan Wiley House is a historic house at 148 East Main Street in Dover-Foxcroft, Maine. A fine Greek Revival house with a temple front, it was built in 1849 by James Sullivan Wiley, a prominent local lawyer and teacher who also represented the area in the United States Congress for one term. The house was listed on the National Register of Historic Places in 1976. The building now houses offices of the Charlotte White Center, a social service agency.

== Description and history ==
The Wiley House is set on the north side of East Main Street, not far from the center of Dover-Foxcroft, the seat of Piscataquis County. It is a 2 1/2-story wood-frame structure, with a front-gable roof and a high granite foundation. Most of the house is finished in wooden clapboards; the front is finished in flushboarding that resembles stone. The roof extends over the front facade to form a portico with a triangular pediment supported by three slender Doric columns. The pediment houses a small sash window. Under the portico the facade is two bays wide, with the entrance in the left bay. The entry is flanked by sidelight windows and pilasters and topped by an entablature.

The house was built in 1849 by James Sullivan Wiley, a native of Mercer who became principal of Foxcroft Academy after graduating from Waterville (now Colby) College in 1836. He became a lawyer, and served one term (1847–49) in the United States Congress. He lived here until 1889. The house he built is a fine local example of a temple-fronted Greek Revival residence.

== See also ==
- National Register of Historic Places listings in Piscataquis County, Maine
