= Morse & Co. Office Building =

Historic place in Maine, United States

- U.S. National Register of Historic Places
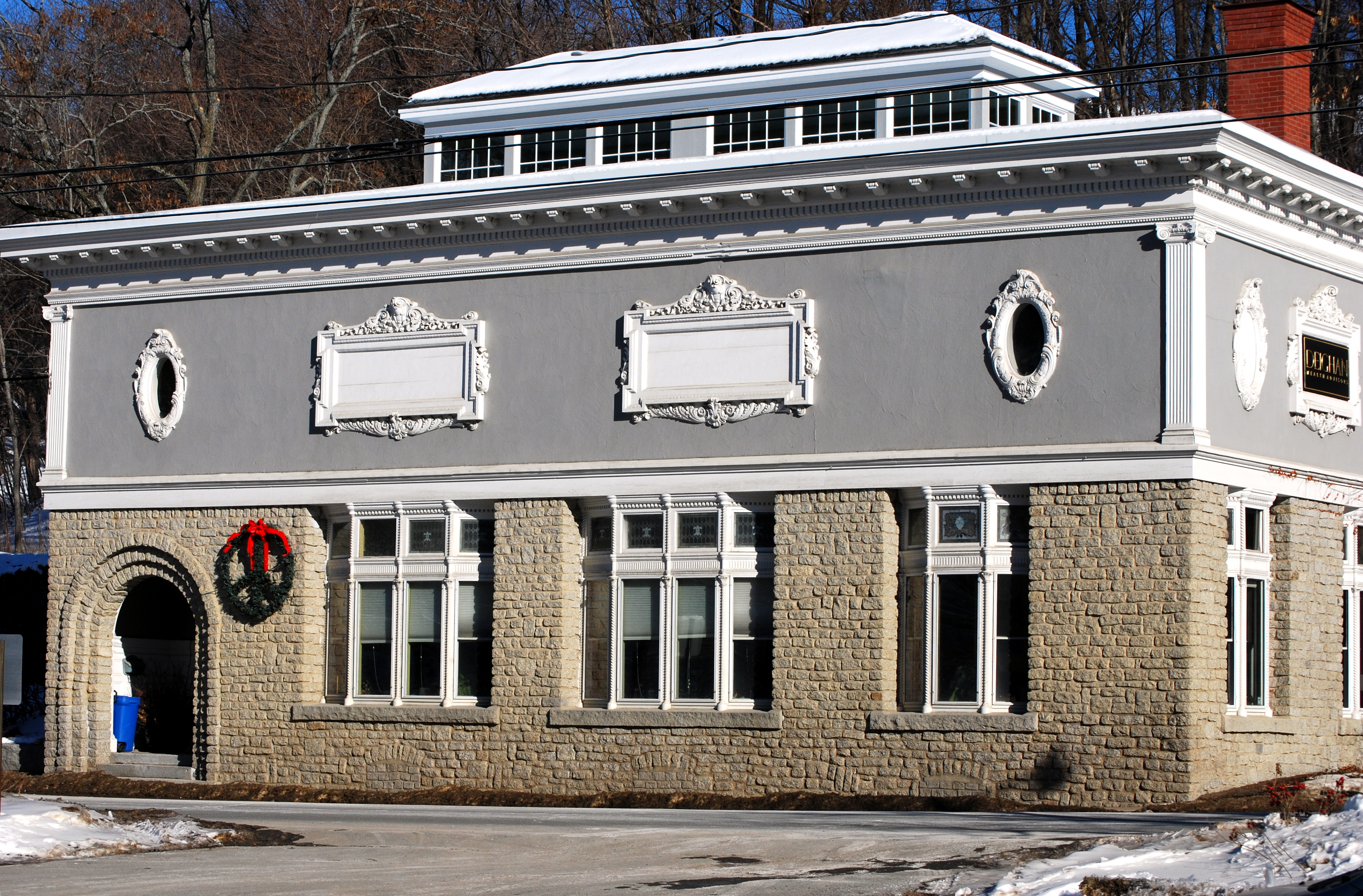

- Location within Maine Location within the United States
- Location: 455 Harlow St., Bangor, Maine
- Coordinates: 44°48′27″N 68°46′39″W
- Area: less than one acre
- Built: 1895
- NRHP reference No.: 73000139
- Added to NRHP: April 2, 1973

The Morse & Co. Office Building is a historic commercial building at 455 Harlow Street in Bangor, Maine. Built in 1895, it was the headquarters for Morse & Company, one of the city's largest employers for nearly 100 years, and the last operator of a lumber mill (its most important industry for many years) in the city. The building was listed on the National Register of Historic Places in 1973.

== Description and history ==
The Morse & Co. building is set on the northeast side of Harlow Street, just south of its crossing of Kenduskeag Stream and northwest of the city's central business district. It is a two-story masonry structure, finished in mortared brick-shaped stone on the first floor and stucco on the second. An arched opening on the left side of the front facade shelters the entrance, with three recessed bay windows to the right. The second story has corner pilasters and Beaux Arts panels flanked by oculus windows with decorative surrounds. The cornice has dentil molding and modillions below a dormered hip roof.

Morse & Co. was founded in 1851 by Llewellyn J. Morse and Hiram P. Oliver, who leased and later purchased an 1814 sawmill on Kenduskeag Stream. The company was for many years a leading local lumber processor, but engaged in a wide array of other businesses, including the grinding of corn and salt, and the harvesting of ice. The company's products were used extensively in the rebuilding of Bangor after the Great Fire of 1911, and in the Victorian-era townhouses of Beacon Hill in Boston, Massachusetts. The company ended operations in 1948, resulting in the closure of the city's last lumber mill. This building was built as its headquarters and showroom in 1895.

== See also ==
- National Register of Historic Places listings in Penobscot County, Maine
