= James S. Wiley =

American politician (1808–1891)

James Sullivan Wiley

Member of the U.S. House of Representatives from Maine's 6th district
- In office March 4, 1847 – March 3, 1849
- Preceded by: Hannibal Hamlin
- Succeeded by: Charles Stetson

Personal details
- Born: January 22, 1808 Mercer, Massachusetts (now Maine)
- Died: December 21, 1891 (aged 83) Fryeburg, Maine
- Resting place: Smart Hill Cemetery
- Party: Democratic

James Sullivan Wiley (January 22, 1808 – December 21, 1891) was a U.S. representative from Maine.

== Life ==
Born in Mercer, Massachusetts (now in Maine), Wiley moved to Bethel, Maine, in 1826 then attended Gould Academy and graduated from Colby College, Waterville, Maine, in 1836. He moved to Dover, Maine, and was an instructor at the Foxcroft Academy. He studied law and was admitted to the Piscataquis County bar in 1839 and commenced practice in Dover.

Wiley was elected as a Democrat to the Thirtieth Congress (March 4, 1847 – March 3, 1849). He resumed the practice of law in Dover. He moved to Fryeburg, Maine, in 1889 and continued the practice of law until his death in that town on December 21, 1891. He was interred in Smart Hill Cemetery.

Wiley's 1849 home in Dover-Foxcroft is listed on the National Register of Historic Places.

U.S. House of Representatives
Preceded by Hannibal Hamlin	Member of the U.S. House of Representatives from Maine's 6th congressional district March 4, 1847 – March 3, 1849	Succeeded by Charles Stetson
