= Bangor Hose House No. 5 =

- U.S. National Register of Historic Places
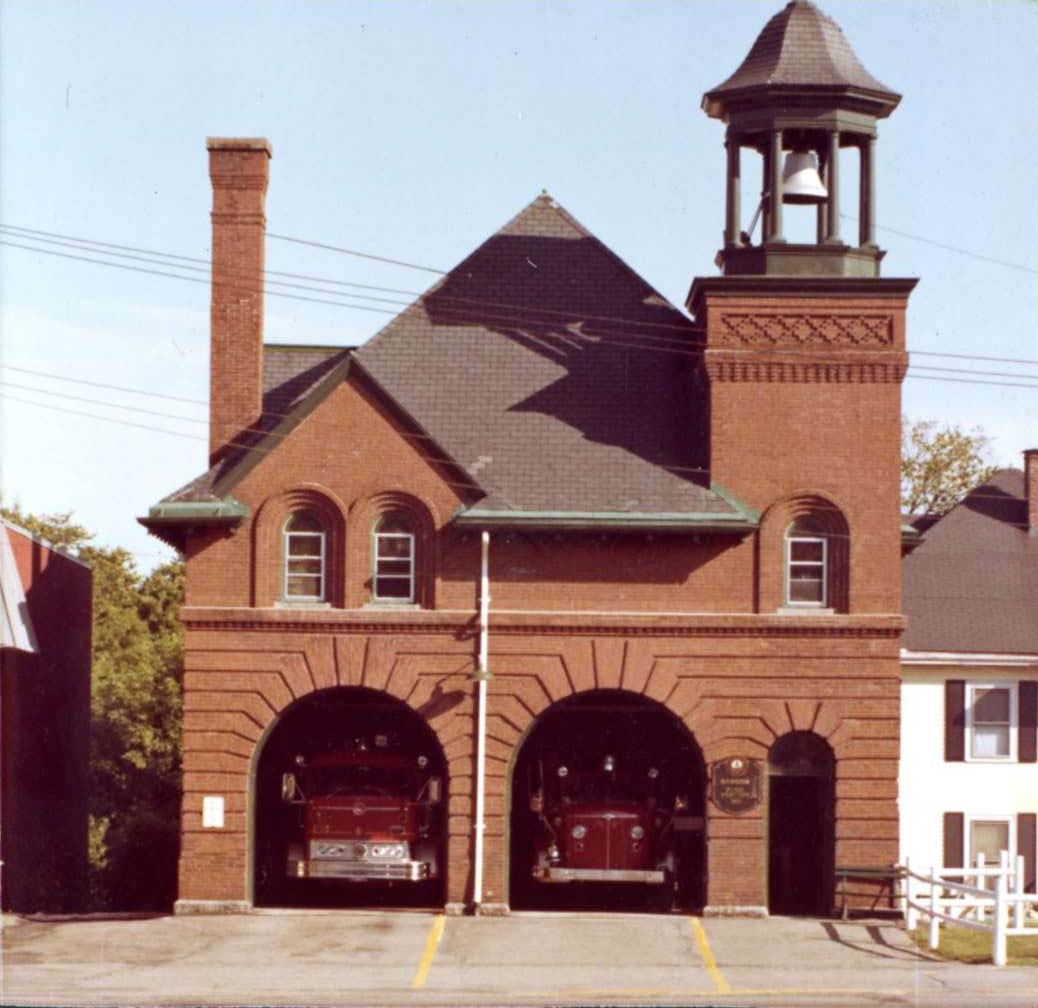
- Engine and Hose Co. No. 5

- Location within Maine Location within the United States
- Location: 247 State Street, Bangor, Maine
- Coordinates: 44.8057°N 68.7599°W
- Area: less than one acre
- Built: 1897
- Architect: Wilfred E. Mansur
- Architectural style: Romanesque
- NRHP reference No.: 97001130
- Added to NRHP: September 11, 1997

Bangor Hose House No. 5 (originally called Hose 8, and also known as the State Street Fire Station), is an historic fire station at 247 State Street in Bangor, Maine. Built in 1897, it served as a fire house for about a century. It now houses the Hose 5 Fire Museum, a city-operated museum devoted to its fire history. It was listed on the National Register of Historic Places in 1997.

== Description and history ==
The former House House No. 5 is a two-story brick building, standing on the south side of State Street (United States Route 2), east of downtown Bangor, between Salem Court and Merrimac Street. It is Romanesque Revival in style, with a dormered hip roof and a three-story hose drying tower topped by an open belfry. It has two round-arch equipment bays, with a pedestrian entrance, also round-arched to their right. Second-floor windows are recessed in corbelled round-arch openings, and the tower features a band of decorative brickwork below the belfry.

The building was built in 1897 from a design by Bangor architect Wilfred E. Mansur, and represents one of his finest works in the Romanesque style. Built in the days when fire equipment was drawn by horses, it served the city as a fire station until 1993, when it was converted into a museum, which is operated by the members of the Bangor Fire Department. It is home to several antique fire engines as well as Gamewell Fire Boxes, a collection of antique breathing apparatus, and other historic fire fighting equipment and engines. Admission is free, open by appointment through the summer.

== See also ==
- National Register of Historic Places listings in Penobscot County, Maine
