= Whitney Park Historic District =

Historic district in Maine, United States

- U.S. National Register of Historic Places
- U.S. Historic district
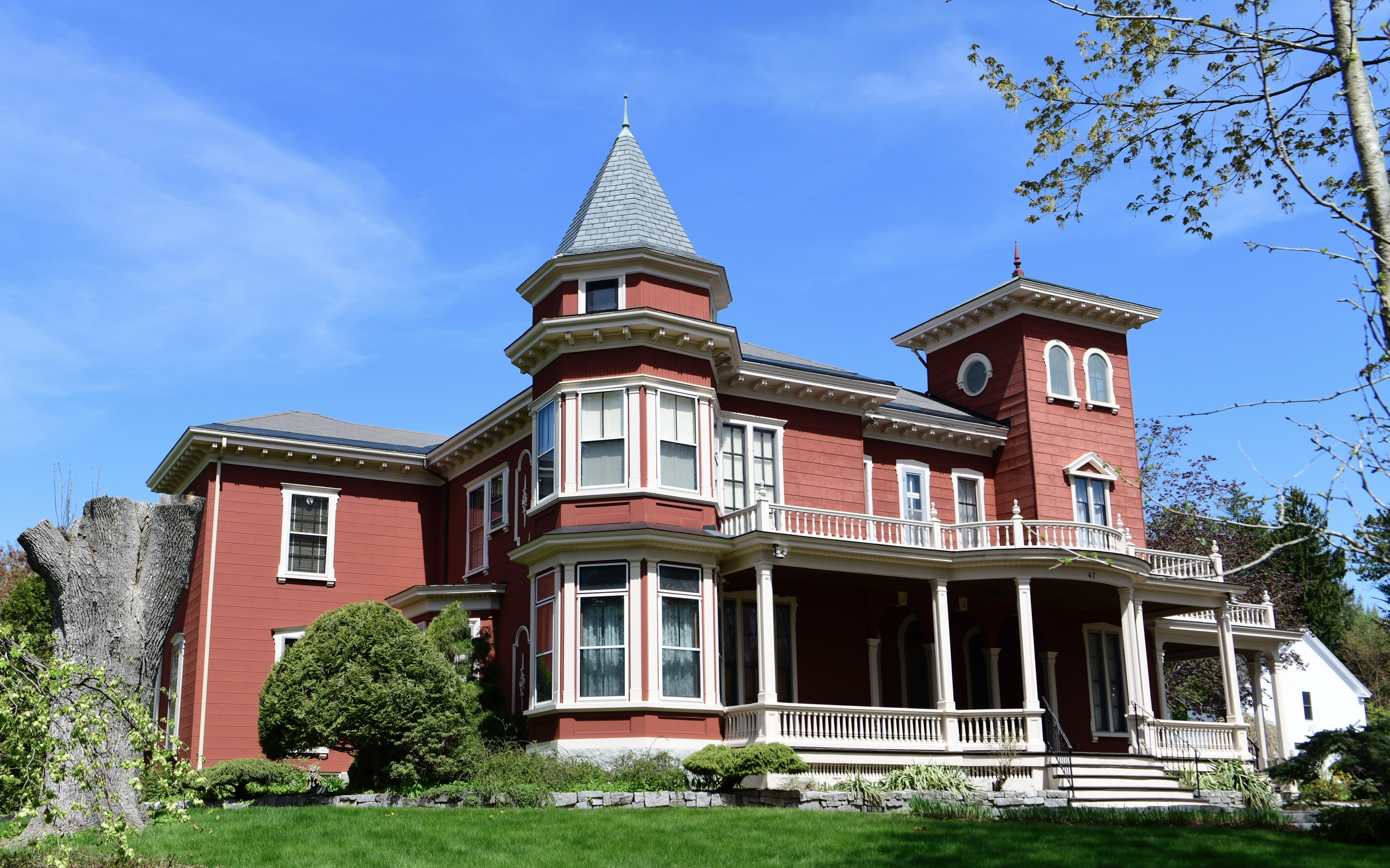

- Location within Maine Location within the United States
- Location: Roughly bounded by 8th, Union, Pond and Hayford Sts., Bangor, Maine
- Area: 18 acres (7.3 ha)
- Architect: Multiple
- Architectural style: Colonial Revival, Italianate, Queen Anne
- NRHP reference No.: 88001844
- Added to NRHP: October 13, 1988

The Whitney Park Historic District is a residential historic district on the west side of Bangor, Maine. The district contains 42 residential properties built between 1850 and 1910, a major period of the city's growth, and is anchored on its south by Whitney Park, a small triangular park at Hammond and Cedar Streets. The district was listed on the National Register of Historic Places in 1988, and is protected by the city's local historic district ordinance.

== Description and history ==
Whitney Park is located on the west side of Bangor, on the north side of Hammond Street (Maine State Route 100) and south of Cedar Street. North of the park, roughly bounded by Cedar, West Broadway, Union Street, and Pond Street, stand a collection of well-preserved houses noted for their homogeneity of scale and setting. This area was platted and development begun in the 1850s, a time when Bangor was booming as one of the major lumber processing and shipment points in the United States. The houses in the district are architecturally diverse, representing a cross section of architectural styles popular between 1850 and 1910. The district is bounded by commercial development and the Bangor Theological Seminary to the south, later 20th-century residential development to the north, and an older residential area to the east.

The oldest building in the district is the Charles Jennings House at 15 Hayward Street. Built c. 1851-53, it is a relatively modest Greek Revival Cape that has been augmented by Colonial Revival alterations. There are a number of stylish Italianate houses, the most elaborate of which is probably that of William Arnold at 47 West Broadway; it is a rambling two-story structure with two towers. Lining West Broadway are also a series of Second Empire houses with mansard roofs. The West Broadway house lots were among the first to be laid out, and are larger (about 1 acre (0.40 ha)) than those found on other streets in the district. Later styles, including Queen Anne, Shingle, and the Colonial Revival, are well represented in the remainder of the district.

== See also ==
- National Register of Historic Places listings in Penobscot County, Maine
