= Great Fire of 1911 =

Fire in Bangor, Maine

Coordinates: 44°48′11″N 68°46′12″W

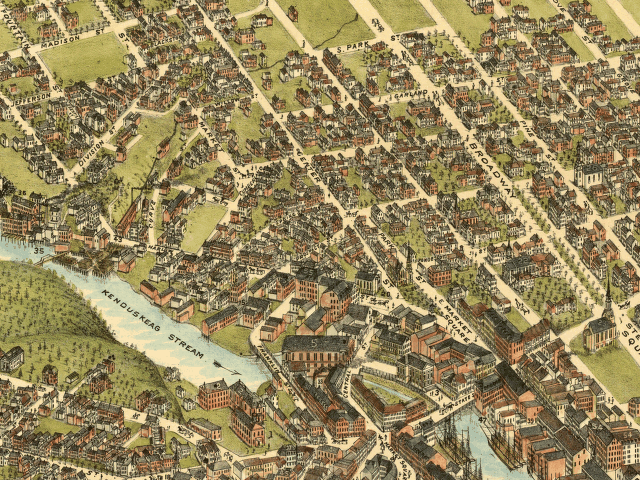
Primary area of fire in 1875

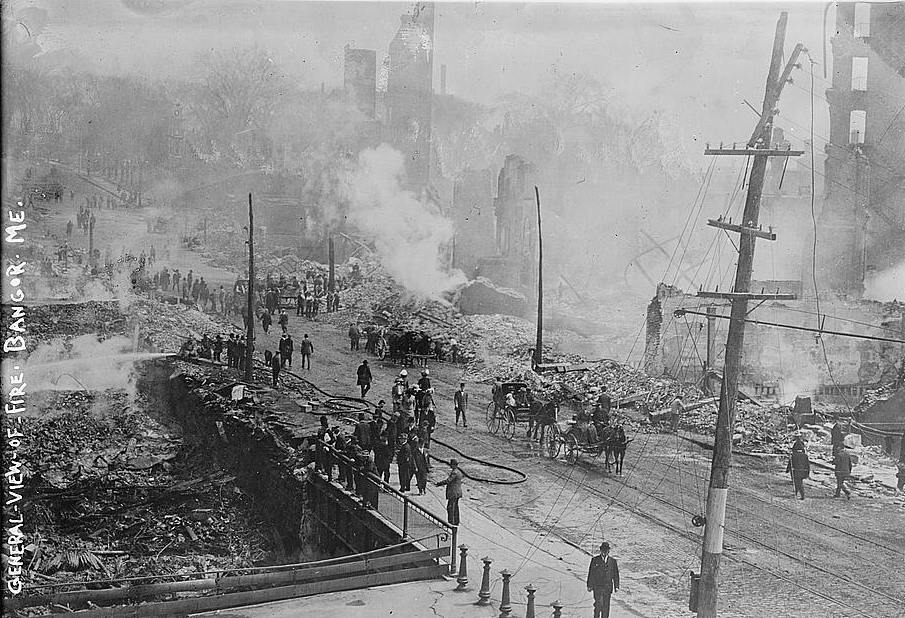
Aftermath of the fire

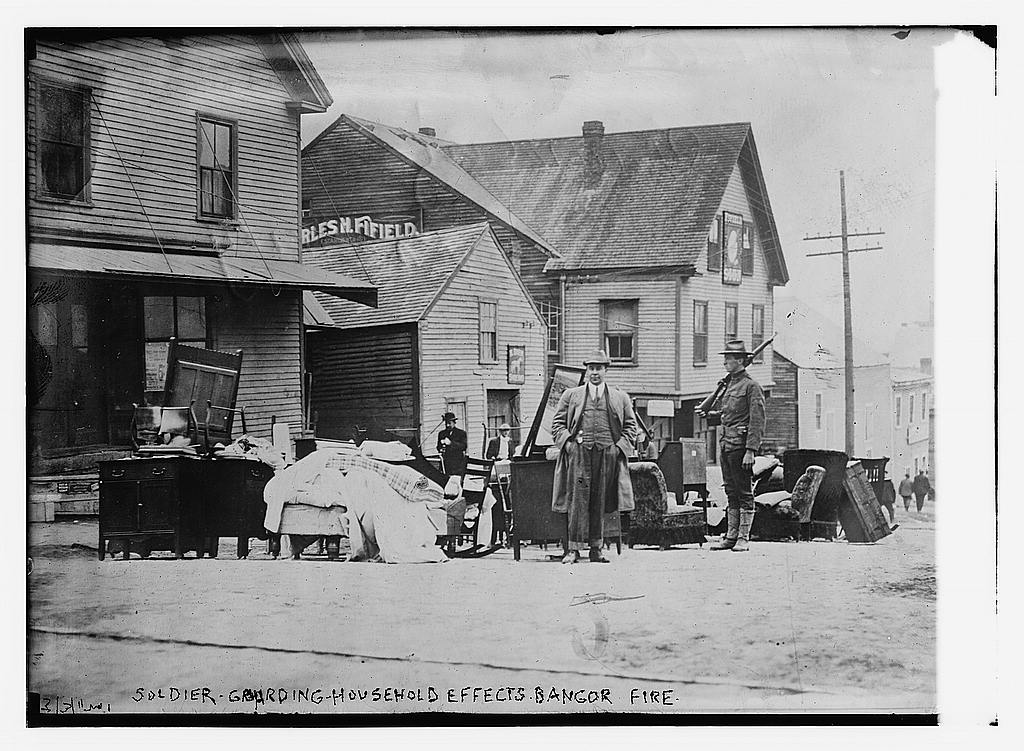
Great Fire of 1911 with soldier guarding household contents

The Great Fire of 1911 took place in Bangor, Maine, United States, on April 30 and May 1, 1911. A small fire that started in a downtown shed went out of control and destroyed hundreds of commercial and residential buildings.

== History ==
It started in the afternoon of April 30, 1911, on Broad Street. High winds had spread it to a shed on Exchange Street and the Universalist Church on Center Street by 4:10 PM, from where it spread into the residential neighborhood on Center Street Hill. In 1907, the National Board of Fire Underwriters had mapped the fire geography of Bangor, and predicted that a large fire could have spread from that area.

The fire eventually became so large that the glow in the sky could be seen in Belfast. It was brought under control on Monday morning, May 1, 1911, but before it was out, it destroyed much of Downtown Bangor. The Post Office, the Custom House, and Norumbega Hall were lost, along with the three buildings of Bangor High School and the Bangor Public Library. Somehow, City Hall survived, despite being in the direct path of the fire. The library's collection of 70,000 volumes was destroyed, along with much of the Bangor Historical Society's collection. An attempt to slow the fire by dynamiting buildings in its path failed. A light rain that began overnight did much to bring the fire under control. In total, 285 residences, 100 businesses, and 6 churches were destroyed, doing $3.2 million damage and leaving hundreds homeless. Before the fire, insurance companies had considered Bangor a good risk.

Remarkably, only two people died: one Brewer man who was caught in electrical wiring while crossing a bridge, and one firefighter.

Fire crews were called from as far away as Lewiston and Portland. After the telephone company caught fire, the wire chief climbed a pole and cut in on a trunk line to make aid calls. One team that was sent up from Boston, Massachusetts, ended up fighting a fire in Portland when their train stopped there.

The area destroyed by the fire was quickly rebuilt, with many architectural commissions going to New York and Boston firms (such as Carrere and Hastings and Peabody and Stearns), as well as local designers Wilfred E. Mansur, C. Parker Crowell, and Victor Hodgins. A large portion of the rebuilt area (43 buildings) was listed on the National Register of Historic Places in 1984 as the Great Fire of 1911 Historic District.
