= List of people from Bangor, Maine =

The following list includes notable people who were born or have lived in Bangor, Maine.

== Architects and engineers ==
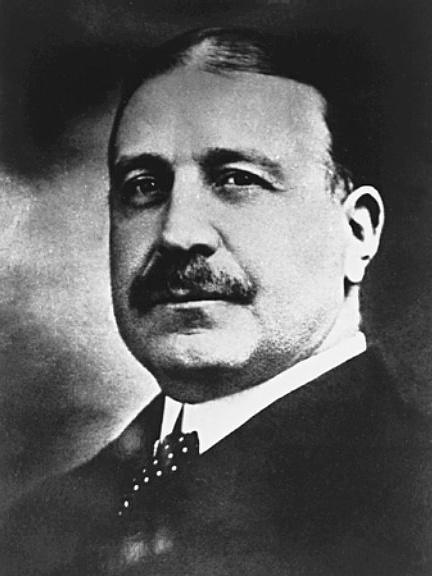
Francis Clergue

- Charles G. Bryant (1803–1858), Maine's first architect, lived and practiced in Bangor in the 1830s and designed Mount Hope Cemetery, the second garden cemetery in the U.S.; moved to Texas (Galveston) and became the first architect in that state, where, joining the Texas Rangers, he was eventually killed and scalped by Apache Indians
- Francis Clergue, born in neighboring Brewer; lawyer; oversaw one of the most ambitious engineering projects in North America, the development of Sault Ste. Marie, Michigan and Ontario as a major hydropower and industrial center in the 1890s–1900s; previously organized the Bangor Street Railway (the first electric railway in Maine) and the Bangor Waterworks, and had tried and failed to build a railroad across Persia and a waterworks in its capital, Tehran
- C. Parker Crowell, architect
- Benjamin S. Deane, architect
- Charles Davis Jameson, engineer who taught at MIT; went to China and became chief consulting engineer and architect to the Imperial Chinese Government (1895–1918); planned important hydraulics projects and witnessed the Boxer Rebellion
- Edward Austin Kent (1854–1912), leading architect in Buffalo, New York; three-time president of the American Institute of Architects; died aboard the RMS Titanic
- Wilfred E. Mansur, architect
- George W. Orff, architect
- Calvin Ryder, architect

== Artists ==
Artist Waldo Peirce (left), with brother and art-historian Hayford Peirce (right) and wives, before a night at the Bangor Opera in the 1930s

- Echo Eggebrecht, painter from New York, also a Bangor native
- Jeremiah Pearson Hardy (1800–1887), portrait painter; apprenticed under Samuel Morse; lived and worked in Bangor for most of his career, sustained largely by the patronage of lumber barons; his children Anna Eliza Hardy and Francis Willard Hardy, and sister Mary Ann Hardy, were also part of a 19th-century circle of Bangor painters
- Walter Franklin Lansil, studied first under Hardy, then at the Académie Julian in Paris; established a studio in Boston and became a celebrated landscape and marine artist
- Waldo Peirce, painter and bohemian; confidante of Ernest Hemingway; from a prominent Bangor family
- Helena Wood Smith (1865–1914), member of the artists' colony at Carmel-by-the-Sea, California, was murdered there by her lover, Japanese photographer George Kodani; sister of novelist Ruel Perley Smith
- Frederic Porter Vinton (1846–1911), left Bangor at age 14 for Boston, where he became its most sought-after portrait painter—producing over 300 canvases; one of the original members of the Boston School; studied at the Royal Academy of Munich and with Leon Bonnat in Paris, as well as with William Morris Hunt

== Athletes ==
Mary Freeman

- Frank Barbour, born in Bangor, head coach of the University of Michigan team, the Michigan Wolverines (1890s), after playing as quarterback of the national champion Yale University team of 1891
- Brian Butterfield, Boston Red Sox third base coach, born in Bangor
- Norman Cahners, of Bangor, qualified for the 1936 Olympic Team trials in track & field, but boycotted the event with Harvard track teammate Milton Green, because the games were to take place in Nazi Germany (Cahners and Green were Jewish); member of the Harvard Varsity Athletic Club Hall of Fame; built one of the largest publishing empires in America
- Adam Craig, cross-country biking champion, born in Bangor and grew up in nearby Corinth, Maine, member of the U.S. Biking Team at the 2008 Beijing Olympic Games
- Michael Daley, local boxer, Lightweight Boxing Champion of New England
- Marcus Davis, professional mixed martial arts (MMA) fighter; he and his Team Irish currently call Bangor their home
- Jon DiSalvatore, former National Hockey League player
- Mary Freeman, Bangor-born swimmer; competed in the 1952 Summer Olympics in Helsinki, Finland; sister-in-law of Grace Kelly
- Al Harris (born 1956), former National Football League player of the Chicago Bears and Philadelphia Eagles, from Bangor
- Emily Kagan (born 1981), mixed martial artist
- Matt Kinney, Major League Baseball player of the Minnesota Twins, Milwaukee Brewers, Kansas City Royals and now Japan's Seibu Lions
- Jack Leggett, Clemson University baseball coach
- Kevin Mahaney, of Bangor, won a silver medal in sailing at the 1992 Barcelona Olympic Games, reached the finals of the America's Cup trials with his Bangor-based PACT-95 team
- Chick Maynard, baseball shortstop
- Jack McAuliffe, world lightweight boxing champion in the 1880s–1890s, known as the "Napoleon of the ring", learned to fight growing up as a child in a tough Bangor neighborhood, retired with an unbeaten record
- Riley Masters, mid-distance runner
- Bobby Messenger, former Major League Baseball player (1901–1964) of the Chicago White Sox and St. Louis Browns
- Matthew Mulligan, of the New England Patriots, born in Bangor
- Pat O'Connell (1861–1943), of the Baltimore Orioles
- Harry Orman Robinson, head coach of the University of Texas football team, the Texas Longhorns (1890s), and before that the University of Missouri team, the Missouri Tigers
- Jack Sharrott (1869–1927), of the New York Giants and Philadelphia Phillies
- Matt Stairs, Philadelphia Phillies hitter (native of New Brunswick, Canada)
- Jeff Turner, former National Basketball Association player of the New Jersey Nets and Orlando Magic; born in Bangor; won a gold medal at the 1984 Los Angeles Olympic Games as a member of the U.S. Basketball Team

== Authors ==
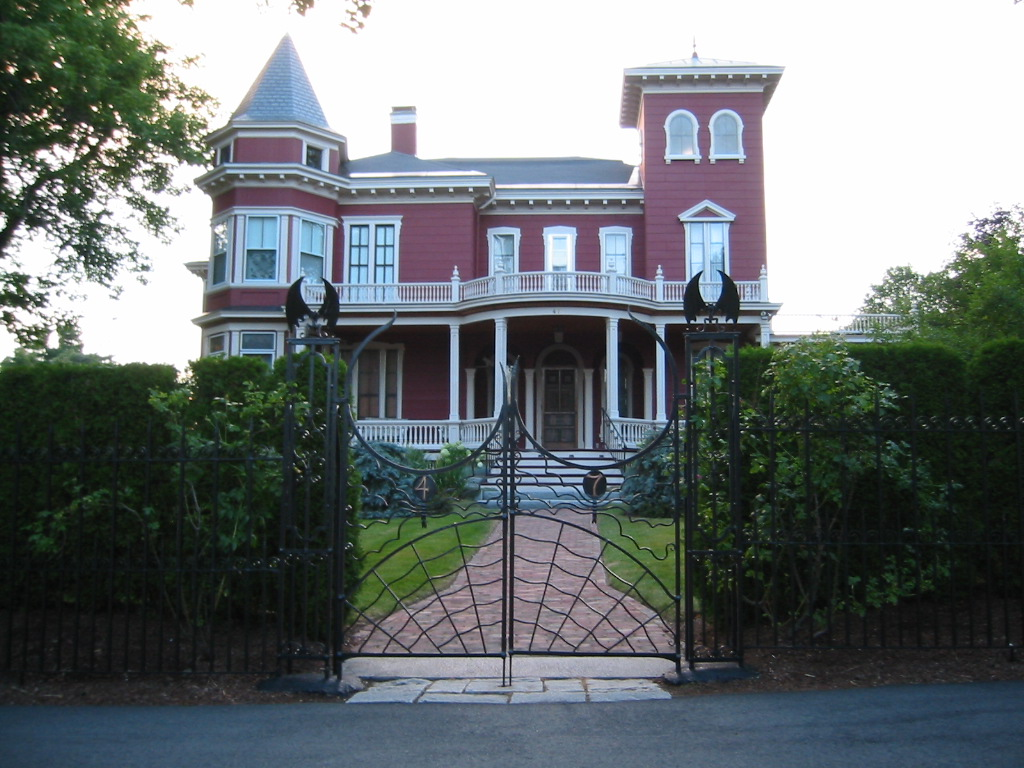
Stephen King's house

- Mabel Fuller Blodgett, wrote the novel At the Queen's Mercy when she was 19 years old
- Laura Curtis Bullard, whose family started a successful patent medicine business in Bangor in the 1830s, eventually moved to Brooklyn and became a proto-feminist novelist and editor. She was a patron and confidante of Susan B. Anthony and Elizabeth Cady Stanton and took over editorship of their newspaper The Revolution when it experienced financial difficulties
- Frederick H. Costello (1851–1921), nationally successful writer of adventure novels for young adults; for 30 years held a day job as local (Bangor) manager of the R.G. Dunn credit reporting company
- Owen Davis (1874–1956), Pulitzer Prize winning playwright; lived in Bangor until he was 15; his prize-winning play Icebound (1923) is set in neighboring Veazie; wrote between 200 and 300 plays, as well as radio and film scripts, and two autobiographies; inducted into the American Academy of Arts and Letters; president of the Author's League of America and the American Dramatist's Guild
- Henry Payson Dowst (1872–1921), Bangor-born; novelist and short-story writer; a number of his stories were made into silent films, including The Dancin' Fool (1920); spent his later life in a New York advertising agency, but was buried in Bangor
- David Fiske (1954–2023), born in Bangor, author and local historian
- Katya Alpert Gilden (1919–1991), of Bangor, co-authored with her husband Bert Gilden the best-selling 1965 novel Hurry Sundown, which became an Otto Preminger film in 1967
- Clarine Coffin Grenfell (1910–2004), poet and author, born and raised in Bangor
- Frederic Henry Hedge, Transcendentalist minister of the Congregational Church in Bangor in the 1830s; his circle, which included Ralph Waldo Emerson and Henry David Thoreau, met as "Hedge's Club" or the Transcendental Club whenever Hedge returned to his native Cambridge, Massachusetts
- Blanche Willis Howard, best-selling late 19th-century novelist; born and raised in Bangor; eventually moved to Stuttgart, Germany, and married the court physician to King Charles I of Württemberg, thus becoming the Baroness von Teuffel
- Stephen King, horror author; his family donates a substantial amount of money to local libraries and hospitals; funded a local baseball stadium and aquatic center; created fictional town, Derry, Maine, which shares many points of correspondence with Bangor; features Bangor in many of his stories, such as The Langoliers and Storm of the Century; owned the radio stations WKIT, WZON, and WZLO until 2025
- Helen Maud Merrill (pen name, Samantha Spriggins; 1865–1943), litterateur and poet
- Hayford Peirce, Bangor native, science-fiction writer, nephew of Waldo Peirce
- Alexis A. Gilliland, sci-fi author and cartoonist
- Mameve Medwed, novelist
- Don J. Snyder, novelist
- Christina Baker Kline, novelist
- Christopher Willard, novelist
- David Baker, poet
- Susan Lubner, children's book author
- Bruce McMillan, children's book author
- Eugene T. Sawyer, the "prince of dime novelists", was born and raised in Bangor. In a 1902 interview, he claimed to have authored 75 examples of that genre, mostly for the Nick Carter series, once producing a 60,000 word novel in two days. His major innovation was to "begin the plot with the first word", i.e. "We will have the money, or she shall die!"
- Ruel Perley Smith (1869–1937), born in Bangor, author of the Rival Campers series of boys' books in the early 20th century; night and Sunday editor of the New York World newspaper
- Tim Sullivan, science fiction author, born and raised in Bangor
- George Savary Wasson, painter and author of four novels, lived and worked in Bangor in the early 20th century
- Christine Goutiere Weston (1904–1989), author of ten novels, more than thirty short stories, and two non-fiction books (about Ceylon and Afghanistan), born in India and lived the latter part of her life in Bangor

== Civil servants ==
- William Hammatt Davis, of Bangor; brother of playwright Owen Davis; chairman of the War Labor Board under Franklin Roosevelt, where his job was keeping industrial peace between management and labor; appointed U.S. economic stabilizer at the end of the war; helped draft the National Labor Relations Act (the Wagner Act) of 1935, which gave labor unions the right to organize
- Jay Stone, of Bangor; chief clerk of the War Department in the 1920s
- Artemus E. Weatherbee (died 1995), of Bangor; assistant secretary of the treasury (1959–1970) and thereafter U.S. director of the Asian Development Bank with the rank of ambassador

== Clergymen and missionaries ==
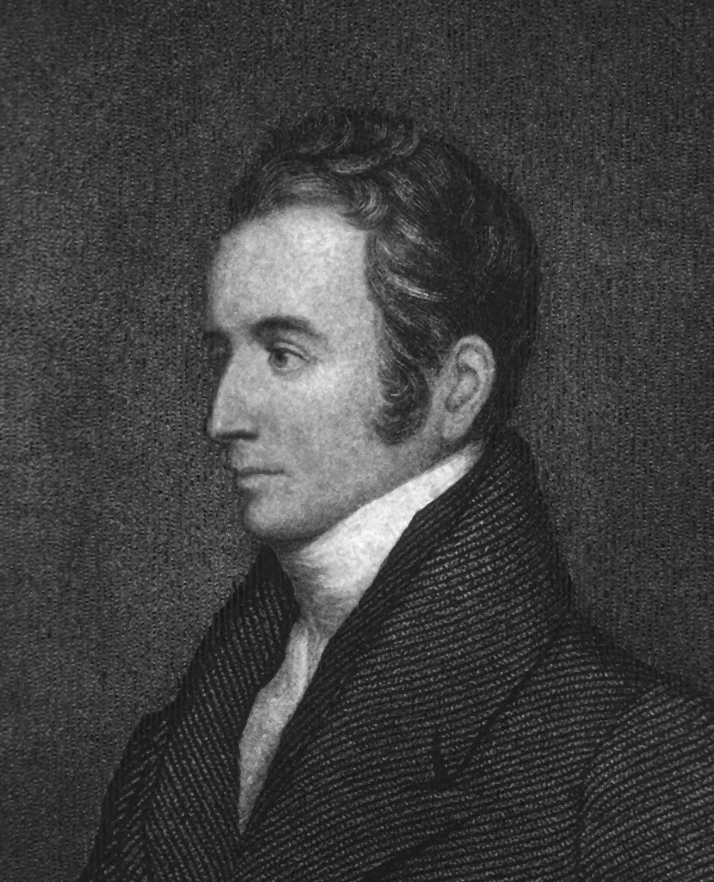
Rev. Jehudi Ashmun, a founder of Liberia

- Jehudi Ashmun, professor and director of the Bangor Theological Seminary which produced a number of influential ministers, missionaries, and scholars in the 19th century;led a group of 32 freed slaves to the American Colonization Society's African colony in Liberia in 1822, and is considered one of the founders of that nation
- John Bapst (1815–1887), Swiss-born member of the Jesuit order, was sent to Old Town, Maine in the late 1840s to minister to the Catholic Penobscot tribe; conducted a roving ministry to 33 Maine towns, oversaw the construction of St. John's Catholic Church in Bangor in 1855; first rector of Boston College; superintendent of the Jesuit order in New York and Canada; died in Baltimore; namesake of John Bapst Memorial High School in Bangor
- Joseph Osgood Barrett (1823–1898), born in Bangor, Universalist minister; became a prominent spiritualist and spirit medium in Illinois and Wisconsin; lecturer and author of books on spiritualism; editor of the Chicago-based newspaper The Spiritual Republic; became known as an advocate of women's rights with the publication of his book Social Freedom; Marriage: As It Is and As It Should Be in 1873
- Dana W. Bartlett, of Bangor; moved to Los Angeles in 1896, founded a settlement house (the Bethlehem Institute) and became a major figure in the local progressive and City Beautiful movements; honoree in the California Social Work Hall of Distinction
- Elisabeth Anthony Dexter, European director of the Unitarian Service Committee during World War II, running a programme in neutral Lisbon, Portugal to assist Jewish refugees from Nazi-occupied Europe
- Daniel Dole (1808–78), graduated from Bangor Theological Seminary, left Bangor in 1839 to establish one of the earliest Protestant missions in Hawaii, and ended up founding a local dynasty
- Charles Carroll Everett, pastor of the Bangor Unitarian Church 1859–69, noted philosopher of religion, dean of the Harvard Divinity School
- Cyrus Hamlin, graduated from Bangor Theological Seminary in 1837; founder and first president of Robert College in Istanbul, Turkey, and later president of Middlebury College (1880–85) in Vermont
- Edward C. O'Leary, born in Bangor, bishop of the Catholic Diocese of Maine in the 1970s–1980s
- Benjamin Franklin Tefft, Methodist minister; president of Genesee College in New York (the nucleus of the later Syracuse University); U.S. consul in Stockholm (1862); acting minister (ambassador) to Sweden

== Defendants and detainees ==
- Prescott Freese Dennett, of Bangor; one of 30 people indicted for sedition and tried in Washington in 1944; stood accused of helping a German agent, George Sylvester Viereck, distribute propaganda designed to keep the U.S. out of the war in Europe; case ended in a mistrial
- Howard E. Penley, of Bangor and Dorchester, Massachusetts, arrested and arraigned in Bangor on Dec. 23, 1943, for refusing to register for the draft; New England district secretary of the Socialist Party of America; was opposed to war on political and religious grounds

== Diplomats ==
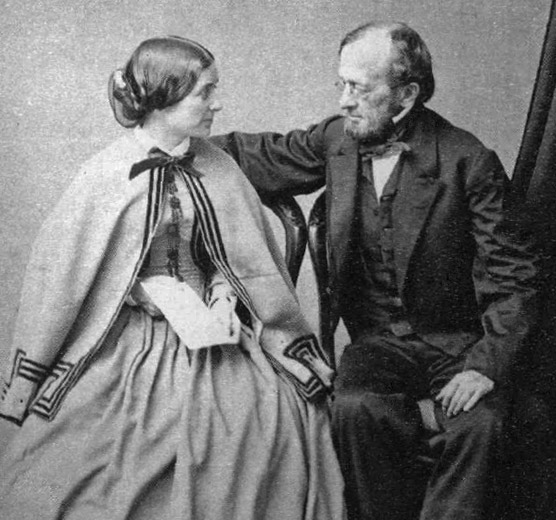
Congressman, diplomat, and Hawaiian government official Elisha Hunt Allen with wife Mary

- Elisha Hunt Allen, Bangor politician; U.S. consul to the Kingdom of Hawaii 1850–1856; joined the Hawaiian government as chancellor and chief justice 1857–1876; ambassador of the Kingdom of Hawaii to the U.S.
- William Fessenden Allen, son of Elisha Hunt Allen, born in Bangor, also served in the government of Hawaii, both before and after the kingdom became an American territory
- Patrick Duddy, of Bangor, U.S. ambassador to Venezuela in the Bush administration; temporarily expelled from the country in 2008 by President Hugo Chávez in a dispute over an alleged American coup plot
- Albert G. Jewett, U.S. chargé d'affaires to Peru (1845–1847)
- Edward Kent, former Maine governor; U.S. consul in Rio de Janeiro 1849–1853
- Wyman Bradbury Seavy Moor, U.S. consul-general to Canada (1857–1861)
- Robert Newbegin II, U.S. ambassador to Honduras (1958) and Haiti (1960–1961)
- Chester E. Norris, U.S. ambassador to Equatorial Guinea (1988–1991)
- Gorham Parks, U.S. Consul in Rio de Janeiro (1845–1849)
- William P. Snow, U.S. ambassador to Burma (1959–1961) and Paraguay (1961–1967)
- Charles Stetson, U.S. ambassador to Bulgaria (1921–1928); Romania (1928), and Yugoslavia (1933)

== Inventors ==
- Melville Sewell Bagley, invented an aperitif named Hesperidina, using the peels of bitter oranges, which became the national liquor of Argentina. It is still produced, with his image on every bottle

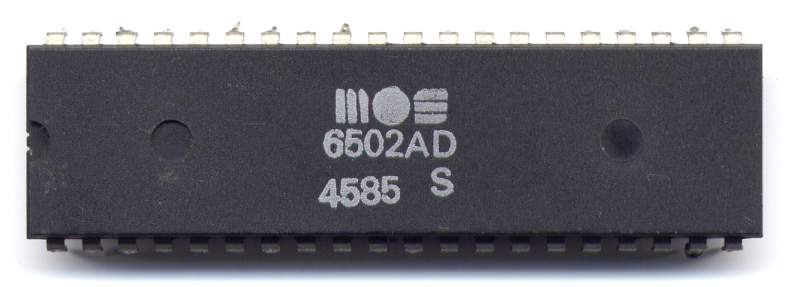
The MOS 6502 Microprocessor, designed by Chuck Peddle in 1975

- Chuck Peddle, who developed the MOS 6502 microprocessor in 1975, was born in Bangor in 1937
- Paul E. Watson, of Bangor, chief engineer of the U.S. Army Signal Corps, headed the team that built the army's first long-range radar in 1936–1937; namesake of the Army's radar laboratory, "Watson Laboratories"

== Journalists ==
- Margherita Arlina Hamm, spent part of her childhood in Bangor, a pioneering female journalist who covered the Sino-Japanese War and Spanish–American War for New York newspapers, sometimes from the front lines; prolific author of popular non-fiction books; a suffragette, nonetheless a defender of American imperialism, chairing the pro-war "Woman's Congress of Patriotism and Independence" and writing an heroic biography of Admiral George Dewey
- Ralph W. 'Bud' Leavitt Jr., longtime columnist and editor for The Bangor Daily News; born in Old Town, Maine; cub reporter at The Bangor Daily Commercial at age 17 in 1934
- Kate Snow, born in Bangor

== Judges ==
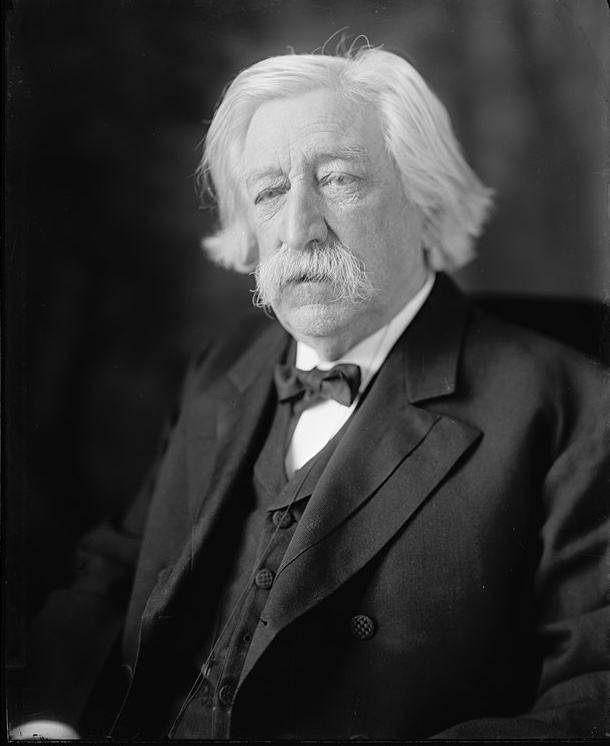
Melville W. Fuller

- Edward Matthew Curran, chief judge of the United States District Court for the District of Columbia (1966–1971); born in Bangor; as a federal judge in 1949 he presided over the treason trial of Mildred Gillars (aka Axis Sally)
- Melville Weston Fuller, chief justice of the U.S. Supreme Court (1888–1910), read law in Bangor with his two uncles after graduating from Bowdoin College in 1853, admitted to the bar in Bangor in 1855
- Edward Kent Jr., son of Bangor Mayor, Maine Governor, and Maine Supreme Judicial Court Justice Edward Kent; appointed by his Harvard classmate Theodore Roosevelt as chief justice of the Arizona Territory Supreme Court, 1902–1912; delivered a landmark ruling on water rights (the Kent Decree of 1910)
- Robert Murray, First District judge and state legislator
- Abraham M. Rudman, justice of the Maine Supreme Judicial Court

== Physicians and nurses ==
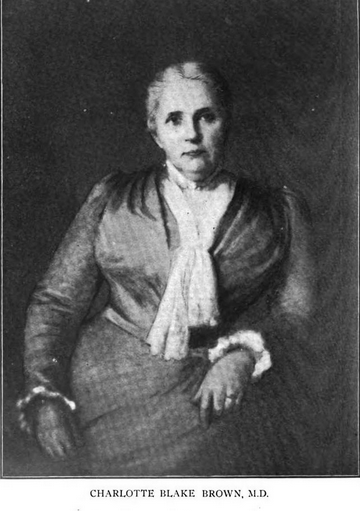
Charlotte Blake Brown

- Charlotte Blake Brown (1846–1904), pioneering female physician who co-founded what became Children's Hospital of San Francisco in 1878, with an all-female staff and board of directors; in 1880 she founded the first nursing school in the American West
- Elliott Carr Cutler (1888–1947), son of a Bangor lumber merchant, became Chairman of the Dept. of Surgery at Harvard Medical School and a pioneer in cardiac surgery, inventing a number of important techniques and publishing over 200 papers. He was elected president of the American Surgical Association, and later became surgeon-in-chief at Brigham Hospital in Boston. During the Second World War he was Chief Surgical Consultant in the European Theatre of Operations with the rank of Brigadier General. Another Bangor-born Harvard Medical School professor, Frederick T. Lord, was a pioneer in the use of serum to treat pneumonia, and was elected President of the American Association of Thoracic Surgery
- Harrison J. Hunt, surgeon on the Crocker Land Expedition to the Arctic in 1913–1917, and the first to return to civilization with news of his fellow explorers, who had been trapped in the ice for four years. Hunt escaped after a grueling four-month dog-sled journey accompanied by six Inuit. He spent the rest of his career working at the Eastern Maine Hospital in Bangor, and authored the book North to the Horizon: Arctic Doctor and Hunter, 1913–1917 (Camden, Me: 1930). He is credited with finding the major biological specimens returned by the expedition—eggs of the red knot, which established its migration pattern between Europe and northern Greenland
- Georgia Nevins (1864–1957), nurse, nurse educator, hospital administrator, American Red Cross leader, born in Bangor
- Mabel Sine Wadsworth (1910–2006), birth control activist

== Scholars ==
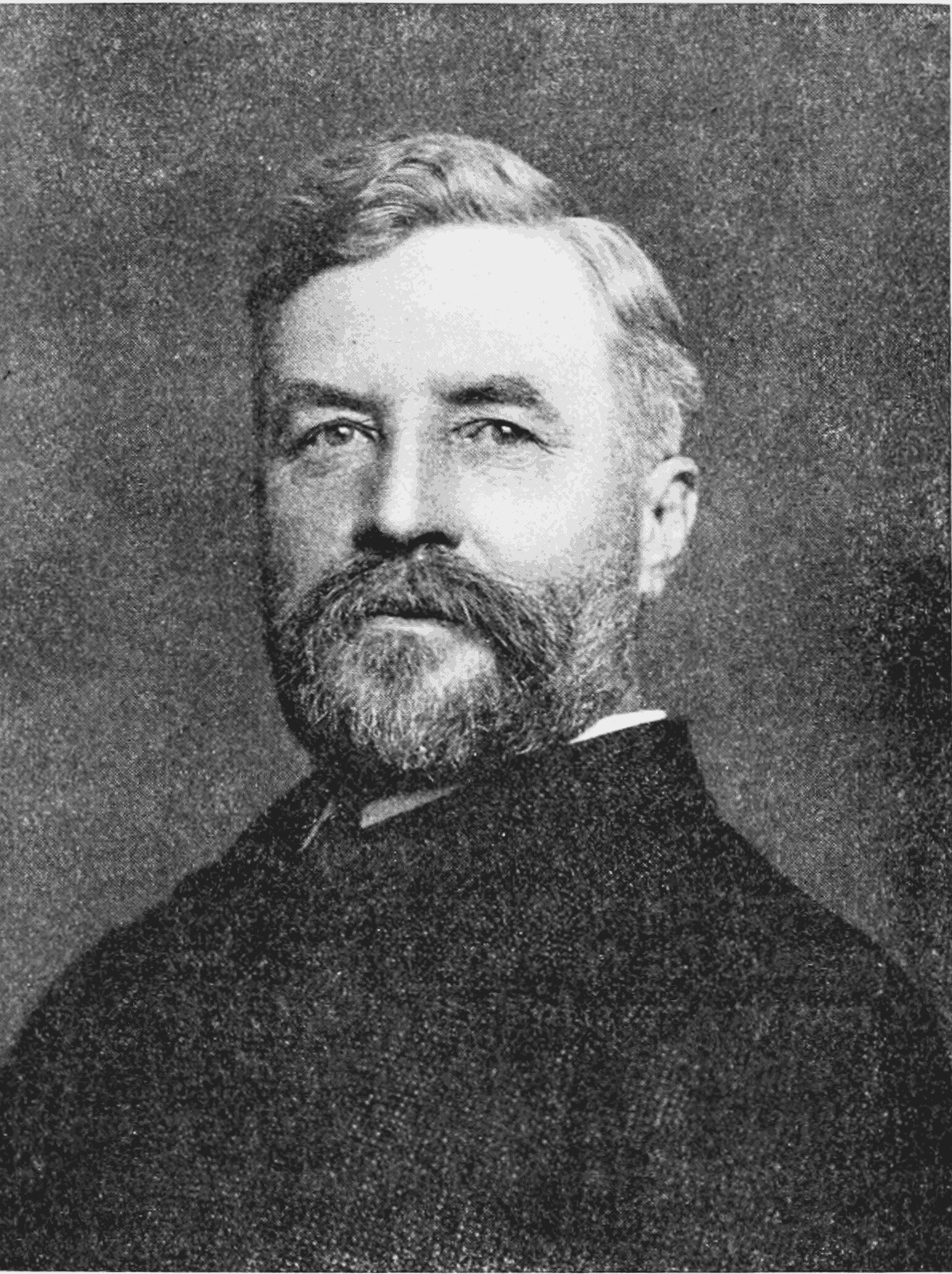
Winfield Scott Chaplin

- Doris Twitchell Allen (1901–2002), University of Maine psychologist; born in nearby Old Town, and practiced at the Bangor Mental Health Institute in the 1970s; founded the Children's International Summer Villages; president of the International Council of Psychologists
- Winfield Scott Chaplin (1847–1918), grew up in Bangor, professor of civil engineering at the Imperial University (now Tokyo University) in Japan; awarded the Imperial Order of Meiji; appointed dean of the Lawrence Scientific School at Harvard, and chancellor of Washington University in St. Louis
- Henry Friedlander (1930–2012), Holocaust survivor and historian of the Holocaust
- Robert Winslow Gordon (1888-1961), first director of the Archives of the American Folk Song at the Library of Congress; in the 1910s–1930s he was arguably the leading authority on this genre of music, personally recorded nearly a thousand folk songs and transcribing the lyrics of 10,000 more
- John Irwin Hutchinson (1867–1935), professor of Mathematics at Cornell University, vice president of the American Mathematical Society
- Ella Boyce Kirk (c. 1861–1930), superintendent of schools in Pittsburgh, one of the first women to hold that office in an American city
- Edith Lesley (1872-1953), founder of Lesley University in Massachusetts; grew up in Bangor
- Sarah Parcak, Bangor-born Egyptologist; of the University of Alabama uses satellite imaging. An earlier archaeologist from Bangor, Henry Williamson Haynes, also did field work in Egypt
- Albion Woodbury Small (1854-1926), "father of American sociology"; attended grade school in Bangor; first American professor of sociology, founder of the first department of sociology (at the University of Chicago), edited the discipline's first American journal, and was president of the American Sociological Society (1912–1913)
- Harris Hawthorne Wilder (1864–1928), zoologist; born in Bangor, pioneer in fingerprint analysis and forensic science
- William D. Williamson (1779-1846), Brown University-educated Bangor lawyer; second governor of Maine; the state's first historian, producing a two-volume History of the State of Maine as early as 1832; it remained the standard reference throughout the 19th century
- Edwin Young (1947-2006), graduated from Bangor High School in 1935; dean of the College of Letters and Science at the University of Wisconsin and president of the University of Maine; economist and expert on international labor relations

== Show business/entertainment ==
- Eugene A. Eberle (1840–1917), Broadway actor; made his debut as Paris in a Bangor production of Romeo and Juliet He played the gravedigger in Edwin Booth's Hamlet in 1864–1865. By the early 1900s he was in the touring company of acclaimed actor Otis Skinner.
- Everett Glass (1891–1966), character actor; was born in Bangor. He appeared in more than eighty films and television shows from the 1940s through the 1960s, including Invasion of the Body Snatchers (1956) and episodes of Superman, Lassie, and Perry Mason.
- Richard Golden (1854–1909), comic stage actor; called by one turn-of-the-century theatre critic "the best character actor in America"; buried at Bangor's Mount Hope Cemetery His wife and partner Dora Wiley, "The Sweet Singer of Maine" was the original prima donna of the Boston Opera Company
- Chris Greeley, featured in 1993 as Cosmopolitan magazine's Bachelor-of-the-Month. As a result, he appeared on multiple TV shows, including ones hosted by John Tesh and Leeza Gibbons, in addition to Carnie Wilson and Sally Jesse Raphael. Greeley also served four terms in the Maine Legislature
- Leonard Horn (1926–1975), directed episodes of 34 prime-time television series and a number of made-for-TV movies between 1959 and 1975, including Mission: Impossible, Mannix, It Takes a Thief, Voyage to the Bottom of the Sea, The Outer Limits, and Lost in Space.
- Bob Marley, comedian; born and raised in Bangor, has appeared on the Late Show with David Letterman, The Tonight Show with Jay Leno, and Late Night with Conan O'Brien as well as Comedy Central and cult film The Boondock Saints
- Wayne Maunder, actor; played George Armstrong Custer in the series Custer on ABC in 1967, and co-starred with Andrew Duggan, James Stacy, and Paul Brinegar on CBS's Lancer western series, was reared in Bangor though born in New Brunswick, Canada
- Stephanie Niznik, actress; of the television series Everwood and the film Star Trek: Insurrection was also reared in Bangor
- Priscilla Presley, actress and businesswoman; went to Mary Snow School during 2nd grade
- Charles Rocket (1949–2005), comedian/actor; cast member on Saturday Night Live, and appeared in more than eighty other television shows and films, including Touched by an Angel, Miami Vice, and Star Trek: Voyager
- Eric Saindon, visual effects supervisor for the films King Kong and Night at the Museum; key member of the visual effects team of I, Robot and The Lord of the Rings trilogy; three-time winner of the Visual Effects Society Award
- Ralph Sipperly (c. 1890–1928), appeared in ten films between 1923 and 1932, most of them silent, including the Academy Award-winning Sunrise: A Song of Two Humans; died in Bangor and is buried at Mount Hope Cemetery
- Gary Thorne, sportscaster; born here and once served as an assistant district attorney in the city

== Singers, musicians and songwriters ==
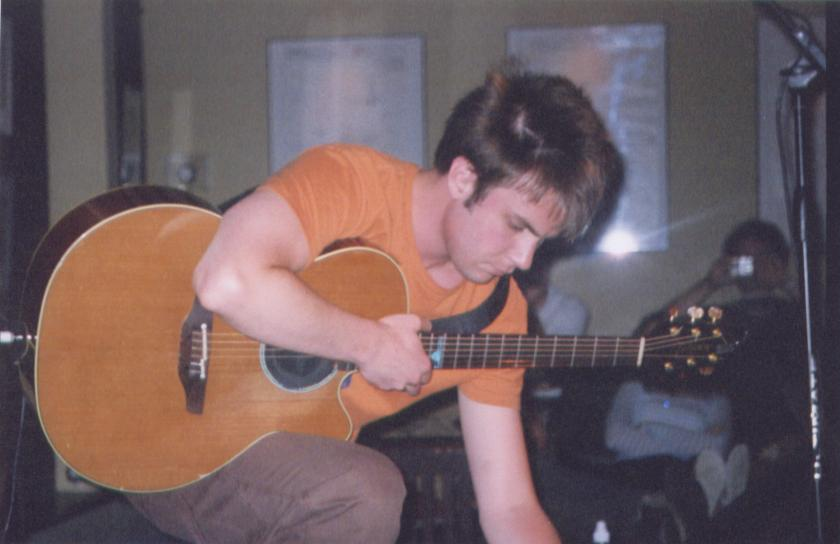
Singer-songwriter Howie Day

- Norman Cazden, celebrated composer (and collector of folk songs); victim of McCarthyism in the 1950s, taught at the nearby University of Maine from 1969 and died in Bangor in 1980
- Dick Curless, country singer; recorded the 1965 hit Tombstone Every Mile, also lived there
- Howie Day, singer-songwriter; recorded the hit "Collide", born in Bangor, and got his start playing local clubs
- Kay Gardner (1941–2002), flutist and pioneering composer of "healing music", lived and died in Bangor
- R. B. Hall, conductor of the Bangor Band, became an internationally famous composer of marches; his "Death or Glory" remains a march classic in the UK and Commonwealth counties
- Courtney LaPlante, lead vocalist of Spiritbox, born in Bangor and lived there until she was 6
- Sarah Robinson-Duff (died 1934), soprano and voice teacher
- George Frederick Root (1820–1895), American Civil War-era composer of songs such as The Battle Cry of Freedom, lived in Bangor before becoming a music publisher in Chicago
- Werner Torkanowsky, Berlin-born; director of the New Orleans Symphony Orchestra, came to Bangor in 1981 to direct the Bangor Symphony and did so until his death in 1992
- Johnny Williams, father of film composer John Williams; lived in Bangor

== Soldiers and sailors ==
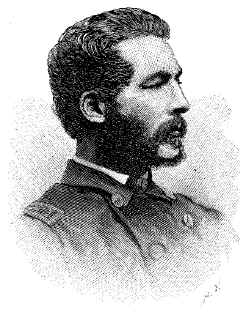
Charles Boutelle

- John F. Appleton, general in the Civil War
- Charles A. Boutelle, Naval lieutenant who accepted the surrender of the Confederate fleet after the Battle of Mobile Bay, where he commanded an ironclad; long-serving U.S. congressman and proponent of American naval power; namesake of Boutelle Avenue in Bangor
- George Adams Bright, rear admiral; surgeon and medical director of the Naval Hospital in Washington, D.C.
- Joshua Chamberlain, major general and hero of the Battle of Gettysburg; accepted the surrender of General Lee's Army at Appomattox; born in the neighboring city of Brewer but studied at the Bangor Theological Seminary; namesake of the bridge connecting the two cities; professor and later president at Bowdoin College; governor of Maine
- Daniel Chaplin, colonel in the Civil War; died in battle, posthumously made a major general
- Charles Hamlin, general in the Civil War; son of Vice President Hannibal Hamlin
- Cyrus Hamlin, general in the Civil War; son of Vice President Hannibal Hamlin
- Edward Hatch, general in the Civil War, commanded the cavalry division of Grant's Army of the Tennessee
- Carl Frederick Holden, vice admiral who began World War II as executive officer of the battleship USS Pennsylvania during the attack on Pearl Harbor;first captain of the battleship USS New Jersey, and ended the war as a rear admiral commanding Cruiser Division Pacific; was on the deck of the USS Missouri to witness the Japanese surrender in 1945
- Molly Kool (1916–2009), first registered female sea captain in North America, spent the last years of her life in Bangor
- Charles W. Roberts, general in the Civil War
- George Foster Shepley, brigadier general; military governor of Louisiana, and later of Richmond, Virginia, the former Confederate capitol
- Thomas Taylor, Bangor sailor, received the Congressional Medal of Honor for bravery in Battle of Mobile Bay; long-serving U.S. congressman and proponent of American naval power; namesake of Boutelle Avenue in Bangor
- Walter F. Ulmer, lieutenant general; former commandant of cadets at West Point and commander of the III Corps and Fort Hood
- George Varney, general in the Civil War
- Daniel White, general in the Civil War
- Donald Norton Yates, lieutenant general; helped select June 6, 1944 as the date for D-Day, the Allied invasion of Europe, in his capacity as chief meteorologist on General Dwight D. Eisenhower's staff; chief meteorologist of the U.S. Air Force; commander of the Air Force Missile Test Center at Patrick Air Force Base in Florida; retired as deputy director of Defence Research and Engineering in the Pentagon
- Elmer P. Yates, major general; early proponent of nuclear power in the U.S. Army Corps of Engineers

== Statesmen ==
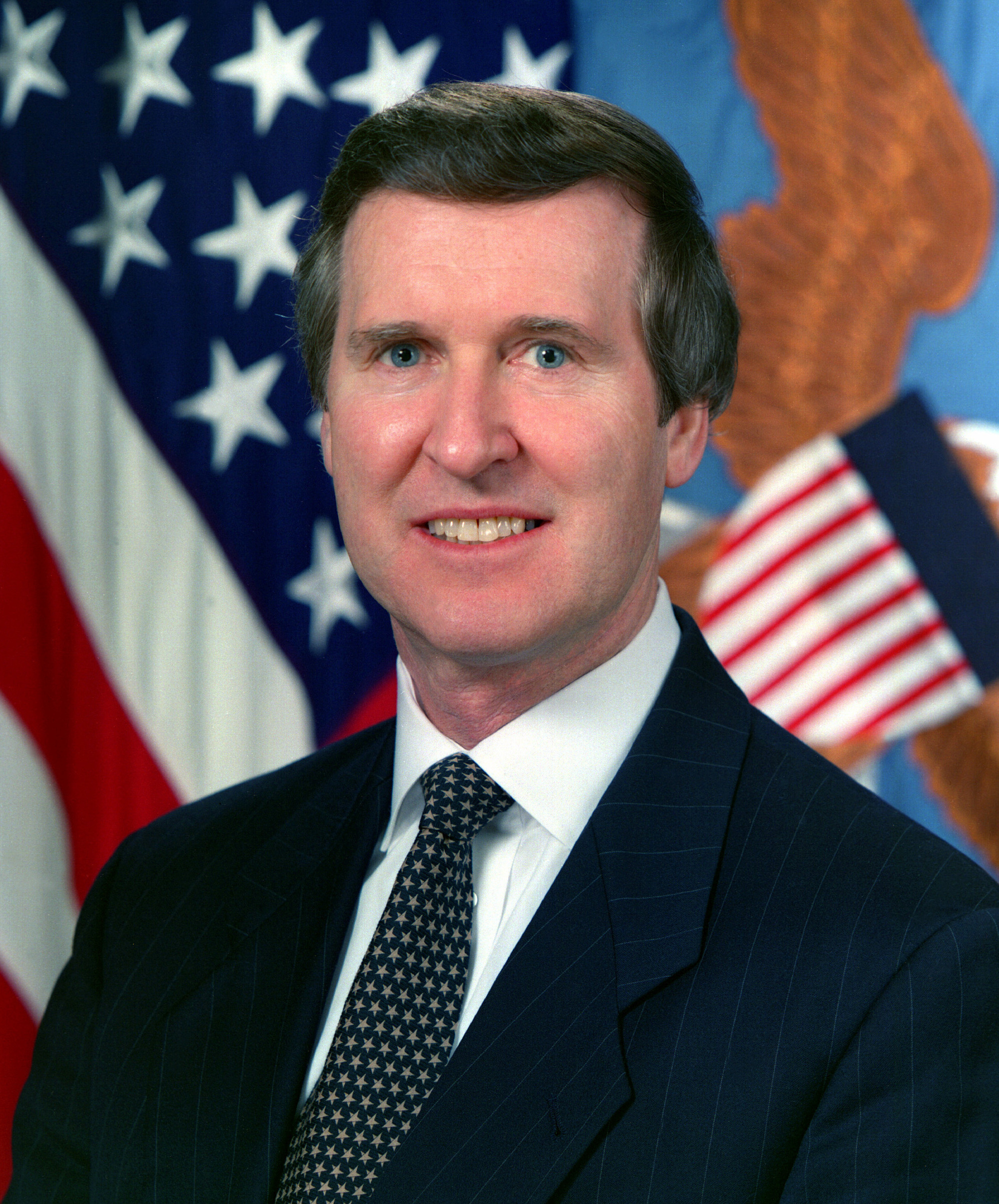
William Cohen

- Elisha Hunt Allen (1841–1843), U.S. congress
- Jack Backman, U.S. congress (Massachusetts)
- John Baldacci (1995–2003), U.S. congress; governor of Maine
- Mark Alton Barwise, only elected member of the Spiritualist religion known to have achieved statewide office in the United States; attorney who served in the Maine House of Representatives, and then the Maine State Senate, 1921–1926; trustee (and senior counsel) of the National Spiritualist Association and curator of its Bureau of Phenomenal Evidence; wrote prolifically on Spiritualism
- David Augustus Boody, U.S. congress (New York, and mayor of Brooklyn)
- Charles A. Boutelle (1882–1901), U.S. congress; chairman of the House Committee on Naval Affairs during the building of the Great White Fleet
- Francis Carr (1812–1813), U.S. congress
- James Carr (1815–1817), U.S. congress
- William Cohen, former U.S. senator and United States secretary of defense under President Bill Clinton, Bangor native, namesake of a local middle school
- Susan Collins, current Republican U.S. senator; lives in Bangor; the state's longest serving member of congress
- Solomon Comstock, U.S. congress (Minnesota)
- Sean Faircloth, five-term state legislator, author and attorney; mayor of Bangor as of 2016; has represented the Richard Dawkins Foundation; executive director of the Secular Coalition for America 2009–2011
- Alpheus Felch, U.S. congress (Michigan)
- Frank Fellows (1941–1951), U.S. congress
- William P. Fessenden, practiced law in Bangor in the early 1830s; Lincoln's secretary of the treasury,
- Loren Fletcher, U.S. congress (Minnesota)
- Hannibal Hamlin, served as Abraham Lincoln's first vice president; strong opponent of slavery; his statue stands in a downtown park, and his house is on the National Register of Historic Places
- Samuel F. Hersey (1873–1875), U.S. congress; willed his estate to the City of Bangor, which used it to found the Bangor Public Library in 1883
- Daniel T. Jewett, U.S. congress (Missouri)
- George W. Ladd (1879–1883), U.S. congress
- Patricia LaMarche, vice presidential candidate of the Green Party in the 2004 election, was raised in Bangor
- John McKernan Jr. (1983–1987), U.S. congress; governor of Maine
- Donald C. McRuer, U.S. congress (California)
- Orrin Larrabee Miller, U.S. congress (Kansas)
- Dorilus Morrison, first mayor of Minneapolis, Bangor lumber merchant in the 1840s Amos Curry became the Reconstruction-era sheriff of Shelby County, Tennessee (Memphis).
- Gorham Parks (1833–1837), U.S. congress
- John A. Peters (1822–1904), U.S. congress
- Harris M. Plaisted (1875–1877), U.S. congress; governor of Maine
- Ambureen Rana, maine state representative
- Donald F. Snow (1929–1933), U.S. congress; sentenced to two years in prison for embezzlement in 1935, but was pardoned a few months later
- Charles Stetson (1849–1851), U.S. congress
- Frederick Stevens, U.S. congress (Minnesota)
- Laura Supica, maine state house
- Abner Taylor, U.S. congress (Illinois)
- Mark Trafton, U.S. congress (Massachusetts)
- Gerald E. Talbot, born in Bangor, first African-American elected to the Maine State Legislature, served 1972–1978
- John G. Utterback (1933–1935), U.S. congress
- William D. Washburn, U.S. congress (Minnesota)
- William D. Williamson (1821–1823), U.S. congress; governor of Maine

== Other ==
- John H. Carkin, Oregon lawyer and politician; born in Bangor
- Holland "Holly" Hanson Coors (1920–2009), beer baroness and political donor; born in Bangor; ex-wife of Joseph Coors, Colorado brewer and founder of the Heritage Foundation; sat on that organization's board of trustees
- Bettina Brown Gorton, wife of Australian Prime Minister Sir John Gorton (served 1968–1971), from Bangor and graduated from Bangor High School
- Abby Fisher Leavitt (1836–1897), social reformer
- Joseph Homan Manley, protege and close associate of presidential candidate James G. Blaine, chairman of the National Executive Committee of the Republican Party in the 1890s, and Maine's "political boss;" born in Bangor
- Sarah Mower Requa (1829–1922), philanthropist and California pioneer; born in Bangor
- Corelli C. W. Simpson (1837–1923), poet, cookbook author, painter; opened the first kindergarten in Bangor
