= Corelli (disambiguation) =

Arcangelo Corelli (1653–1713) was an Italian violinist and composer of Baroque music.

Corelli or Correlli may also refer to:

== People ==
Given name

- Correlli Barnett (1927–2022), historian
- Corelli C. W. Simpson (1837–1923), American poet, cookbook author, painter

Surname

- Corelli (surname)

== Other uses ==
- Correlli, an Australian television series

== See also ==
- Captain Corelli's Mandolin, a novel by British author Louis de Bernières
- Captain Corelli's Mandolin (film), a 2001 film based on the novel
