= Frederick Costello =

Frederick Costello may refer to:

- Frank Costello (footballer) (Frederick G. Costello, 1884–1914), English footballer
- Frederick H. Costello (1851–1921), American author of adventure novels
- Fred Costello (Fredrick W. Costello, born 1950), American dentist and politician
