= Operation Silver City =

1966 action by the US army in South Vietnam

- Part of the Vietnam War
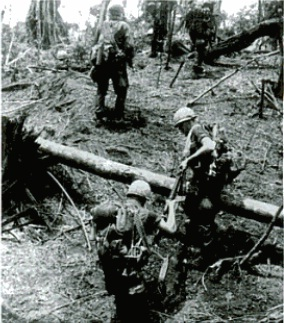
- 173rd Airborne troops patrol along the Sông Bé during the operation
Date	7–23 March 1966
Location	Biên Hòa Province (now in Bình Dương and Bình Phước Provinces, South Vietnam 11.166°N 106.666°E

Belligerents
United States	North Vietnam; Viet Cong

Commanders and leaders
BG Willard Pearson; BG Paul F. Smith; Col. Edgar N. Glotzbach	

Units involved
1st Brigade, 1st Infantry Division; 173rd Airborne Brigade	271st Regiment

Casualties and losses
11 killed 1 helicopter destroyed	353 killed 218 estimated killed

Operation Silver City was an operation conducted by the 1st Brigade, 1st Infantry Division and the 173rd Airborne Brigade in Biên Hòa Province, lasting from 7 to 23 March 1966.

== Prelude ==
Operation Silver City was planned as a sweep of the southwestern sector of War Zone D by the 1st Brigade, 1st Infantry Division and the 173rd Airborne Brigade Combat Team. The goal of the operation was to destroy the headquarters of the B2 Front's Military Region 1, a five-province area east and north of Saigon, and to engage the five major units currently under its command: the People's Army of Vietnam (PAVN) 9th Division's 271st and 273rd Regiments; the Viet Cong 5th Division's 274th and 275th Regiments; and the 308th Main Force Battalion, totaling almost nine thousand soldiers.

== Operation ==
On 7 March the 1st Brigade, commanded by Col. Edgar N. Glotzbach moved southeast of Phước Bình District into the area designated Nevada, while the 173rd, commanded by BGen Paul F. Smith moved to an area east of Sông Bé Province designated Arizona. The units patrolled their designated areas making limited contact with PAVN or VC.

On 14 March Company C, 2nd Battalion, 503rd Infantry Regiment located a well-entrenched enemy force east of Sông Bé. After calling in air and artillery strikes they overran the position, killing nine PAVN/VC. The position was found to be a large field headquarters containing supplies and a hospital and was believed to be the headquarters of the B2 Front Military Region 1.

On 15 March 2/503rd set up its night defensive position 6 km east of Bao Phung. During the night the 271st Regiment surrounded the position. At 07:30 on 16 March the VC shot down a UH-1 helicopter coming in to land on a supply mission, it was unclear if this was intended as a signal for a general attack, but this alerted the defenders and allowed them to man their positions before the VC launched a series of disjointed attacks on the perimeter. As the VC and U.S. forces became intermingled supporting fire could not be used and so instead was aimed at reserve formations. By 10:00 the VC were retreating leaving behind 303 dead and carrying away an estimated 150 dead. U.S. losses were seven killed. Two Battalions were deployed south of the battle site in the hope of blocking escaping forces but made no contact.

The operation continued for another week with minimal contact.

== Aftermath ==
Operation Silver City officially concluded on 23 March, the US claiming that the PAVN/VC losses were 353 killed and a further 218 estimated killed, U.S. losses were 11 killed.
