= Gilden =

Gilden is a surname. Notable people with the surname include:

- Bruce Gilden (born 1946), American photographer
- Katya Alpert Gilden (1914–1991), American writer
- Michael Gilden (1962–2006), American actor
