= Pebley =

Pebley is a surname. Notable people with the surname include:

- Jacob Pebley (born 1993), American backstroke swimmer
- Raegan Pebley (born 1975), American basketball coach and former player

== See also ==
- Penley (surname)
