= Charles Huntington Whitman =

American academic (1873–1937)

- Born: November 24, 1873; Abbot, Maine, U.S.
- Died: December 27, 1937 (aged 64); Highland Park, New Jersey, U.S.
- Education: Colby College, Yale University
- Occupation: College professor
- Years active: 1900–1937
- Employer: Rutgers University (1906–1937)
- Known for: Scholar of early English verse
- Spouse: Rachel Jones Foster (m. 1902)
- Children: 4

Charles Huntington Whitman (November 24, 1873 – December 27, 1937) was the chair of the department of English at Rutgers University for 26 years (1911–1937) and a noted scholar of Edmund Spenser and early English verse.

== Biography ==
Whitman was born in Abbot, Maine, to Nathan Whitman and Helen Augusta Thoms but attended Bangor High School in Bangor, Maine (Class of 1892) before obtaining his B.A. from Colby College in 1897. In 1900, he received a PhD from Yale University for a dissertation on The Birds in Old English Literature. In the same year, he completed a translation of Cynewulf's The Christ, a companion to Yale professor Albert Stanburrough Cook's critical edition of the poem. Whitman went on to take an assistant professorship at Lehigh University. He was invited to Rutgers University in 1906, and accepted the chair of its English department in 1911, a position he maintained until his death. His tenure saw many reforms, most importantly the creation of a graduate program, the doubling in size of the faculty, and a transition from declamation to composition and analysis. At the time of this death he was considered "one of the most popular professors at the university".

Whitman was married to Rachel Jones Foster in 1902, and they had four children: Hilda Trull (born 1908), Alan Foster (born 1909), Dunbar (born 1912), and Esther Huntington (born 1917). He died from a coronary thrombosis on December 27, 1937, at his home in Highland Park, New Jersey.

== Bibliography ==
=== Translations ===
- The Christ of Cynewulf (Ginn and Company, 1900)

=== Reference works ===
- The Birds of Old English Literature (The Journal of Germanic Philology, 1898)
- Old English Mammal Names (The Journal of Germanic Philology, 1907)
- A Subject Index to the Poems of Edmund Spenser (Yale, 1919; Russell & Russell, 1966)

=== Reviews ===
- The Literature of New Jersey (American Historical Society, 1930)

=== Edited volumes ===
- Seven Contemporary Plays (Houghton-Mifflin, 1931; 1959)
- Representative Modern Dramas (Macmillan, 1936)
