= Taunton High School =

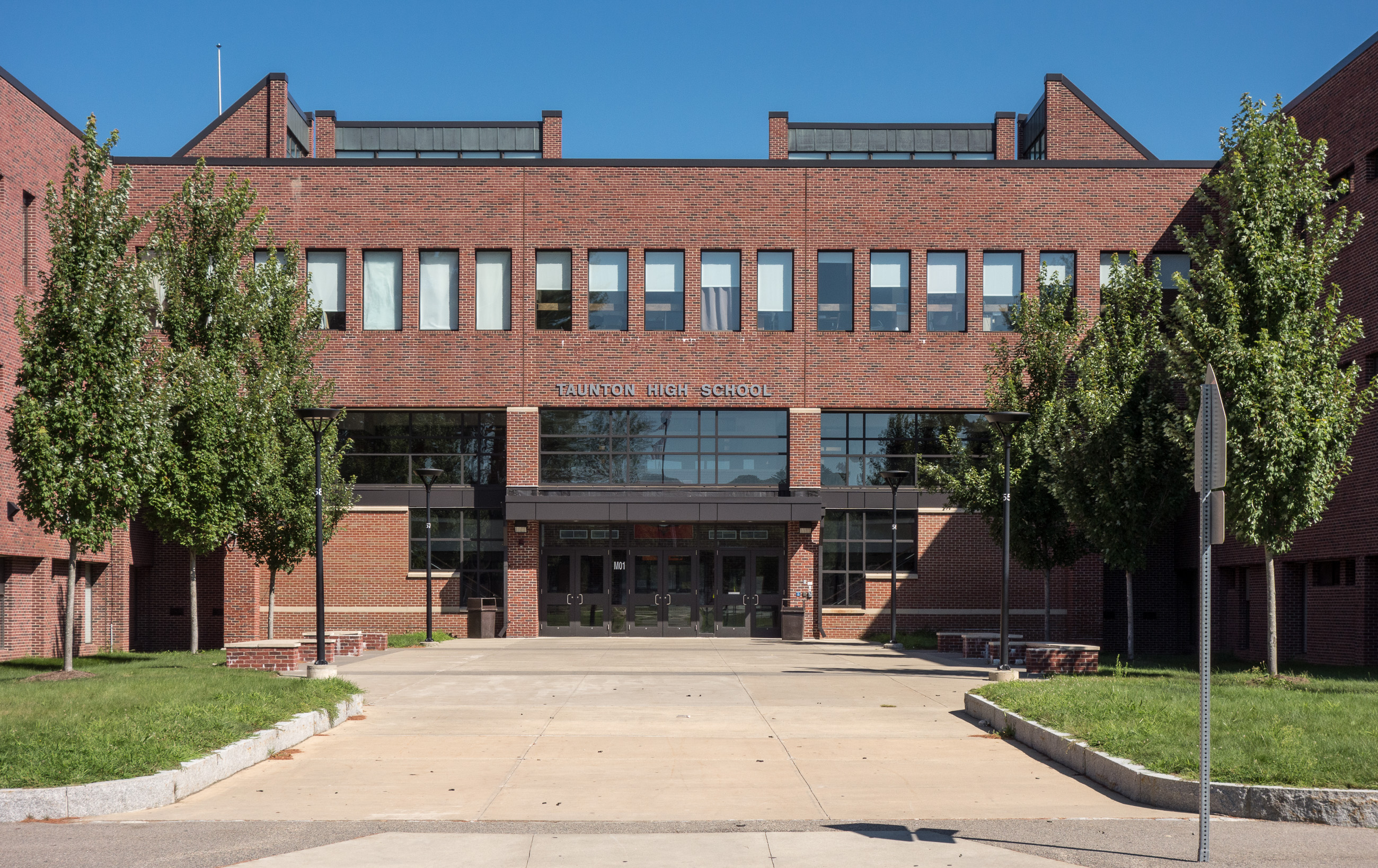

Location
- 50 Williams Street; Taunton, Massachusetts 02780; United States; 41.9015°N 71.0716°W

Information
- School type: Public; Open enrollment
- Opened: 1849
- Status: Open
- School district: Taunton Public Schools
- Superintendent: John Cabral
- Headmaster: John Harrison
- Teaching staff: 171.10 (FTE)
- Grades: 8–12
- Enrollment: 2,960 (2024 - 25)
- Student to teacher ratio: 16.13
- Campus: Urban
- Colors: Black & Orange
- Athletics: MIAA - Division 1
- Athletics conference: Hockomock League
- Nickname: Tigers
- Newspaper: The Tauntonian
- Yearbook: Journal
- Website: THS

Taunton High School (often abbreviated THS) is located within a large, three-floor, interconnected, multi-block complex in the eastern section of Taunton, Massachusetts, United States. It is an urban public high school with an estimated average student enrollment of 3,000 students. It offers many student-oriented services, specialty academic programs, extra-curricular clubs, various after-school programs and a wide array of scholastic sports. Taunton High School is one of the largest high schools in New England, and is the 4th largest in Massachusetts, behind Brockton, Lowell, and New Bedford.

The main section of the building is divided into five different "houses" in which different classes are held, along with an associate headmaster's office in each, and the main headmaster's office in the middle. One of the houses in the main building complex once contained a public middle school, John F. Parker Middle School, until 2009 where, during a total renovation of the entire school, a fifth, exterior wing was added to the front of the school to house the displaced middle school students. Adjacent to school is the fine arts house, Robert H. Park Auditorium, which currently holds seating capacities up to 1,500 people, and beneath that the music rooms, dressing rooms, and storage. The school also shares a two-leveled gymnasium with Parker Middle School, where most of the indoor sports teams perform and a "pep rally" is held in the fall. The school's field house is one of the largest gymnasiums in New England, capable of holding both indoor track meets and basketball tournaments.

== History ==
The requirement for High School level classes in Taunton was established in 1838. The City of Taunton, at that time, did not have a central building in which to hold high school level classes. The local school officials decided to hold high school classes in a neighborhood schoolhouse and rotate each semester to a different location. The first organization of a high school class was held in the District #11 Schoolhouse that later became known as the Woodward School at 52 Worcester Street. The rotation system continued for two years and the state of Massachusetts decided to discontinue the requirement for cities and towns to offer high school classes. From 1840 to 1848, there were no high school classes offered in Taunton. In 1849, Massachusetts, once again, required cities and towns to establish high school classes. The leaders of Taunton decided to hold high school classes in the basement of a church on Spring Street known as the Winslow Church. The classes continued at that location until local officials expanded the interior of the City Hall. The high School classes were moved to the second floor of Taunton City Hall in the mid-1850s and remained there until 1885 when a new High School was built on Washington Street on the site of a popular picnic grounds called 'King's Grove'. The Taunton High School on Washington Street received numerous additions as well as a face lift over the years. The building was in need of replacement and city officials purchased the Baylies estate on Williams Street to construct a new and current Taunton High School complex in 1975.

== 2011 Renovation ==
In 2011 Taunton High School completed a three-year, $93 million renovation by The Design Partnership of Cambridge. The John F. Parker Middle School was removed from the High School and a new wing was constructed that houses the operations of the John F. Parker Middle School.

== Athletics ==
(EMass Division 1, Hockomock League, Kelley-Rex Division) Sports:

- Fall
  - Football
  - Boys/Girls Soccer
  - Field Hockey
  - Cheerleading
  - Girls Volleyball
  - Cross Country
  - Golf
- Winter
  - Boys/Girls Basketball
  - Cheerleading
  - Ice Hockey
  - Boys/Girls Indoor Track & Field
  - Boys/Girls Swimming
  - Wrestling
  - Gymnastics
- Spring
  - Baseball
  - Boys/Girls Outdoor Track & Field
  - Softball
  - Boys/Girls Tennis
  - Boys Volleyball
  - Boys/Girls Lacrosse

== Notable alumni ==
- Randy Costa, Ultimate Fighting Championship mixed martial artist
- Eric DeCosta, National Football League (NFL) general manager
- Paul F. Smith (1915 – 2014), Major General of the United States Army
- Joseph R. N. Maxwell (1899 – 1971), President of Boston College and College of the Holy Cross
- Corelli C. W. Simpson (1837 – 1923), American poet, author, and painter
- Chester I. Reed (1823 – 1873), Justice of the Massachusetts Superior Court and Massachusetts Attorney General

== See also ==
- Bristol-Plymouth Regional Technical School
- Greater Taunton Area
