= Helena Wood Smith =

American painter (1865–1914)

- Born: March 9, 1865; Bangor, Maine, U.S.
- Died: August 1914 (aged 49); Carmel-by-the-Sea, California, U.S.
- Cause of death: Strangulation
- Education: Pratt Institute
- Partner: George Kodani
- Relatives: Ruel Perley Smith (brother)

Helena Wood Smith (March 9, 1865 – August 1914) was an American artist.

== Early life and education ==
Helena Wood Smith was born on March 9, 1865, in Bangor, Maine. She was the sister of novelist, Ruel Perley Smith. Helena attended the Pratt Institute in Brooklyn.

== Career ==
By 1912, she had moved to Carmel-by-the-Sea, California, and was the instructor of "drawing and painting from nature" at the local School of Arts & Crafts. She exhibited at the San Francisco Art Association (1910–1913), Carmel Arts & Crafts Club (1913), and the Hotel Del Monte Art Gallery (1911–13).

Part of her early exhibition history includes the: Boston Art Club (1893–1900), Annuals of the Pennsylvania Academy of Fine Arts (1896–1897), Water Color Club of Washington, D.C. (1902), and Annual of the Art Club of Philadelphia (1900). At the latter, her entry was entitled "Merestead, Gardens of the Pilgrims". Smith was also discussed in Corelli C. W. Simpson's Leaflet of Artists (J.W. Bacon, 1893).

== Personal life ==
In August 1914, she was strangled and buried on the beach by her lover, Japanese art-photographer George Kodani, who was convicted of second degree murder and sentenced to life in prison.
