= Penley (surname) =

Penley is a surname. Notable people with the surname include:

- Aaron Edwin Penley (1806–1870), British painter
- Howard E. Penley, American socialist organizer and official
- W. S. Penley (1851–1912), British actor, singer, and comedian

== See also ==
- Penney
