= Ellen M. Cyr Smith =

American author and education born in Canada

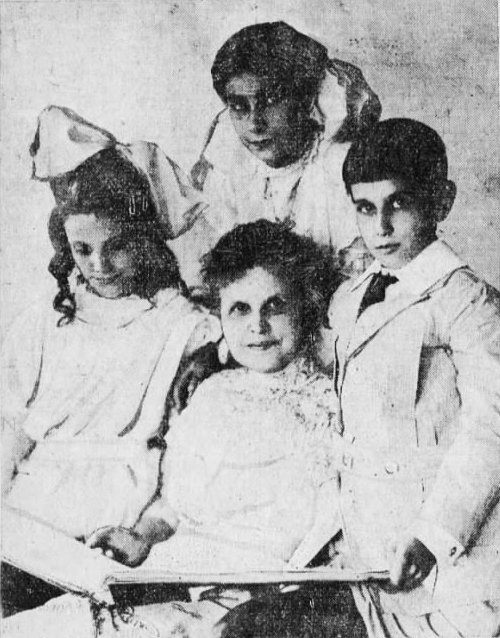
- Ellen Cyr Smith (back) with her children, c. 1911
- Born: Ellen M. Cyr; Montreal, Canada
- Died: New York City
- Occupations: Author, schoolteacher
- Notable work: Cyr Readers

Ellen M. Cyr Smith was an American author and educator born in Canada. She was the author of the Cyr Readers, a series of basal readers that were popular in the 1890s. She is considered the first woman in the United States to widely market and sell a book series under her own name.

== Early life and education ==
Ellen M. Cyr was born in Montreal, Canada. She was the daughter of Ellen S. (née Howard) and Narcisse Cyr, a clergyman and professor of French at Boston University. She had at least four siblings, including a sister named Lucy E. Cyr. Her grandfather was Leland Howard, a reverend from Rutland, Vermont.

She grew up in Vermont and studied in her father's library as a young girl. She later attended school in Newburyport, Massachusetts for her upper grade schooling. Her family eventually moved to Cambridge, Massachusetts, where she graduated from high school.

== Teaching and schoolbook career ==
Smith stayed in Cambridge as a teacher for fifteen years. Around 1880, she taught at the Holmes primary school in town.

While teaching in Cambridge, she organized her own content to use as reading lessons for her students. These later became the basis for her series of primer books. The first of her books was likely the Interstate Primer and First Reader, published in 1886. The publisher Ginn & Company renamed her series of works to Children's Readers around 1891 or 1892. Soon after being published, the Children's Readers series was renamed the Cyr Readers. Her books taught reading through synthetic phonics, by using diacritic marks to allow children to sound out newly introduced words.

The Cyr Readers were revised and reprinted for around 25 years after first being published. The books were used throughout the United States school systems, and were translated into Japanese and Spanish. By 1900, Cyr Readers were used as the primary readers for the first grade in the public school system in New Haven, Connecticut.

Smith created a number of other schoolbooks. Her book Advanced First Reader was published by Ginn & Company and contained engravings by Henry Wolf. She worked on another series for Ginn & Company that began publishing in 1901, called The Cyr Readers Arranged by Grades.

== Personal life and death ==
She married Ruel Perley Smith on June 19, 1896, in Hartford, Connecticut. Together they had at least three children: Eleanor Howard, Edith Cyr, and Reed Stevenson. Ruel worked as an author and was a night city editor of the New York World.

By 1903, Smith lived in Flatbush in New York City.

Smith died at her home in Flatbush on July 25, 1920. Her death occurred after catching influenza, which was followed by multiple months of an unspecified illness. She was buried in Rutland at the Evergreen Cemetery.

== Selected publications ==
- Interstate Primer and First Reader (1886)
- The Children's First Reader (1892)
- The Children's Second Reader (1895)
- The Children's Third Reader (1902)
- Dramatic First Reader (c. 1905)
- Graded Art Readers v. 3 (c. 1906), republished as Story of Three Great Artists (1908)
- The Dramatic Method of Teaching (c. 1912), written by Harriet Finlay-Johnson; edited by Ellen M. Cyr
