= Adam Goode =

American politician (born 1983)

Member of the Maine House of Representatives for the 127th District
- In office December 3, 2008 – December 2016

Personal details
- Born: September 9, 1983 (age 43) Calais, Maine
- Party: Democratic
- Education: University of Maine

Adam A. Goode (born September 9, 1983) is an American politician from Maine. Goode, a Democrat, was elected to the Maine House of Representatives from Bangor's District 15 in November 2008 and re-elected in 2010, 2012 and 2014. Goode is the former chair of the Taxation Committee and the insurance and Financial Services Committee. He is also the Head Boys and Girls Cross Country Coach at Bangor High School, his alma mater. He is pursuing a master's degree in Social Work from the University of Maine. He previously worked as an Environmental Organizer with the Maine People's Alliance and Maine People's Resource Center.
