= Anna Eliza Hardy =

American painter (1839–1934)

- Born: January 26, 1839; Bangor, Maine
- Died: December 15, 1934 (aged 95); Jamaica Plain, Massachusetts
- Parent: Jeremiah Pearson Hardy (Father) Catherine Sears Wheeler Hardy (Mother)

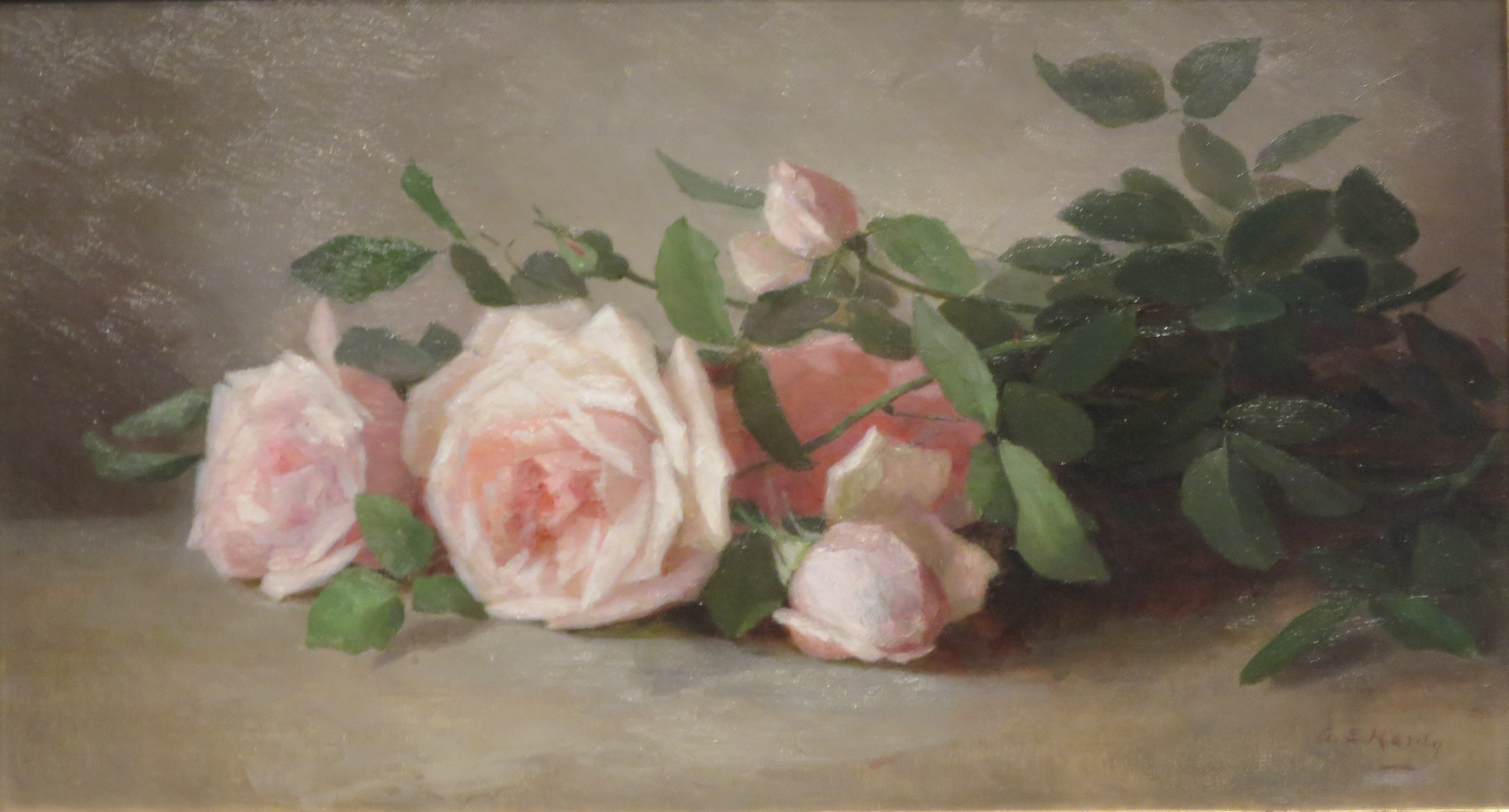
Anna Eliza Hardy- "Still Life of Roses"

Anna Eliza Hardy (January 26, 1839 – December 15, 1934) was a painter prominent in a 19th-century school of painters in Bangor, Maine. She was the daughter and collaborator of Jeremiah Pearson Hardy, himself a prominent portrait painter in Bangor, and Catherine Sears Wheeler Hardy. She was born in Bangor, Maine, the youngest of four children and the only daughter in the family. Hardy died in Jamaica Plain, Mass. after a long painting career.

Hardy was especially known for her floral paintings, of which The Roses is one of the most well-known. Hardy also taught art and guided other female painters, including Charlotte Baldwin, Grace Hemenway, Florence Jennison, Nellie Lincoln, Mary Merrill, Katherine Parker Stewart, and Emma Webb, in the art of florals. She focused her energy mostly on detailed still life paintings, but as her vision began to fail, she started to create less detailed pieces.
