= Galen Cole =

American businessman (1925–2020)

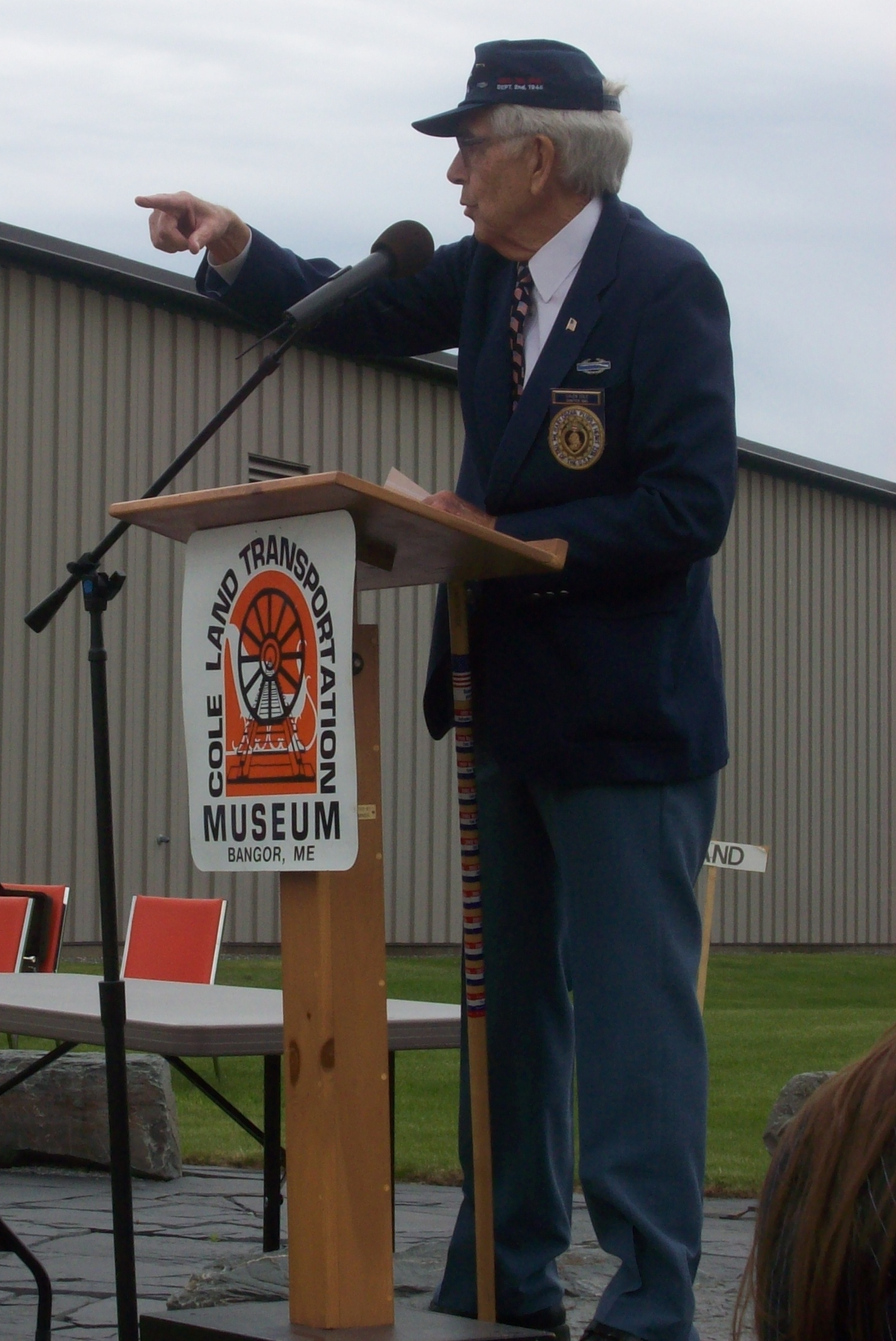
- Cole at the Cole Land Transportation Museum addresses a group of students from Maine School Administrative District 63 in 2007.
- Born: November 29, 1925; Bangor, Maine, U.S.
- Died: January 9, 2020 (aged 94); Bangor, Maine, U.S.
- Education: Bangor High School
- Spouse: Sue Welch Cole
- Parent(s): Albert J. Cole; Amy Stone
- Awards: Purple Heart

Galen Cole (November 29, 1925 – January 9, 2020) was an American World War II veteran and philanthropist. He managed the Cole Land Transportation Museum, the Walking Sticks for Veterans program, and organized numerous activities and charity drives for veterans and related causes in his native Bangor, Maine.

== Background ==
Galen was born in 1925 to Albert J. "Allie" Cole, founder of the Coles Express delivery company, and Amy Stone, a schoolteacher. He was the fifth child of seven born to the couple. From a young age he was interested in trucks and enjoyed spending time with the drivers employed by his father. Galen would accompany drivers as they delivered Sears & Roebuck mail order catalogs to Deer Isle. He described the reactions of the Isle residents upon receiving the catalogs as: “You’d have thought we were the Queen Mary!”

In 1936, his family moved into the former Noyes & Nutter stove foundry in Bangor. His father took a job loading potatoes onto schooners on the Penobscot River.

== World War II ==
Galen entered basic training in 1945, and shortly thereafter received the news that his childhood best friend, Charlie Flanagan, had been killed on the Siegfried Line. He became a replacement in the 5th Armored Division. One day in April, Galen was sitting in the back of a half-track when he was asked to move; he complied. Later, a German shell came through where Galen had been sitting earlier, killing the five men on that side of the half-track and wounding the others. He was discharged in 1946.

== After the War ==
After the war, Galen returned to Maine to be with his wife, Sue Welch Cole, and their five children. At age 29, he became president of Cole Express and joined the Bangor City Council. During his time as the president of Cole Express, he developed a split-compartment truck that allowed petroleum and freight to be transported simultaneously.

He then realized that his father had numerous old trucks and other vehicles that were not being used; he took these vehicles and placed them in the Cole Express facility to display them. Children and teachers began to come to learn about the history of transportation in the state, and so in the '80s Cole purchased a piece of land to create a full-fledged museum. Before construction began, seventy-seven vehicles had been donated. The museum now has close to 200 vehicles.

In 1995, he organized the Bangor Labor Day Parade, in honor of the 50th anniversary of the end of World War II. The parade also included the 50th-anniversary reunion of the 5th Armored Division and the Eastern Maine Medical Center Follies Salute to USO Show. Retired General William Westmoreland served as the parade's grand marshal.

On May 31, 2001, Cole was awarded the Bangor Convention & Visitors Bureau's Eagle Award, an award presented to "individuals or organizations with significant achievements in our area through contributions of time, effort and talents." In 2002, he was awarded a citation by National Americanism Officer Robert Marks from the Military Order of the Purple Heart in recognition of his "devotion to teaching schoolchildren the meaning of freedom and of the sacrifices made by America’s service men and women as well as [his] support of all other programs promoting Americanism to include Scouting and the Military Order of the Purple Heart of the U.S.A. [...] and as an expression of appreciation for [his] years of exceptional service”

== Other programs ==
Cole founded the Walking Sticks for Veterans program in Maine, based on a similar program in Florida. Peavey Manufacturing has made over 8,000 maple walking sticks that are handed out to veterans during parades and at the museum. The sticks can have stickers applied to them that show which wars the veteran was involved with.

The Cole Family Foundation has also provided scholarships to the University of Maine, Reading Recovery programs in local schools, Thermal imaging equipment for local fire departments, and dental assistance for children. Galen Cole also runs the Cole Disaster Relief fund, which offers grants to people and communities affected by natural disasters.

== Bibliography ==
- Janet Mendelsohn (6 June 2011). Maine's Museums: Art, Oddities & Artifacts. Countryman Press. pp. 224–225. ISBN 978-1-58157-879-9.
