= David Richard Porter =

American minister (1882–1973)

David Richard Porter (1882–1973) was a major figure in the Young Men's Christian Association (YMCA) during the height of the organization's popularity and influence on American high school and college campuses. Porter was Executive Secretary of the 'Student YMCA' (the organization's Student Division) from 1915 to 1934, a period when the role of YMCA was expanding beyond bible study groups to embrace community work, a trajectory Porter encouraged.

Born in Old Town, Maine, Porter graduated from Bangor High School in nearby Bangor. He attended Bowdoin College where, according to Time magazine, he "first won fame by catching a Harvard kickoff behind his own goal line, running it back 107 yards for a touchdown.". In 1904, he became the first student from Maine awarded a Rhodes Scholarship, and sailed to Oxford with the original group of American Rhodes scholarship-holders. Porter read history at Trinity College, Oxford, graduating in 1907, and returning to the US to join the executive leadership of YMCA, then a major evangelical association with hundreds of local chapters. Porter served from 1907 to 1915 as Secretary of YMCA's International Committee for Secondary Schools, before taking over the Student Division (which also included the college chapters) in 1915.

Porter also headed the Bible Department at the exclusive Mount Hermon School for Boys in Northfield, Massachusetts, becoming its Headmaster in 1935 when his predecessor, Elliott Speer, was murdered. He remained active in the leadership of YMCA until 1947, and was the author of several books on religion.

Porter died at his home in Abingdon, England, where he had retired. His papers, dealing primarily with his YMCA service, are preserved at the Yale University Library
