= Winfield Scott Chaplin =

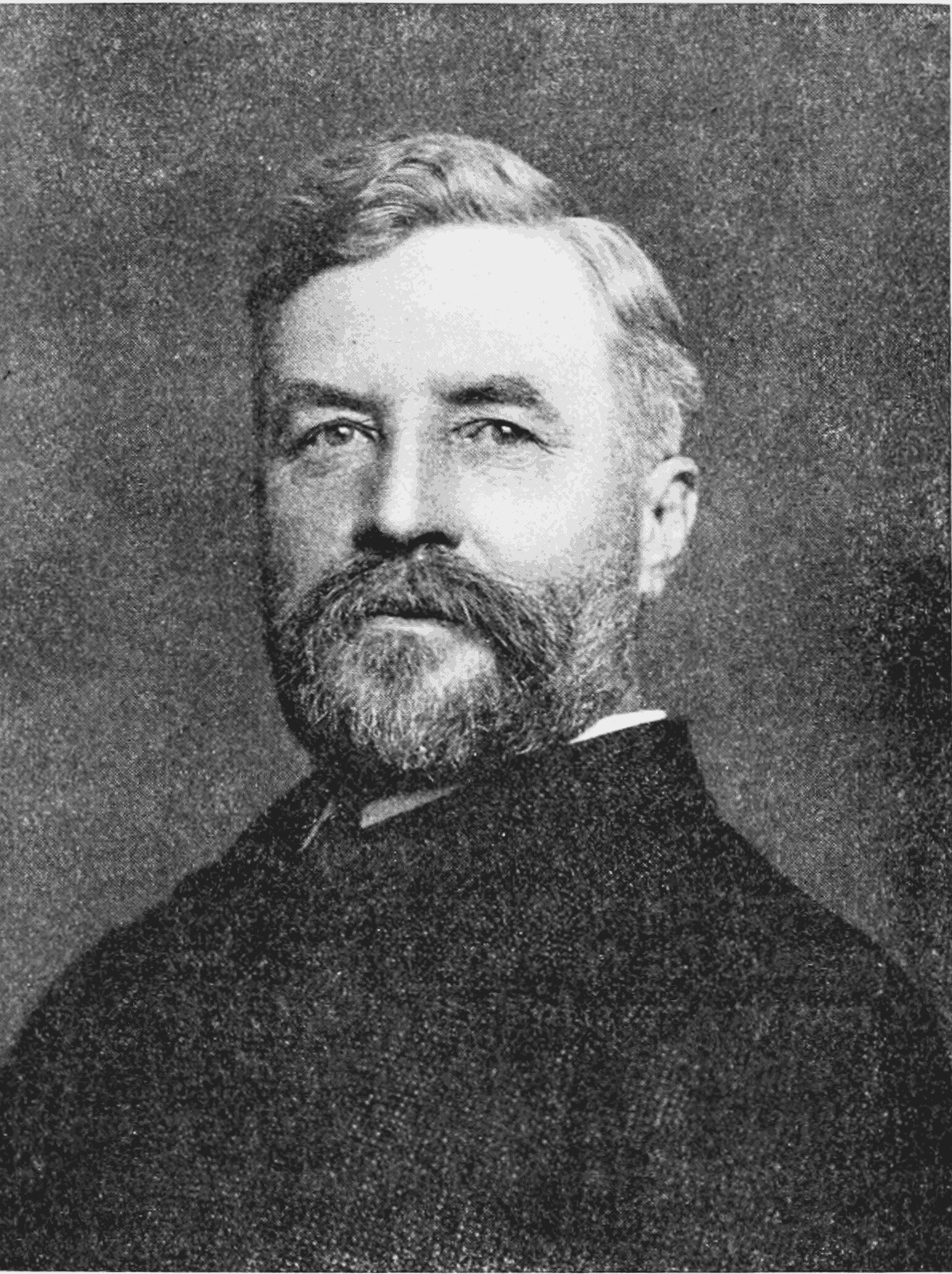
- Winfield Scott Chaplin between 1903 and 1904
- Born: August 22, 1847; Bangor, Maine, U.S.
- Died: March 12, 1918 (aged 70); St. Louis, Missouri, U.S.
- Resting place: Bellefontaine Cemetery
- Education: United States Military Academy

Winfield Scott Chaplin (August 22, 1847 – March 12, 1918) was the chancellor of Washington University in St. Louis from 1891 until 1907.

== Early life ==
Winfield Scott Chaplin was born in Maine in 1847 and graduated from West Point in 1870 as a second lieutenant of artillery. After resigning in 1872, Chaplin held a number of academic positions in civil and mechanical engineering; including Maine State College, Imperial University in Tokyo, Harvard University, and Union College. He served as dean of the Lawrence Scientific School at Harvard for six years before being named Chancellor of Washington University in St. Louis at age 43.

== Washington University in St. Louis ==
During his tenure, Washington University in St. Louis moved from downtown St. Louis to the 103-acre (0.42 km^{2}) Hilltop Campus (now known as the Danforth Campus) on the western edge of Forest Park. The St. Louis Medical College joined the University as did Missouri Dental College. The University awarded its first Ph.D. during Chaplin's administration. He brought key figures onto the board of directors who would have lasting influence on the University, most notably Samuel Cupples, Adolphus Busch, and Robert S. Brookings.

== Later years ==
After 16 years at the University, Chaplin moved to the southwest to lead the American Rio Grande Land and Irrigation Company. He later moved to San Antonio, Texas, where he served as president of the Academy of Science. He returned to St. Louis in 1917 and died the following year.

== Honors ==
Following his years as Professor of Civil Engineering at the University of Tokyo, he was awarded the Imperial Order of Meiji in 1882.
