= Christopher Willard =

American novelist, critic, short story writer and visual artist

Christopher Willard (born 15 September 1960) is an American-born novelist, critic, short story writer and visual artist.

== Life ==
Born in Bangor, Maine, Willard was raised in Vermont. He attended the Portland School of Art, renamed the Maine College of Art, and completed his education at Hunter College. He currently lives in Calgary, Alberta, and teaches at Alberta College of Art and Design.

== Work ==
Willard's art is associated with neo-op art and neo-conceptualism. Willard is also known as a writer, expert in color theory, and critic. His art is held in collections. He is currently an associate professor in the department of painting at Alberta University of the Arts.

Fiction Writing

- Garbage Head. Willard, Christopher. Garbage Head. Véhicule Press/Esplanade Books, 2005.
- Sundre. Willard, Christopher. Sundre. Véhicule Press/Esplanade Books, 2009.

Non-Fiction Writing

- Watercolor Mixing: The 12-Hue Method. Willard, Christopher. Watercolor Mixing: The 12-Hue Method. Rockport Press, 2000.

Poetry Writing

- Ship of Theseus. Willard, Christopher. Ship of Theseus. Crisis Chronicles Press, 2016.

== Awards ==
Garbage Head

- Shortlisted for the Canadian Library Association Young Adult Canadian Book Award, 2006
- Shortlisted for the Expozine Award, 2006
- Selected for Take a Joy Read Canada, 2006
- Longlisted for the ReLit Award, 2006
- Longlisted for the Stephen Leacock Memorial Medal for Humour, 2006

=== References ===
- http://www.vehiculepress.com/titles/393.html
