= Hurry Sundown (film) =

1967 film by Otto Preminger

- Original poster
- Directed by: Otto Preminger
- Written by: Horton Foote; Thomas C. Ryan
- Based on: Hurry Sundown; 1965 novel by K.B. Gilden
- Produced by: Otto Preminger
- Starring: Michael Caine; Jane Fonda; John Phillip Law; Diahann Carroll; Robert Hooks; Faye Dunaway; Burgess Meredith; Robert Reed; George Kennedy; Frank Converse; Loring Smith; Beah Richards; Madeleine Sherwood; Rex Ingram; Steve Sanders; John Mark; Doro Merande; Luke Askew; Donna Danton; Jim Backus
- Cinematography: Loyal Griggs; Milton R. Krasner
- Edited by: Louis R. Loeffler; Tony de Zarraga; James D. Wells
- Music by: Hugo Montenegro
- Distributed by: Paramount Pictures
- Release date: February 9, 1967
- Running time: 146 minutes
- Country: United States
- Language: English
- Budget: $3,785,000
- Box office: $4,050,000 (rentals) (US/Canada)

Hurry Sundown is a 1967 American drama film produced and directed by Otto Preminger, and starring Jane Fonda and Michael Caine. The screenplay by Horton Foote and Thomas C. Ryan is based on the 1965 novel of the same title by K.B. Gilden, a pseudonym for the married couple Katya and Bert Gilden. It marked Faye Dunaway's film debut. The film is considered a Southern Gothic work.

== Plot ==
In 1946, bigoted, draft-dodging, gold-digging Henry Warren and his heiress, land-owning wife Julie Ann, are determined to sell their land in rural Georgia to owners of a northern canning plant, but the deal rests on selling two adjoining plots as well, one owned by Henry's cousin Rad McDowell and his wife Lou, the other by black farmer Reeve Scott, whose ailing mother Rose had been Julie's wet nurse. Neither farmer is interested in selling his land, and they form a dangerous and controversial black and white partnership to strengthen their legal claim to their land, which infuriates Henry.

When Rose suddenly dies, Henry tries to persuade his wife to charge Reeve with illegal ownership of his property, but local black teacher Vivian Thurlow searches the town's records and uncovers proof that Reeve legally registered the deed to his land. Julie, upset with Henry's treatment of their mentally challenged young son, decides to leave him and drops her suit against Reeve.

With the help of Ku Klux Klansmen, Henry dynamites the levee above the farms, and Rad's oldest child drowns in the ensuing flood, much to Henry's dismay. Rather than admit defeat, Rad and Reeve decide to rebuild their devastated properties with the assistance of their neighbors.

== Cast ==
- Michael Caine as Henry Warren
- Jane Fonda as Julie Ann Warren
- Diahann Carroll as Vivian Thurlow
- Beah Richards as Rose Scott
- Robert Hooks as Reeve Scott
- Faye Dunaway as Lou McDowell
- John Phillip Law as Rad McDowell
- Luke Askew as Dolph Higginson
- George Kennedy as Sheriff Coombs
- Burgess Meredith as Judge Purcell
- Madeleine Sherwood as Eula Purcell
- Frank Converse as Reverend Clem De Lavery
- Robert Reed as Lars Finchley
- Jim Backus as Carter Sillens

== Production ==
Otto Preminger was shown the galley proof of the 1,046-page Gilden manuscript by his brother Ingo and, fully expecting it to be another Gone with the Wind, purchased the film rights to the novel for $100,000 eight months prior to its publication. He initially intended to adapt it for a four-and-a-half-hour epic film that would be shown twice-a-day at what would be the highest price scale in the history of American film exhibition, with a top admission of $25 on Friday and Saturday nights. When the book sold a mere 300,000 copies, Preminger decided a less grandiose project might be in order.

Because he admired his screenplay for the Harper Lee novel To Kill a Mockingbird, Preminger hired Horton Foote to adapt the Gilden book, which the author thought was "embarrassing," with "no genuine Southern flavor at all." His first instinct was to decline the offer, but he then decided he could do something with it, so Preminger installed him and his family in a house in London, where the director was filming Bunny Lake Is Missing. Foote completed his draft in three months, but Preminger was unhappy with it, feeling it was missing the melodrama and theatricality the story required. He paid Foote his full fee and dismissed him, although he later insisted on giving the writer screen credit, which Foote accepted (in later years, he admitted he never saw the film and never included it on his résumé). Preminger replaced Foote with Thomas C. Ryan, who worked for him as his chief reader and was familiar with the type of material his employer found appealing.

Preminger wanted to shoot the entire film in Georgia, and in November and December 1965 he visited the state to scout locations, but a union dispute changed his plans. Because the filming would be done during the oppressively hot and humid months of June through August, he planned to shoot at night as much as possible. The New York union, which had jurisdiction over Georgia, demanded crews be paid double for any filming after 4:00 pm, an added expense Preminger knew would be prohibitive. Production designer Gene Callahan suggested his home state of Louisiana might be a viable alternative, since the unions there were governed by the more liberal one in Chicago. Baton Rouge and its environs were selected, and Callahan's crew began planting cornfields, erecting shanties, and constructing a dam and reservoir containing 17.5 million gallons of water.

From the start, Preminger and his cast and crew encountered strong resistance from the locals, who resented having a film featuring a biracial friendship made in their midst and were prejudiced against the film's black crew members and cast. Tires were slashed, some actors received telephoned death threats, and a burning cross appeared on one of the sets at 3:00 am. The manager of the hotel where everyone was housed, the Bellemont Motor Hotel, advised Preminger mixed bathing would not be permitted in the swimming pools, but grudgingly agreed to designate one "interracial" when the director threatened to vacate the premises and not pay the bill. At one point a "crude bomb" was thrown into the desegregated pool, but no one was injured as it happened late at night. Eventually armed state troopers were called in to guard the hotel wing where everyone was staying, making them feel as if they were under house arrest. Problems were encountered even in New Orleans, when Michael Caine tried to show Bobby Hooks an all-black revue Caine had seen, only for Hooks to be refused admission. Matters came to a head when a convoy of cars and trucks returning to the hotel through a heavily wooded area one evening became the target of a volley of sniper gunfire. Robert Hooks later recalled, "All of us were convinced that we were surrounded by some of the dumbest and meanest people on the face of the earth, to say nothing of being the most cowardly."

Midway through filming, Preminger had to replace cinematographer Loyal Griggs with Milton R. Krasner when Griggs seriously injured his back. He later banned screenwriter Ryan from the set for talking to Rex Reed for an article published in The New York Times. In it Reed characterized the director as an autocrat who was losing his grip, quoted Michael Caine as saying, "He's only happy when everybody else is miserable," and claimed Griggs had been fired by Preminger "in a moment of uncontrolled fury." Griggs demanded and received a retraction from the Times.

Preminger greatly regretted casting Faye Dunaway, whose first film role it was, and with whom he clashed on a regular basis. She felt the director didn't know "anything at all about the process of acting." She resented having him yell at her in public and commented, "Once I've been crossed, I'm not very conciliatory." After filming was completed, she sued Preminger to win her release from the five-film contract she had signed with him. An out-of-court settlement was reached in March 1968. Dunaway later admitted, "It cost me a lot of money to not work for Otto again . . . I regretted paying him [but] I thought he was awful."

=== Locations ===
Hurry Sundown was shot on several locations in Louisiana, over a period of ten weeks, from early June to the middle of August. The mansion scenes were shot at the Goodwood Plantation mansion in Baton Rouge. The flood scene was shot on part of the Louisiana State Penitentiary for Women in St. Gabriel. Other locations included St. Francisville and Grace Memorial Episcopal Church in Hammond.

== Critical reception ==
The movie opened to strongly unfavorable reviews from those who felt that Preminger was out of tune with the problems of the contemporary South. It was also criticized for its out-of-date racial stereotyping and tasteless attitude toward sexuality.

Roger Ebert of the Chicago Sun-Times called the film "a frustrating case, not good but not particularly bad, with a smokescreen of controversy surrounding it and obscuring its real faults. The trouble with this film . . . is not that it's racist and tasteless, but that it's naive and dull."

Bosley Crowther of The New York Times described the film as "pure pulp fiction" and "an offense to intelligence."

Time observed "Obviously, Hurry Sundown was intended as a paean to racial justice, but Producer-Director Otto Preminger chooses strange ways to display his big brotherhood. One sequence shows Negro sharecroppers singing a white-eyed hallelujah number reminiscent of those '40s films that pretended to liberalize but patently patronized. Two hours of such cinematic clichés make the viewer intolerant of everyone in the film, regardless of race, creed or color."

Variety wrote that "Otto Preminger has created an outstanding, tasteful but hard-hitting, and handsomely-produced film . . . Told with a depth and frankness, the story develops its theme in a welcome, straight-forward way that is neither propaganda nor mere exploitation material."

Time Out London wrote that "The Preminger flair which made The Cardinal so enjoyable, despite its hackneyed script, seems to have deserted him in this lumbering melodrama, put together with the sort of crudely opportunistic style which alternates scenes of the rich folks parading in a stately mansion with shots of the poor sitting down to their humble fare while thumping mood music makes sure you get the point."

Channel 4 noted "Preminger wears a liberal heart on his sleeve and then blows his nose on it as heavy-handed sentimentality and nobility dominate this story . . . God, sex, class, guilt, moralising and Negro spirituals are all thrown into the stew, and you'll come away feeling that although it's worthy in its ideals, it could have done with a touch less overblown melodrama."

The Legion of Decency gave the film a "C", "Condemned" rating, citing its "superficial and patronizing in its treatment of racial attitudes and tensions" and also its "frequently prurient and demeaning ... approach to sex".

== Awards and nominations ==
Award	Category	Nominee(s)	Result
British Academy Film Awards	Most Promising Newcomer to Leading Film Roles	Faye Dunaway (also for Bonnie and Clyde)	Won
Golden Globe Awards	Most Promising Newcomer – Female	Faye Dunaway	Nominated
Laurel Awards	Top Female Dramatic Performance	Jane Fonda	Nominated

The film was also featured in the 1978 book, The Fifty Worst Films of All Time (and How They Got That Way) by Harry Medved and Randy Dreyfuss.

== Home media ==
Hurry Sundown was released to DVD by Olive Films (under license from Paramount) on May 17, 2011, and the Blu-ray was released on December 23, 2014, and also on November 13, 2012, as a part of the 3-disc Blu-ray box set, The Otto Preminger Collection, with Hurry Sundown as disc one of the set.

== See also ==
- List of American films of 1967

== Bibliography ==
- Dunaway, Faye; Sharkey, Betsy (1998). Looking for Gatsby. New York: Simon & Schuster. ISBN 0-671-67526-5.
- Hirsch, Foster (2007). Otto Preminger: The Man Who Would Be King. New York: Alfred A. Knopf. ISBN 978-0-375-41373-5.
- Medved, Harry; Dreyfuss, Randy (1978). The Fifty Worst Films of All Time (and How They Got That Way). Popular Library. ISBN 978-0445041394.
