= Bangor High School (Maine) =

Location
- 885 Broadway; Bangor, Maine 04401; United States; 44.8315°N 68.7817°W

Information
- School type: Public, high school
- Founded: 1800s
- Oversight: Bangor School System
- Superintendent: Dr. Marie Robinson
- Principal: Richard Fournier
- Staff: 81.30 (FTE)
- Grades: 9–12
- Enrollment: 1,074 (2023-2024)
- Student to teacher ratio: 13.21
- Language: English
- Campus: Urban
- Colors: Cardinal and white
- Mascot: Sam the Ram
- Team name: Rams
- Newspaper: Bangor RamPage
- Yearbook: The Oracle
- Feeder schools: William S. Cohen School; James F. Doughty School
- Website: bangorhigh.bangorschools.net

Bangor High School, a member of the Bangor School System, is a high school in Bangor, Maine, United States. It has an enrollment of approximately 1,030 students in grades 9–12.

It is Bangor's only public high school.

Since its 2001–2002 selection as a National Blue Ribbon School of Excellence by the U.S. Department of Education Bangor High School has consistently been recognized for the achievements of its students. For four years from 2012–2016, the school was named a National Silver Award winner by U.S. News & World Report's "America's Best High Schools. In 2013, BHS was the only urban school among the state's 133 high schools to earn this designation.

BHS consistently ranks among the top five Maine schools in annual rankings of America's Most Challenging Schools published by the Washington Post and journalist Jay Matthews. To determine its rankings, the Post considers the degree to which disadvantaged students outperform their state peers coupled with percentage of most recent graduates having earned a score of 3 or higher (out of 5 maximum points) on one or more Advanced Placement exams. In 2014, the Post analysis placed Bangor High in the top 8% nationally (of approx. 22,000 'normal-enrollment' public high schools), and Bangor was one of only six Maine high schools to make the top 10%, and one of only two in a Maine city. In 2011, Maine's male and female AP Scholars were students at Bangor High School. In 2016, a Bangor High School senior earned the AP International Diploma for having achieved scores of 3 or higher on three or more AP exams in each of three content areas. In 2014, the College Board recognized Bangor as one of 547 US / Canadian District Honor Roll designees, a critical element in the district's selection by the College Board to serve on its national steering committee for its revision of the SAT and the PSAT.

== History ==
Bangor's first public high school (for boys only) was founded in 1835, followed by a school for girls in 1838. These were consolidated as Bangor High School in 1864. The first principal was Robert P Bucknam, a graduate of Wesleyan University.

In the late nineteenth century, Bangor High School was located on Abbott Square, across from the present Bangor Public Library. Designed by architect Wilfred E. Mansur, this building burned down in the Great Fire of 1911. Its steel-framed, yellow-brick replacement was built in 1913 on Harlow Street, just across from its earlier location, from designs by the Boston architects Peabody and Stearns, who also designed the new Bangor Public Library next door. The high school moved into its present building on outer Broadway, designed by architect Eaton W. Tarbell, in 1964.

== Curriculum ==
In 2022 there were plans for a class on the history of the Wabanaki people and the Mi'kmaq language.

== Sports ==
Bangor High School is known for its athletic teams and earned its 100th team state championship in 2016. In that year, Bangor won its third consecutive Class A Baseball title. A source of great pride is the precise arrangement of its state championship banners, which hang on the back wall of the school's Red Barry Gymnasium. Five soccer state championships (three boys, two girls) as well as a 2013 sweep of girls track (indoor and outdoor) are among recent highlights. In 2009, The Varsity Football Team went 11-1 and the Rams won the Eastern Maine Championship. In 2007, Bangor High School earned state championships (Class A) in boys soccer, boys basketball, boys indoor track, boys swimming and diving, girls swimming and diving, and boys outdoor track. Fall sports at Bangor include football (varsity, freshman), cheerleading (V, JV), soccer (V, JV, F), field hockey (V, JV), cross country, and golf. In 2011 The Varsity Girls Soccer Team won their first ever State Championship in school history. Winter sports include basketball (V, JV, F), pickleball (intramural), cheerleading (V, JV), volleyball (intramural), ice hockey (V, JV), indoor track, swimming and diving, and skiing. Spring sports include baseball, (State Champions 2006, 2014, 2015, 2016) (V, JV), softball (V, JV, F), outdoor track, and tennis.

Bangor High School's highest-achieving sport is its Boys Varsity Swim Team. The Swim Team has won 27 State Championships and 1 New England Championships. In 2012, the Boys Swim team went undefeated and maintained a 6-year State Championship winning streak. Coach Phil Emery has led the team to 26 of its State titles and the New England title

in the 2018-2019 varsity basketball season Bangor high school won the state championships.

== Activities ==
Bangor High offers a variety of activities. The speech and debate teams win various competitions across the state during the year and send students to nationals annually. In June 2015, Bangor High School junior Nick Danby won the National Speech and Debate Association Grand Tournament for Congressional Debate in Dallas, Texas. Danby was the first junior in the country to win, and the first person from Maine to exceed tenth place. Bangor has a large number of juniors and seniors in its chapter of the National Honor Society.

== Miscellaneous ==
Peakes Auditorium is used by many groups around the city and state. Most notably, the Bangor Symphony Orchestra held concerts there while the University of Maine's Collins Center for the Arts was being renovated. Graduation exercises for Beal College also use the Peakes Auditorium.

The school year runs from September to June. School days are 8:00 to 2:00. The day is split up into sixteen 'mods', or 20-minute blocks of time. There are five minutes between each class, and each class takes up 2 mods. Lab sciences take up 3 mods 2, 3, or 5 days a week, depending on the difficulty of the class.

The school utilizes locally developed assessments to document student proficiency in Maine learning standards.

Although Bangor takes students from communities lacking a high school, about 2/3 of the students come from Bangor's two public middle schools: the William S. Cohen School and the James F. Doughty School, each of which enrolls approximately 500 students.

== Notable alumni ==
- John F. Appleton - Civil War general
- Taber D. Bailey - lawyer and politician
- John Baldacci - politician
- William Cohen - politician and U.S. Secretary of Defense
- Galen Cole - military veteran and philanthropist
- Marcus Davis - mixed martial arts fighter
- William Hammatt Davis - former chairman of the National War Labor Board
- Prescott Freese Dennett - one of 30 people indicted for sedition for sympathizing with the Axis powers
- Henry Payson Dowst - novelist and short story writer
- Fannie Hardy Eckstorm - writer, ornithologist and folklorist
- Ashley Emerson - soprano
- Keith Farnham - politician who pleaded guilty to distributing child pornography
- John F. Godfrey - sailor, soldier, and officer
- Adam Goode - politician
- Bettina Gorton - academic and former Spouse of the Prime Minister of Australia
- Carl Frederick Holden - vice admiral
- Blanche Willis Howard - novelist
- Chris Johnson - politician
- Matt Kinney - baseball player
- Riley Masters - professional runner
- Wayne Maunder - actor
- David Richard Porter - former major figure in the YMCA
- Gerald Talbot - politician
- Artemus E. Weatherbee - Assistant Secretary of the Treasury
- Cary Weston - politician
- Charles Huntington Whitman - academic
- Donald Norton Yates - Air Force general
- Elmer P. Yates - Army general
- H. Edwin Young - former chancellor at the University of Wisconsin–Madison
