= George Adams Bright =

American admiral and surgeon

- Born: 9 April 1837; Bangor, Maine
- Died: March 12, 1905 (aged 67); Washington, D.C.
- Education: Harvard Medical School
- Military career
- Allegiance: United States Navy
- Service years: 1861–1899
- Rank: Rear admiral
- Conflicts: American Civil War

Rear Admiral George Adams Bright (9 April 1837–12 March 1905) was a United States Navy officer and surgeon. Having served through the American Civil War, he went on to become Medical Director of the US Navy and head of the Naval Hospital in Washington, D.C.

== Military career ==
George Adams Bright was born on 9 April 1837 in Bangor, Maine. He graduated from Harvard Medical School in 1858, and joined the United States Navy on 15 May 1861, being appointed an acting assistant surgeon at Boston Navy Yard. With the American Civil War underway, he was then appointed to serve on board the USS South Carolina. Initially serving in the Gulf Blockading Squadron, South Carolina later moved to the North Atlantic Blockading Squadron. Bright returned to Maine in May 1864, and was promoted to assistant surgeon on 8 August for service at Philadelphia Navy Yard and on the USS New Ironsides. With Ironsides Bright returned to the North Atlantic Blockading Squadron, continuing there until April 1865.

With the American Civil War over, Bright was assigned to the practice ship USS Marion in June 1865. He was then transferred to the USS Susquehanna for special duties in November 1866, serving there until September 1867. While between postings, he was promoted to passed assistant surgeon on 31 December 1867. Bright then spent a year from January 1868 at Washington Naval Hospital before joining the USS Plymouth on the European Station until June 1873. Bright's next posting was to the United States Naval Academy in October, during which he was promoted to surgeon on 12 September 1874. Leaving the academy in August 1876, Bright joined the USS Tuscarora for a coastal survey of Mexico until May 1880. He was then appointed to Mare Island Naval Hospital until May 1883, and subsequently joined the USS Galena on the North Atlantic Station.

Bright left Galena in November 1884, spent May 1885 serving on a medical board, and then until September served with the training ship USS Constellation. He then spent a month with the USS Brooklyn on the North Atlantic Station, before being transferred to Norfolk Navy Yard where he spent the next three years. Bright then returned to the United States Naval Academy as a member of the examination board there between September and October 1889. He was then senior member of the board between September and October 1890, and was then on special duties for the next four years, including the last three with the USS Newark. During this posting Bright was promoted to medical inspector on 11 May 1893, and until July 1894 was fleet surgeon, on board Newark, to the South Atlantic Station.

After a brief period of unemployment, Bright was sent to New York Navy Yard in December 1894, moving back to Washington Naval Hospital in September 1895. He was promoted to medical director on 19 October 1897, and served as such until his retirement on 9 April 1899. He was then promoted to rear-admiral. Bright died in Washington on 12 March 1905; he was married with one son and one daughter.
