= Margherita Arlina Hamm =

American journalist and writer (1871–1907)

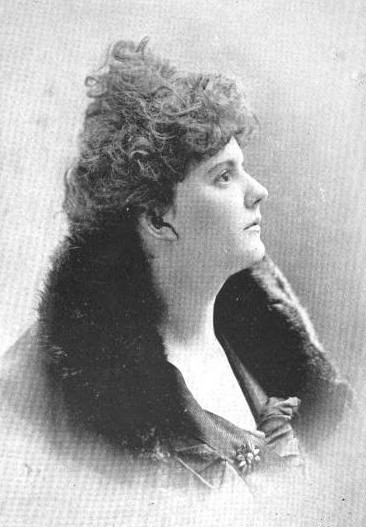
- Margherita Arlina Hamm in 1893
- Born: 1867; St. Stephen, New Brunswick, Canada
- Died: 1907 (aged 39–40); Women's Hospital, New York City, New York, US
- Education: Emerson's College; New York University
- Occupations: journalist and author
- Employer(s): Boston Herald, Peterson's Magazine
- Organization(s): National American Woman Suffrage Association, Women's Congress of Patriotism and Independence

Margherita Arlina Hamm (1867–1907) was a Canadian-born American journalist and author. She was among the earliest women to cover a war from the front lines. She was also a prolific author of popular books, especially relating to travel and famous people. Hamm was both an active suffragist, a supporter, and defender of American overseas imperialism/colonialism at the time of the Spanish–American War- which she covered.

== Early years and education ==
Born in St. Stephen, New Brunswick, Hamm grew up in Bangor, Maine, but left after high school to make her career as a reporter for the Boston Herald. Margherita Arlina Hamm attended school at Emerson’s College, Boston and later on studied science at New York University.

== Career ==
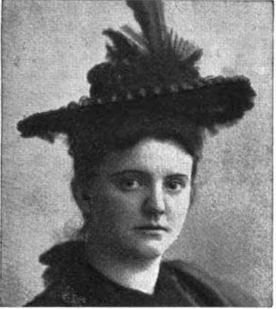
Margherita Arlina Hamm

By 1890, she had moved to New York, where she did freelance reporting for a number of newspapers. In 1893 she married the American Vice-Consul to Amoy, China, and was traveling in Korea when the Sino-Japanese War broke out. She used the opportunity to establish herself as a foreign correspondent for New York newspapers. During her time in Korea in June 1894, she wrote various reports about the attempted assassination of the Queen of Korea and the attack on the palace of Seoul. She also began writing articles for popular magazines, eventually becoming editor of the Women's Dept. of Peterson's Magazine. Hamm was also active in the National American Woman Suffrage Association and was sufficiently well known by 1895 that an article of that year in the Boston Daily Globe entitled "If Women were Members of Congress" included her as a potential candidate, along with Susan B. Anthony and Elizabeth Cady Stanton.

Similar to many Americans, Hamm sympathized with the Cuban uprising against Spain and she eventually left her job in 1898 to cover the Spanish-American war. During the war, she volunteered as a nurse for the national guard and was recognized by the Cuban president Tomas Estrada Palma for her efforts. After the war, she returned to journalism and reported on King Edward VII's coronation. On the outbreak of the Spanish–American War in 1898, Hamm became Chairman of the Women's Congress of Patriotism and Independence in New York, a pro-war group, and soon followed the troops to Puerto Rico, sending back dispatches from the front lines. She spent the next few years writing books and articles about the war and its aftermath, most from a patriotic perspective. Titles included Manila and the Philippines (1898), America's New Possessions and Spheres of Influence (1899), and Dewey the Defender: A Life Sketch of America's Great Admiral. She even composed a hymn to George Dewey. Hamm produced one relatively progressive book, Ghetto Silhouettes (1902) with David Warfield, but her favorite subject — following the war-related books — was the American and New York elite. Titles in this series included Builders of the Republic (1902), Eminent Actors in their Homes (1902), and Famous Families of New York (1902).

Hamm's first marriage ended in divorce. Her second marriage, to a fellow journalist, occurred two days after the first one ended. Hamm died at the age of 40 at Women's Hospital of Pneumonia in New York City after a long struggle with pneumonia.
