= Georgia Nevins =

American nurse

Georgia Marquis Nevins
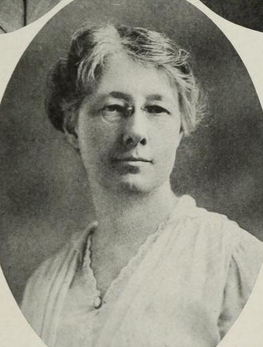
- Georgia M. Nevins, from a 1916 publication.
- Born: October 28, 1864; Bangor, Maine
- Died: October 13, 1957 (aged 92); Chicago
- Occupations: Nurse, nursing educator, hospital administrator

Georgia Marquis Nevins (October 28, 1864 – October 13, 1957) was an American nurse, nursing educator, and hospital administrator.

== Early life ==
Nevins was born in Bangor, Maine, and raised in Easthampton, Massachusetts, the daughter of Augustus Charles Nevins and Helen Virgilia Marquis Nevins. In 1891, she was in the first graduating class of the Johns Hopkins Training School for Nurses.

== Career ==
Nevins superintendent of the Garfield Memorial Hospital in Washington, D.C. for 23 years. She was president of the National League for Nursing Education, and first president of the Graduate Nurses' Association of the District of Columbia. She was a founding officer of the Johns Hopkins School of Nursing Alumnae Association. She was third vice-president of the American Hospital Association for the 1916-1917 academic year.

Nevins became director of the nursing department of the Potomac Division of the American Red Cross in 1917. In 1918, as a Red Cross leader in the region, Nevins called for Virginia women to volunteer to supplement the nursing shortage during the 1918 influenza pandemic. She spoke in favor of expanding home nursing courses and placing public health nurses in more small towns. She retired from the Red Cross in 1920.

== Personal life ==
In 1940, Nevins was living with her widowed sister, Mabel Elizabeth Mather, in Austin, Texas. Nevins died in Chicago in 1957, at age 92.
