= Henry Payson Dowst =

- Born: December 15, 1876; Bangor, Maine, U.S.A.
- Died: March 13, 1921 (aged 44); New York City, New York, U.S.A.
- Occupations: Author, copywriter
- Spouse: Margaret Starr (m. 1900)
- Writing career
- Years active: 1899–1921

Henry Payson Dowst (1876–1921) was an American novelist and short-story writer active in the early twentieth century.

Born on December 15, 1876, in Bangor, Maine and educated at Bangor High School, Dowst was a graduate of the Harvard class of 1899, and lived briefly in Calais, Maine, before becoming General Manager of the Boston publishing house Maynard & Co. In 1916 he went to work for a New York advertising agency, Frank Seaman, Inc., where he remained until his death at age 45.

Despite his day-jobs, Dowst was a prolific contributor of short stories and novelettes to magazines like The Saturday Evening Post, People's Favorite Magazine, and Argosy All-Story Weekly. One bibliography has identified 35 Dowst stories published between 1913 and 1923, though the list is not exhaustive. He also wrote at least two novels in the same period, Bostwick's Budget (Brooklyn, ca. 1920) and The Man from Ashaluna (Boston: Small, Maynard & Co., ca. 1920), the second of which was produced as a film in 1924 (entitled On the Stroke of Three) starring Kenneth Harlan.

Four Dowst short stories were also filmed in his lifetime: An Honest Man (1918), The Redhead (1920, starring Alice Brady), The Dancin' Fool (1920, starring Wallace Reid), and Smiling All the Way (1920, from the story Alice in Underland). Dowst died at the very height of his writing career, his last novelette, The Hands of Man, being published posthumously in Munsey's Magazine in 1923.

At least one of Dowst's stories was co-authored with his wife, Margaret Starr Dowst, a graduate of Wellesley College, whom he married in 1900.

Dowst died in New York on March 13, 1921, aged 44, but was buried in Bangor.
