= Walter Franklin Lansil =

American painter

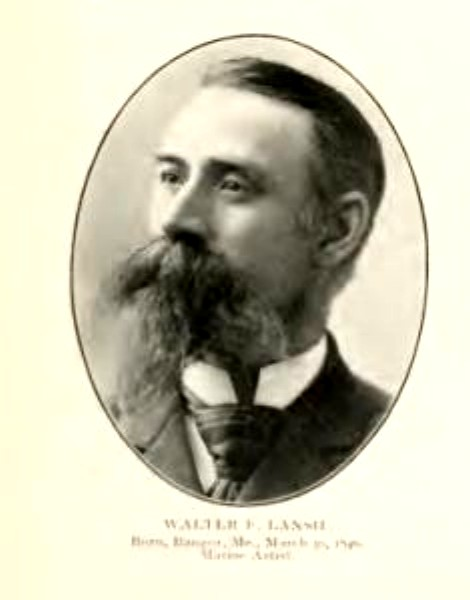
- Lansil c. 1880
- Born: March 30, 1846; Bangor, Maine, US
- Died: January 22, 1925 (aged 78); Boston, Massachusetts, US
- Education: Académie Julian
- Occupation: Painter

Walter Franklin Lansil (1846–1925) was an American painter.

== Biography ==
Walter Franklin Lansil was born in Bangor, Maine, on March 30, 1846, to Asa Paine Lansil and Betsey Turner Grout. He was a descendant of Stephen Hopkins of the Mayflower and Edmund Rice an early immigrant to the Massachusetts Bay Colony. He first studied under Jeremiah Pearson Hardy, then moved to Boston, Massachusetts, in 1872 with his younger brother and fellow painter Wilbur Henry "Bibber" Lansil (1855–1897). In 1888 the brothers sailed to Europe, where Lansil studied at the Académie Julian in Paris and became enchanted with Venice, a city he'd paint for the rest of his life. By 1891 the brothers had returned to Boston, were living together at 101 Maxwell Street Dorchester with their brothers Asa Brainard Lansil and Edwin Lansil and Edwin's wife and children (brothers Walter, Wilbur and Asa never married) and began holding joint exhibits at their studio in Dorchester.

Walter Lansil was a member of the Boston Art Club and The Society of Sons of the Revolution. Although the New York Times called him in 1897 "the celebrated Venetian painter", he also painted marine scenes, battles, and portraits. In 1914 he published a memoir entitled A Trip to Venice. He died on January 22, 1925, in Boston, and was buried at Mount Hope Cemetery in Bangor.
