= Jeremiah Pearson Hardy =

American painter (c.1800–1888)

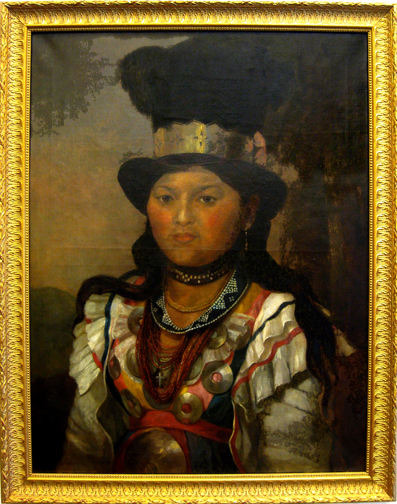
Copy of Jeremiah Pearson Hardy's portrait of Sarah Molasses, by his daughter Anna Eliza Hardy, collection of Peabody Museum (Harvard)

Jeremiah Pearson Hardy (c. 1800–1888) was a painter who specialized in portraits. He spent most of his career in Bangor, Maine. He was also the central figure in a circle of 19th-century Bangor painters that included his daughter, Anna Eliza Hardy (1839–1934), sister Mary Ann Hardy, and pupils Isabel Graham Eaton, Walter Franklin Lansil and George Edward Dale.

Hardy was born in Pelham, New Hampshire but moved to Hampden, Massachusetts, with his parents in 1811. In 1820 this area became Maine. He first studied painting in Boston under David Brown, and then in New York under Samuel F.B. Morse, who was also the inventor of the telegraph. By 1826 Hardy had moved to Bangor, then a booming lumber port, and stayed for the rest of his life, painting portraits of not only the local elite but Penobscot people (a Native American group), the African-American barber Abraham Hanson, and members of his own family.

Hardy's artistic style developed rapidly after his initial schooling. In the 1820s, he painted several elegant miniatures and masterful portraits of his parents and prominent citizens. He filled the walls of his Bangor studio with genre paintings, including studies of his family members painted by candlelight and firelight. By the 1830s, he was painting wealthy Bangor citizens but needed to travel to other parts of the State to find work. His mature period from 1840-1856 is well documented in a ledger he kept of his artistic transactions. Many of the paintings listed still exist in the Bangor area, particularly in the collections of the Bangor Public Library, Bangor Historical Society, Isaac Farrar Mansion, Bangor Theological Seminary, University of Maine Museum of Art, and the University of Maine's Special Collections at the Fogler Library. By the 1850s, it is clear that the new medium of photography influenced his paintings, and in the 1859-60 Bangor City Directory, Hardy is listed as a portrait painter and photographer with his son Francis. Hardy returned to genre painting in the 1870s, and appears to have painted little in his old age, dying at age 87 in 1888.

Among his extant works are:

- Mary Ann Hardy (1821, Collection of Boston Museum of Fine Arts)
- Self-portrait (miniature, 1824, Collection of Bowdoin College)
- Portrait of Abraham Hanson (1825, Collection of Addison Gallery, Andover, MA)
- Sarah Polasses (c. 1828, Collection of Tarratine Club, Bangor, ME)
- Lt. Governor John Neptune (c. 1835-40, Collection of Tarratine Club, Bangor ME)
- Child Feeding a Parrot (c. 1832, Collection of Bangor Public Library)
- Children Fishing (c. 1836, Collection of Portland Museum of Art, Portland ME and a second version, Private Collection, in ME)
- Catherine Wheeler Hardy and Her Daughter (c. 1842, Collection of Boston Museum of Fine Arts)
- Frances Veazie Lord (1847, Collection of Bangor Historical Society)
- Reverend John Sawyer (1848, Collection of Bangor Theological Seminary, Bangor, ME)
- Nathaniel Lord (c. 1847-1853, Collection of Bangor Historical Society)
- Mrs. W. Blake (1850, collection of Bowdoin College)
- The Smelt Seller (c. 1870-1880, Collection of Farnsworth Art Museum, Rockland, ME)
- The Artists's Rose Garden (1879, Collection of Colby College)

Hardy's brother Jonathan became a successful local fur-trapper, as did Jonathan's son, Manly Hardy. Manly Hardy's daughter (Jeremiah Hardy's grandniece) was the folklorist Fannie Pearson Hardy Eckstorm.
