= Corelli (surname) =

Corelli is an Italian surname. Notable people with the surname include:

- Arcangelo Corelli (1653–1713), Italian violinist and composer of Baroque music
- Arrol Corelli (born 1985), Indian music composer
- Buba Corelli, stage name of Amar Hodžić (born 1989), Bosnian rapper
- Franco Corelli (1921–2003), Italian tenor
- Marie Corelli (1855–1924), British novelist
