= Jay Stone =

American civil servant

Jay Stone (c. 1851–1932) was the 'Chief of the Correspondence Division' in the United States War Department in the late nineteenth and early twentieth centuries. In a period without 'Assistant Secretaries', this was the second highest-ranking civil service position in this cabinet-level department, under the Chief Clerk (who sometimes served as Acting Secretary of War). Stone retired in 1928 as the department's longest-serving civilian employee (50 years).

Born in Bangor, Maine, Stone enlisted in the cavalry at 18 and went west. In 1877, he was chosen as "phonographic reporter and Indian interpreter" to Gen. Alfred H. Terry's Commission sent to negotiate with Sioux chief Sitting Bull, who had fled to Canada after winning the Battle of the Little Big Horn. Stone had learned the new skill of stenography (then called phonography), and, according to a newspaper report, was the first stenographer ever employed by the War Department. He continued for some time to work at Terry's headquarters, but by 1881 was listed as the 'private secretary' to Secretary of War Robert Todd Lincoln (the President's son) in the administration of James Garfield. Stone was on Garfield's funeral train after his assassination that same year.

Secretary of War Lincoln stayed on in the administration of Chester Arthur, and Stone was promoted to 'Chief of the Correspondence Division'. In 1882 he became Acting Chief Clerk during a leave of absence of Chief Clerk John Tweedale. Stone would take dictation for three Secretaries of War before being sent to New York to serve as Chief Clerk of the U.S. Army Corps of Engineers, the post from which he retired.
