= Susan Lubner =

American writer of children's books

- Education: Simmons College
- Occupation: Children’s book author
- Children: 2
- Writing career
- Genre: Children's
- Website: www.susanlubner.com

Susan Lubner is an American writer of children's books. She grew up in Bangor, Maine, and resides in Wellesley, Massachusetts.

== Career ==
Her works include the early reader chapter book series DRAG and REX illustrated by Blythe Russo; (Pixel + Ink) Book 1 Forever Friends (2023); Book 2 Sweet and Silly (2024); the middle grade novels Lizzy and the Good Luck Girl (November 2018, RP Kids/Hachette Book Group); The Upside of Ordinary (October 2012, Holiday House); the picture books A Horse's Tale: A Colonial Williamsburg Adventure (2008 Abrams, illustrated by Margie Moore); Ruthie Bon Bair: Do Not Go To Bed With Wringing Wet Hair! (2006 Abrams, illustrated by Bruce Whatley) and Noises at Night, (2005 Abrams, co-authored by Beth Raisner Glass, illustrated by Bruce Whatley).

Her stories have been published in Spider Magazine and Highlights. She has presented at conferences such as the National Council of Teachers of English convention and the Massachusetts Library Association Conference.

== Bibliography ==
- Drag and Rex Series: Book 1 Forever Friends (November 2023); Book 2 Sweet and Silly (November 2024) Illustrated by Blythe Russo Pixel + Ink ISBN 978-1645951155
- Lizzy and the Good Luck Girl (November 2018) New York City: RP Kids/Hachette Book Group ISBN 978-0-7624-6502-6
- The Upside of Ordinary (October 2012) New York City: Holiday House ISBN 978-0-8234-2417-7
- A Horse's Tale: A Colonial Williamsburg Adventure. illus. by Margie Moore. New York City: Abrams Books for Young Readers. April 1, 2008. ISBN 978-0-8109-9490-4.
- Ruthie Bon Bair: Do Not Go To Bed With Wringing Wet Hair!. illus. by Bruce Whatley. New York City: Abrams Books for Young Readers. October 1, 2006. ISBN 978-0-8109-5470-0.
- Beth Raisner Glass; Susan Lubner (October 1, 2005). Noises at Night. illus. by Bruce Whatley. New York City: Abrams Books for Young Readers. ISBN 978-0-8109-5750-3.
