= Ruel Perley Smith =

American novelist

Ruel Perley Smith (1869–1937) was a novelist and newspaper editor best known for the Rival Camper series of boys' books, published by L.C. Page & Co. of Boston in the first decade of the 20th century. Born in Bangor, Maine, Smith made his career as a newspaper reporter in New York, eventually becoming Night City Editor (and Sunday Editor) of New York World in the 1920s.

The Rival Camper series of boys' books was set in Smith's native Maine. It included The Rival Campers, or, The Adventures of Henry Burns (1905); The Rival Campers Afloat, or, The Prize Yacht Viking (1906); The Rival Campers Ashore, or, The Mystery of the Mill (1907); and Jack Harvey's Adventures, or, The Rival Campers Among the Oyster Pirates (1908). The series ended in the second decade of the twentieth century. When Smith again tried his hand at a novel, in the early 1920s, it was aimed at an adult audience. Prisoners of Fortune: A Tale of the Massachusetts Bay Colony (Boston: L.C. Page, 1924) was actually a pirate story with Massachusetts as only one location.

Smith was married to Ellen Cyr Smith (Ellen M. Cyr) (d. 1920), author of the widely used Cyr's Readers series for elementary school children. His sister, Helena Wood Smith, was a painter and a member of the artists' colony at Carmel-by-the-Sea, California, where in 1914 she was murdered by her lover, the Japanese photographer George Kotani.
