= Artemus E. Weatherbee =

United States Department of the Treasury official

Artemus E. Weatherbee (February 9, 1918 - November 19, 1995) was an American Assistant Secretary of the Treasury and director of the Asian Development Bank with the rank of ambassador.

Weatherbee was born in Bangor, Maine and attended Bangor High School. A Kirstein scholarship enabled him to attend and graduate from the University of Maine at Orono, from where he was recruited into the New Deal administration of Franklin Roosevelt as Chief Appointment and Planning Officer of the Farm Credit Administration, based in Kansas City, Missouri. In 1942 he was called to Washington to work as Senior Classification Officer in the Office of Emergency Management. After joining the Navy in World War II, Weatherbee remained in Washington for the next 28 years, becoming Deputy Assistant Postmaster General (Personnel) in 1957 and then Assistant Secretary of the Treasury (Administration) in 1959.

In 1970, President Richard Nixon appointed Weatherbee as the American Director of the Asian Development Bank, based in Manila, with the rank of ambassador. He served in that post until 1975, when he retired to Maine (first Bangor, and then Kennebunk). He subsequently became president of the Kennebunkport Chamber of Commerce, and a trustee of the University of Maine. The later position often brought him into the newspapers as a lone dissenter or minority vote on board matters. Weatherbee in retirement was an unapologetic conservative. He told the Bangor Daily News on returning from the Philippines, for example, that Ferdinand Marcos' declaration of martial law had saved Manila from "really complete chaos" and rendered it "once again a beautiful and livable city".

Weatherbee is the recipient of the Alexander Hamilton Award for leadership in the Treasury Dept., as well as the $10,000 Rockefeller Prize.
