= Michael Daley (boxer) =

American boxer

Michael Daley [sometimes Michael Daly] (1865–1910) was a boxer from Bangor, Maine who held the lightweight title for New England in the late nineteenth century, and was a claimant for the lightweight title of America in 1893. In 1903, however, Daley was convicted, along with world middle-weight champion George La Blanche of robbing a drunken man in a Bangor hotel and sentenced to two years imprisonment. According to the New York Times Daley was from a 'highly respectable' family.

Daley fought and defeated Marcellus Baker of Boston in 1884. The New England lightweight championship had been bestowed on him by 1887, when the VC Club of Gardiner, Maine awarded him a belt emblazoned with the title after an exhibition fight with another Bangor boxer, James Mehan. In 1889 Daley went fifteen rounds in Boston with another boxer formerly from Bangor, Jack McAuliffe, 'The Napoleon of the Ring', who finished his career undefeated. Daley survived with a technical draw.

In 1892 Daley was undefeated, and by 1893, was claiming the title of lightweight champion of America. But he had to fight for the title that year against Austin Gibbons, at the Crescent City Club in New Orleans. The contest was a grueling one, and Daley's longest, and ended in his knock-out in the thirty-first round.

In 1899 Daley bought the former Elk's Lodge in Bangor and fitted it out as a boxing academy.

Daley died in a Bangor jail cell while under arrest for another crime in 1910. He had opened a new boxing club earlier that same year.
