= Paul F. Smith =

United States Army general

- Born: November 15, 1915; Taunton, Massachusetts
- Died: October 20, 2014 (aged 98); Viera, Florida
- Burial place: Arlington National Cemetery
- Military career
- Allegiance: United States
- Branch: United States Army
- Service years: 1935–1968
- Rank: Major General
- Commands: 173rd Airborne Brigade; 2nd Airborne Battle Group, 504th Infantry Regiment; United States Army Airborne School
- Conflicts: World War II; Korean War; Vietnam War
- Awards: Distinguished Service Cross; Army Distinguished Service Medal; Silver Star (2); Legion of Merit (3); Bronze Star Medal (3); Purple Heart (5)

Paul F. Smith (November 15, 1915 – October 20, 2014) was a United States Army major general who served as commander of the 173rd Airborne Brigade during the Vietnam War.

== Early life and education ==
Smith was born in Taunton, Massachusetts, on November 15, 1915. He was educated at Taunton High School.

== Military service ==
Smith enrolled in the United States Army Reserve in 1935. He served with the 507th Parachute Infantry Regiment during World War II, jumping into Normandy on D-Day. He served at the Battle of the Bulge and made a further combat jump during Operation Varsity.

From 1945 to 1948 Smith served as commanding officer of the United States Army Airborne School at Fort Benning. From 1948 to 1950 he served as G3 Eighth United States Army in Japan.

With the outbreak of the Korean War in June 1950, Smith served with Eighth Army (forward) at Daegu, Korea until 1951 and was awarded the Legion of Merit. He then returned to Japan joining Headquarters Far East Command.

From 1952 to 1956 Smith served at The Pentagon as Operations Officer and then as Military Assistant Secretary of the Army. In 1957 he graduated from the United States Army War College. From 1957 to 1960 he served as commander of the 2nd Airborne Battle Group, 504th Infantry Regiment in West Germany.

From 1960 to 1964 Smith served as assistant commander/G2 and deputy commander/Operations & Plans XVIII Airborne Corps at Fort Bragg. He was promoted to brigadier general in June 1964 and served as army adviser to Military Assistance Advisory Group, Taiwan.

In July 1965 Smith was assigned to South Vietnam where he served as Deputy Commanding General and Chief of Staff Task Force Alpha, later redesignated I Field Force, Vietnam, Nha Trang. He was appointed Commanding General, 173rd Airborne Brigade in February 1966. In November 1966 he was promoted to major general and in December 1966 he handed over command of the 173rd Airborne and then served as Deputy for Revolutionary Development to Robert Komer in Saigon.

On his return from South Vietnam in June 1967, Smith served as Chairman Special Study Group Joint Chiefs of Staff until his retirement.

== Later life ==
Smith retired from the army on 11 August 1968 and then worked as Executive Director of the Central Florida Development Committee until 1974.
