= Prescott Freese Dennett =

Prescott Freese Dennett (October 12, 1907 – October 7, 1992) was one of 30 people indicted for sedition for sympathizing with the Axis powers, in his case Nazi Germany, and tried in Washington in 1944. The case ended in mistrial on Dec. 7, 1944. Dennett petitioned unsuccessfully to reopen the trial in order to clear his name, the only one of the defendants to do so.

Dennett was born in Bangor, Maine and attended Bangor High School and then Wheaton College in Illinois. Winning an essay contest at Wheaton, he transferred to the journalism school of Columbia University, where he was awarded a pulitzer traveling scholarship for travel in Europe. In 1939 he was a publicist in Washington, D.C. when he was paid by German agent George Sylvester Viereck to front (as Treasurer) the "Make Europe Pay its War Debt Committee" and later the "Islands for War Debt Committee", both of which were aimed to prevent the American government from extending aid to war-time Britain and France. Dennett was at the center of an elaborate scheme by which isolationist Congressmen such as Hamilton Fish III and Robert Rice Reynolds would make pro-German statements in the Congressional Record, which would then be printed by Viereck and mailed around the country without postal charge using the Congressional franking privilege. Just before Federal agents raided Dennett's offices, he transferred a number of bags of illegally franked mail to Representative Fish's office, where they were subsequently discovered. Fish's chief aid George Hill was convicted of perjury in connection with the case. Hill was sentenced to two to 6 years in prison, which was reduced to 10 months to 3 years on appeal.

Dennett was inducted into the army as a private in 1941, but was subpeoned by a grand jury in September, and then indicted in July 1942, (by which time America had declared war on Germany) with 29 other defendants on sedition charges. Most of the others charged were confirmed Nazi (or Japanese) sympathizers or agents. Dennett claimed not to harbor such sympathies, but to have only been used by Viereke and his isolationist allies in Congress. When the case resulted in mistrial in 1944, Dennett alone petitioned for a new trial in order to clear his name. This was denied, and he continued to petition Congress after the war, eventually forming a "Justice for New Deal Victims Committee" in 1948.
