= Frederick H. Costello =

American novelist (1851–1921)

Frederick Hankerson Costello (September 24, 1851 – 1921) was an author of adventure novels. Born and raised in Bangor, Maine, Costello specialized in nautical fiction, but made at least one early contribution to the genre later called prehistoric fiction with his Sure-Dart of 1909. His books were normally pitched to a young adult audience. Costello's 'day-job', at which he worked for 30 years, was as Bangor manager for the national credit-reporting firm R. G. Dunn.

The Boston Globe reported in 1910 that Costello owned a talking crow, who could say 'papa', 'mama', 'what' and "a number of other short words".

== Bibliography ==
- Master Ardick: Buccaneer (New York: D. Appleton, 1896; reprinted 1906)
- On Fighting Decks in 1812 (Boston: Dana Estes, 1899)
- A Tar of the Old School (Boston: Dana Estes, 1900)
- Nelson's Yankee Boy: The Adventures of a Plucky Young New Englander at Trafalgar and Elsewhere, and Later in the War of 1812 (Holt, 1904)
- Sure-Dart: A Story of Strange Hunters and Stranger Game in the Days of Monsters (Chicago: A.C. McClurg & Co., 1909)
- The Girl with Two Selves (Chicago: A.C. McClurg & Co.,1913)
- Morgan's Youngest Rifleman (Laird & Lee, 1913)
- Under the Rattlesnake Flag
