= Howard E. Penley =

Howard E. Penley was an organizer and official of the Socialist Party of America who was forcibly inducted into the U.S. Armed Forces in the Second World War after claiming conscientious objector status for political and religious reasons.

Penley was a resident of both Bangor, Maine and Dorchester, Massachusetts in the early 1940s and an active political organizer in both places. As the New England District Secretary of the Socialist Party of America, he filed an objection with the government of the state of Maine in 1940 after its presidential election returns that year registered zero votes for Socialist Party candidates. Penley, who with five other Socialists had run as presidential electors, called the returns "ridiculous, as obviously the five presidential electors would have voted for themselves". His petition for a recount was denied on a technicality, however (it came after the 20-day legal filing period).

In January, 1943 Penley picketed the British Consulate in Boston as Chairman of the Boston Free India Now Committee.

On Dec. 23, 1943, Penley was taken into custody by FBI agents in Bangor as he was about to board a train for Caribou, Maine to spend Christmas with his wife's family. In response to a draft notice, he had filed a written statement saying he would not report for induction because he objected to the war on political and religious grounds. He was arraigned in Bangor on fugitive charges, temporarily jailed, and forcibly inducted into the U.S. military.

Penley had previously attempted to join the U.S. merchant marine rather than a fighting unit, but had been denied, according to his petition, because of his politics and record as a labor organizer. His conscientious objector status was denied in 1943 because, according to the government, he was "not religious", although he was a member of the Unitarian Church and had recently preached a sermon. He claimed objection to war in general "and this one in particular" because America's allies included the King of Italy and Joseph Stalin.

After the war Penley moved to Reading, Pennsylvania, where he continued work as a Socialist Party organizer. In 1947 he organized the sending of CARE packages to needy Spanish Republican refugees stranded in post-war France.
