= Katya Alpert Gilden =

American novelist

Katya Alpert Gilden (March 9, 1914 – May 5, 1991) was an American best-selling novelist who wrote with her husband Bert Gilden under the pen-name "K. B. Gilden". The couple produced two major novels, Hurry Sundown (1964), which was made into an Otto Preminger film of the same title in 1967, and Between the Hills and the Sea (1971), published four months after Bert's death.

== Biography ==
Gilden was born in Bangor, Maine and graduated from Radcliffe College in 1935. While an undergraduate, she was the first woman to publish in the Harvard Advocate, submitting a poem, and a story about a fight between a black and a white boxer. The themes of race, gender, and inequality would resurface in her two novels. Hurry Sundown is about black and white Southern sharecroppers, and Between the Hills and the Sea about factory workers and labor relations in the 1940s and 1950s. The Gildens considered themselves "novelist[s] of the world of work", and were heavily influenced by essays on proletarian fiction by György Lukács.

The Gildens spent fourteen years writing Hurry Sundown, which was published in 1964. The book received a big publicity push from the publisher, Doubleday, and sold "a respectable but not blockbuster" 300,000 copies. Reviews were mixed. One criticism of the book was its extreme length (1046 pages). Time called it a "punch-card novel" because of its predictability, and the Chicago Tribune called it "a novel lost in its own maze". However, Orville Prescott in The New York Times wrote that "no novel of the year will be more engrossing" thanks to "a surge of life that is unforgettable".

The couple sold the movie rights before publication to Otto Preminger for $100,000. Rumor would vastly inflate the price, to $795,000. The misunderstanding arose from a newspaper editor's "persistent phone calls to Preminger, who refused to reveal the purchase price. 'Oh, come on,' the editor pleaded. 'What did the book cost you?' Preminger replied, 'Seven ninety-five.' He meant the retail price in the bookstore, $7.95."

The Gildens' second novel, Between the Hills and the Sea, published in 1971, was neither a commercial nor critical success. Christopher Lehmann-Haupt in the New York Times wrote, "This isn't the worst novel I've ever read. But it's definitely a contender." Nonetheless, because of its highly detailed passages about labor union politics, the book was republished in 1989 by Cornell University International Labor Relations Press.

Gilden lived the later part of her life in Cambridge, Massachusetts and died in Boston. She had three children.
