= Corelli C. W. Simpson =

American poet

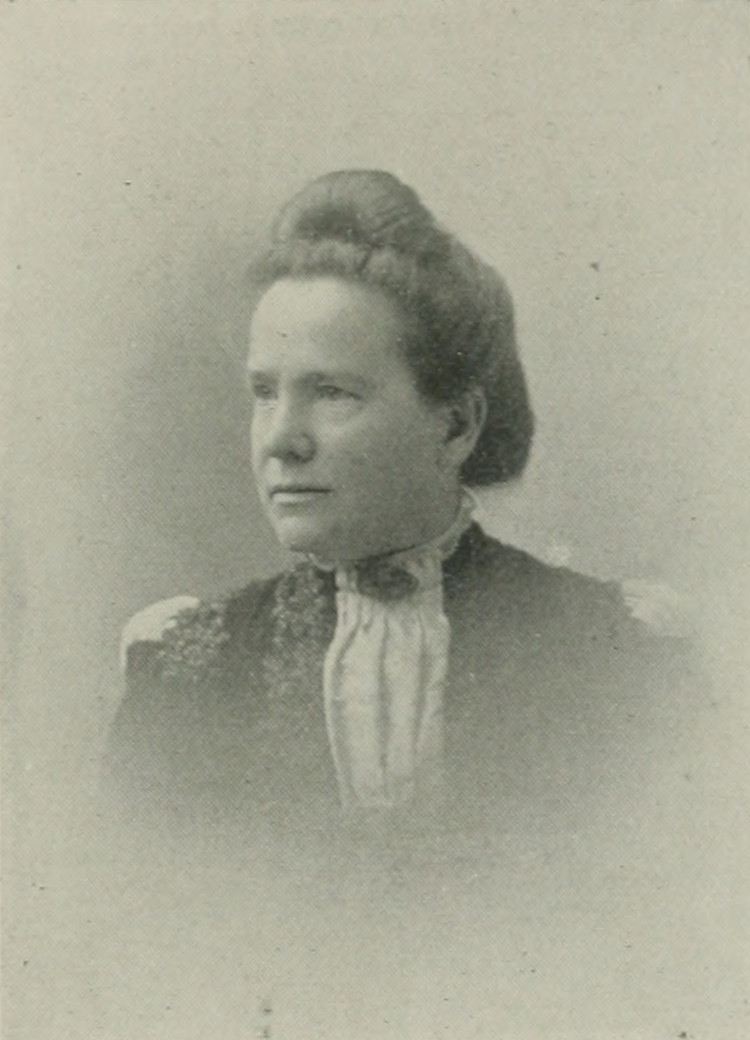
"A Woman of the Century"

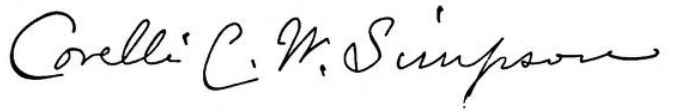
signature

Corelli C. W. Simpson (February 20, 1837 – 1923) was an American poet and cookbook author, who painted many artistic works in oil. In 1864, she opened the first kindergarten in Bangor, Maine.

== Early life and education ==
Corelli Caswell Williams was born in Taunton, Massachusetts, February 20, 1837. She was one of a pair of twin daughters. Her father was Capt. Francis Dighton Williams. Her parents were of New England ancestry on both sides. Her mother was Corelli Caswell (d. 1889), whose father, Cyrus Caswell, a lover of music, gave to his daughter the Italian name of Corelli, from an air he was fond of playing on his violin. She handed it down by giving to her twin daughters, the names Corelli and Salome. So much alike were these sisters, that they were distinguished by their pink and blue ribbons.

Williams was thoroughly educated in both public and private schools, chiefly in the Bristol academy, the Taunton High School, and the Salisbury mission school, in Worcester, Massachusetts.

== Career ==
In March, 1863, Simpson went to Bangor, Maine, to visit her sister, Mrs. Salome C. Hatch. Simpson opened the first kindergarten in that city, in 1864, becoming at once very popular. Mr. A. L. Simpson, a member of the Penobscot bar, at that time a widower, who led his daughter Gertrude daily to the kindergarten teacher, perceived her qualities and asked her to oversee his home garden. They were married September 20, 1865. In December, 1888. their daughter, Maude, was born and in May, 1871, their son, Howard Williams, was born.

Simpson wrote her poems mainly in moments of inspiration, and not as a serious task. Her productions appeared in various popular periodicals and were warmly received. In 1883, a fair for the benefit of the YMCA was held in Bangor, and Simpson was asked to give something saleable. The result was Tete-a-tete Cook Book, of which 1,000 copies were sold. She published an enlarged edition in 1891. Leaflets of Artists (Bangor: John H. Bacon, 1893. Pp. 59), comprises sketches of the lives of artists by eminent writers.

She was a member of the Daughters of the American Revolution.

== Selected works ==
- Tete-a-tete Cook Book, 1883
- Leaflets of artists, 1893
