= Young Hunting =

Traditional folk song

"Young Hunting" is a traditional folk song, Roud 47, catalogued by Francis James Child as Child Ballad number 68, and has its origin in Scotland. Like most traditional songs, numerous variants of the song exist worldwide, notably under the title of "Henry Lee" and "Love Henry" in the United States and "Earl Richard" and sometimes "The Proud Girl" in the United Kingdom.

The song, which can be traced back as far as the 18th century, narrates the tale of the eponymous protagonist, Young Hunting, who tells a woman, who may have borne him a child, that he is in love with another, more beautiful woman. Despite this, she persuades him to drink until he is drunk, then to come to her bedroom, or at least kiss her farewell. The woman then stabs him to death. She throws his body in the river—sometimes with the help of one of the other women of the town, whom she bribes with a diamond ring—and is taunted by a bird. She tries to lure the bird down from the tree but it tells her that she will kill it if it comes within reach. When the search for Young Hunting starts, she either denies seeing him or claims that he left earlier, but when Hunting's remains are found, in order to relieve her guilt, she reveals that she murdered him and is later burned at the stake. Nick Cave, who recorded the song, referred to the song as "a story about the fury of a scorned woman."

== Variants and origins ==
American variants of the song are more widely known as the song has been physically released. One of the earliest recorded variants was performed by blues singer Dick Justice in 1929 under the title "Henry Lee". The recording was anthologised in the first disc of Harry Smith's Anthology of American Folk Music, released in 1952. Judy Henske included a version of the song titled "Love Henry"—a title collected by Cecil Sharp in September 1916 from Orilla Keeton in Mountfair, Virginia—on her eponymous debut album in 1963. A version named "Love Henry" was included by Bob Dylan on his album World Gone Wrong in 1993. A version of this song was also recorded by Karan Casey and John Doyle for their 2010 album Exiles Return as "The False Lady". English singer Nancy Kerr recorded a version of "Young Hunting" on her 1997 Fellside Recordings CD Starry Gazy Pie which she stated in the liner notes as coming from The Ballad Tree by E. K. Wells, who in turn quotes her source as Barry, Eckstorm and Smyth's 1929 work British Ballads from Maine.

English variants of the song, which are closely structured on the original Scottish versions, are also known under the titles "Earl Richard" and "The Proud Girl". A version of the song, credited as "Earl Richard", was recorded by English folk singer Tim Hart in 1969 and its liner notes state: "[the song] [...] is a shorter version of the ballad 'Young Hunting'. [...] this version comes from Motherwell's Minstrelsy of the Scottish Border." Spiers and Boden recorded a version of the English variant in 2001 on the album Through & Through and credited the author as "Miss Stephenson of Glasgow" and said it was written in 1825. "The Proud Girl" is an arrangement of the song by A. L. Lloyd that was performed at the Top Lock Folk Club in Runcorn, Cheshire on 5 November 1972. This performance, which was the basis of Frankie Armstrong's 1997 version, was released in 2010 on An Evening with A.L. Lloyd and was noted to have been traced back three generations further.

== Related songs ==
The song is closely related to another Child Ballad, "Young Benjie", as it not only deals with a similar theme, but almost identical story, in which a male lover is murdered and thrown in a river by his female companion. "Child Waters" and "The False Lover Won Back", both murder ballads and Child Ballads, are similar and all four songs may have the same origin.

Another similar song is "Lowe Bonnie", recorded by Jimmie Tarlton in 1930 and the Klemmedsons of the Ozark Folk Center, Mountain View, Arkansas, in 1972. It too is considered a variant of Child #68: Lowe Bonnie is described as a "hunting young man", he tells his "old true love" that he has a new woman, and she stabs him to death with a pen knife.

== Nick Cave and the Bad Seeds version ==
"Henry Lee"

Single by Nick Cave and the Bad Seeds and PJ Harvey

from the album Murder Ballads
- B-side: "King Kong Kitchee Kitchee Ki-Mi-O"
- Released: 26 February 1996
- Recorded: 1995 at Sing Sing and Metropolis Studios in Melbourne, Australia and Wessex and Worldwide Studios in London, United Kingdom
- Genre: Rock; folk rock
- Length: 3:58
- Label: Mute
- Songwriters: Traditional; Nick Cave (arranger)
- Producers: Tony Cohen; Victor Van Vugt

Nick Cave and the Bad Seeds singles chronology
"Where the Wild Roses Grow" (1995)	"Henry Lee" (1996)	"Into My Arms" (1997)

Music video
- "Henry Lee" on YouTube

"Henry Lee", a variant of "Young Hunting", is a song by the Australian post-punk band Nick Cave and the Bad Seeds. It is the third track and second single from the band's ninth studio album, Murder Ballads (1996), and was released on 26 February 1996 on Mute Records. The song, which features a duet between frontman Nick Cave and the English alternative rock musician PJ Harvey, is alternately–arranged in comparison to other more traditional versions of "Henry Lee". Lyrically, the song borrows heavily from Dick Justice's version of the song.

=== Recording ===
The majority of the studio version of "Henry Lee" was recorded by the Bad Seeds at Sing Sing Studios and Metropolis Studios in Melbourne with Cave's vocal track. Harvey's vocal track was recorded at Wessex and Worldwide Studios in London. A demo version of the song which was sent to Harvey featured the Bad Seeds member Blixa Bargeld performing guide vocals. The single's two B-sides are other American murder ballads, following the album's theme and do not feature Harvey. However, "Knoxville Girl" features James Johnston on acoustic guitar.

=== Track listing ===
All songs of traditional origin and arranged by Nick Cave.

7"

1. "Henry Lee" – 3:58
2. "King Kong Kitchee Kitchee Ki-Mi-O" – 3:09

CD single

1. "Henry Lee" - 3:58
2. "King Kong Kitchee Kitchee Ki-Mi-O" – 3:09
3. "Knoxville Girl" – 3:34

=== Music video ===
Directed by Rocky Schenck, and produced by Nick Verden for Atlas Films, the promotional music video for "Henry Lee" features one scene throughout; Nick Cave, in the role of Henry Lee, and PJ Harvey, in the role of his lover, singing the duet. There is a constant green backdrop in the background of the video. This format contrasted the former format used by Schenck for "Where the Wild Roses Grow" which focused on cinematography and featured several scenes. Body language is a stand-out feature of the video and after many varying forms of it, the pair slow dance at the end of the video.

=== Charts ===
Chart (1996)	Peak position
Australia (ARIA)	73
European Alternative Radio Airplay (Music & Media)	9
Finland (Suomen virallinen lista)	15
Scotland Singles (Official Charts)	45
Sweden (Topplistan)	35
UK Singles (Official Charts)	36
UK Indie (Music Week)	7
