= Frozen Charlotte =

Frozen Charlotte may refer to:

- Frozen Charlotte (doll), 19th-century doll named for the ballad "Fair Charlotte"
- Frozen Charlotte (album), a 2026 album by Jack White
- Frozen Charlotte, a 1998 album by Dollshead
- "Frozen Charlotte", a 1998 song by Natalie Merchant from Ophelia
- "Frozen Charlottes", a 2003 short story by Lucy Sussex

== See also ==
- "Fair Charlotte", American folk ballad inspired by an 1843 poem by Seba Smith
