= Ann Sarnoff =

American television executive

- Born: Ann Marie Misiaszek; 1961 (age 64–65); Wilbraham, Massachusetts, US
- Education: Georgetown University (BS); Harvard University (MBA)
- Occupation: Business executive
- Years active: 1993–present
- Title: Former chairwoman and CEO of Warner Bros. Entertainment, founder of VH1 Classic and TV Land, co-founder of Noggin
- Spouse: Richard Sarnoff (m. 1990)
- Children: 2

Ann Marie Sarnoff (née Misiaszek; born c. 1961) is an American television executive. She became the chairwoman and CEO of Warner Bros. Entertainment in the summer of 2019. Sarnoff was the first woman to hold the position at the company.

== Early life and education ==
Sarnoff was born in Massachusetts. She is a 1979 graduate of Minnechaug Regional High School in Wilbraham, Massachusetts.

In 1983, Sarnoff received a Bachelor of Science degree in marketing from McDonough School of Business from Georgetown University. In 1987, Sarnoff received a Master of Business Administration degree from Harvard Business School.

== Career ==
Sarnoff started out as a strategic consultant at Marakon Associates.

From 1993 to 2003, Sarnoff worked at Viacom. Her first job at Viacom was in the corporate development department. After leaving corporate, Sarnoff was the head of Nickelodeon consumer products and business development during Geraldine Laybourne's leadership of the company. In 1999, while working at Nickelodeon, Sarnoff was part of a team that created the TV channel Noggin, a joint venture between Nickelodeon and Sesame Workshop. Sarnoff also helped create the television channel TV Land, which started as Nick at Nite's TV Land in 1996. Two shows she promoted were Rugrats and Blue's Clues. Sarnoff served as executive vice president of business strategy and program enterprises at VH1.

In 2001, she became chief operating officer of VH1 and Country Music Television, with the task of integrating the two channels. During her time at VH1, Sarnoff launched the TV channel, VH1 Classic.

In February 2004, Sarnoff was chief operating officer of the Women's National Basketball Association.

In 2006, Sarnoff joined Dow Jones Ventures as president and senior vice president of strategy, a position she held for four years. In this position, she ran the executive conference business for The Wall Street Journal.

From 2010 to 2015, Sarnoff was chief operating officer of BBC Worldwide North America, where she worked with Herb Scannell, who she had worked with at Nickelodeon. In August 2015, Sarnoff became president of BBC Studios Americas, formerly known as BBC Worldwide Americas. In 2015, she launched the subscription TV channel, BBC Earth, and promoted shows like Doctor Who, Top Gear, Dancing with the Stars, Sherlock, Orphan Black, and Killing Eve. From 2016 to 2018, Sarnoff was head of BBC Worldwide's Global Production Network. In 2017, she launched Britbox, a streaming service for North America.

In the summer of 2019, Sarnoff became the first woman CEO of Warner Bros. Entertainment, then a subsidiary of WarnerMedia. Sarnoff succeeded Kevin Tsujihara and reported to John Stankey. Toby Emmerich, the head of Warner Bros. Pictures; Peter Roth, who is the head of the Warner Bros. television group; and Kim Williams, executive VP and chief financial officer of Warner Bros. who oversaw Otter Media, reported to Sarnoff in her position as head of Warner Bros. On April 8, 2022, she stepped down from her role upon the merger of WarnerMedia and Discovery, Inc.

In May 2024, she invested in startup women's basketball league, Unrivaled.

== Personal life ==
In 1990, Sarnoff married Richard Sarnoff, a former media executive who works in private equity. They live in New York City and have two children. She relocated to Los Angeles for her position at Warner Bros.

Sarnoff's husband's great uncle, David Sarnoff, was the long-time chairman of RCA, a pioneer of American television and radio, and was known as "The General" or "General Sarnoff". He is credited with founding NBC in 1926 and RKO Radio Pictures in 1928.

== Boards and memberships ==
- ART:21, board member (former)
- Britbox, chairman of board, 2017–present
- BritishAmerican Business, international advisory board, 2017–present
- Georgetown University, board of directors, 2018–present
- Georgetown University, McDonough School of Business, board of advisors, executive committee vice chair, 2008–present:
- Harvard Business School Women's Association of New York, board member
- HSN, Inc., board member, 2012–present
- PayPal Holdings, Inc., board member, 2017–present
- New York Public Radio, co-chair of digital task force
- The Women's Forum of New York, board of directors, vice president; Member, 2004–present
- Motion Picture & Television Fund, board member, 2022–present
- Cineworld, board member, 2023–present
- US-China Business Council, board member
- The Shed, board member

== Honors ==
- CableFAX Magazine, one of the Most Powerful Women in Cable, 2011–2018
- Harvard Business School, Inspiring Women Award, 2012
- The Women's Project Theater, Women of Achievement Award, 2017
- Georgetown University, Georgetown Media Alliance, Wall Street Alliance, Honoree, 2019
- Forbes List, 63rd among "The World’s Most Powerful Women", 2021

== Works and publications ==
- Misiaszek Sarnoff, Ann (2006). "I Do Know How She Does It". In Morgan Steiner, Leslie (ed.). Mommy Wars: Stay-at-Home and Career Moms Face Off on Their Choices, Their Lives, Their Families. New York: Random House. ISBN 978-1-588-36598-9. OCLC 430501644.
- Pham, Tiffany; Sarnoff, Ann (2018). "Crush It In Corporate Life". You Are a Mogul: How to Do the Impossible, Do It Yourself, and Do It Now. New York: Simon & Schuster. ISBN 978-1-501-19187-9. OCLC 1050872266.
