= Hampden, Massachusetts =

- Town
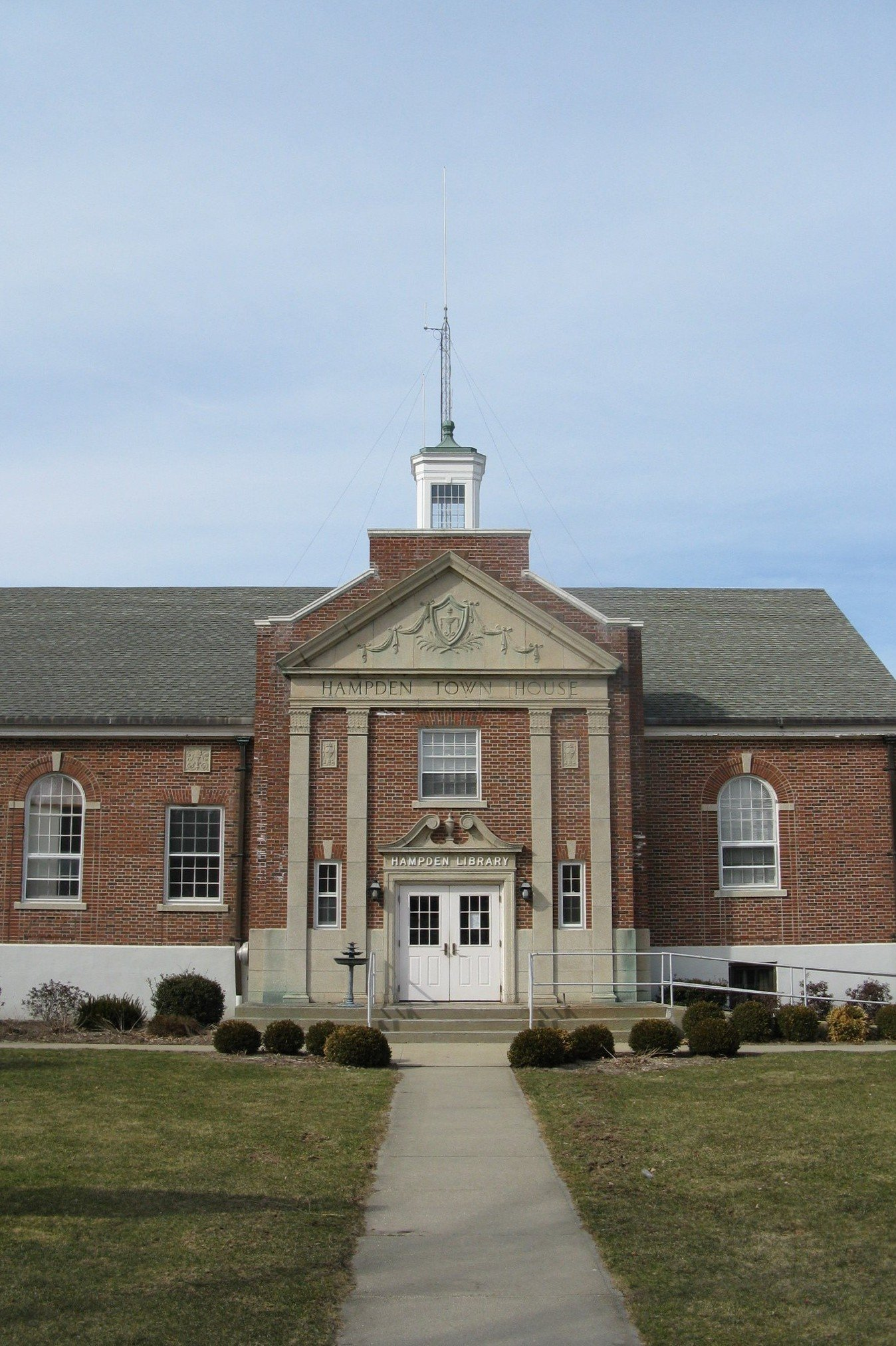
- Hampden Town House

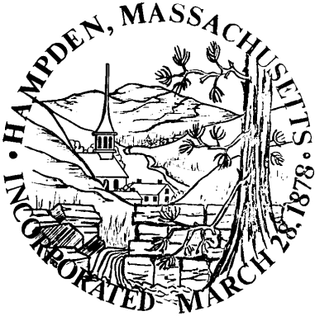
- Seal

- Location in Hampden County in Massachusetts
- Coordinates: 42°03′50″N 72°24′50″W
- Country: United States
- State: Massachusetts
- County: Hampden
- Settled: 1741
- Incorporated: March 28, 1878

Government
  - Type: Open town meeting

Area
  - Total: 19.7 sq mi (50.9 km^{2})
  - Land: 19.7 sq mi (50.9 km^{2})
  - Water: 0 sq mi (0.0 km^{2})
- Elevation: 289 ft (88 m)

Population (2020)
  - Total: 4,966
  - Density: 253/sq mi (97.6/km^{2})
- Time zone: UTC-5 (Eastern)
  - Summer (DST): UTC-4 (Eastern)
- ZIP code: 01036
- Area code: 413
- FIPS code: 25-28075
- GNIS feature ID: 0618184
- Website: http://www.hampdenma.gov/

Hampden /ˈhæmdən/ is a town in Hampden County, Massachusetts, United States. The population was 4,966 at the 2020 census. It is part of the Springfield, Massachusetts Metropolitan Statistical Area. The namesake of Hampden is John Hampden, an English patriot.

== History ==
The Hampden-Wilbraham region was once known as Minnechaug ("berry land" or "berry hill") to the Nipmuc Indians. They sold it to William Pynchon of Springfield in 1674, and the area then became known as Springfield Mountain, but it was not settled (as South Wilbraham) until about 1741. The first European settlers were the Stebbins and Hitchcock families. The first sawmill was erected on the Scantic in the vicinity of the V.F.W. building.

The "Rattlesnake Incident of 1761" is thought to have occurred on farmland in what is now Hampden on August 7 of that year, when 22-year-old Timothy Merrick was killed by a snakebite while mowing his father's field—an event immortalized by "On Springfield Mountain", among the earliest ballads ever written in North America, and the basis for the modern folk song "Rattlesnake Mountain".

The settlement was built on the banks of the Scantic River. The first grist and saw mills required the waters of the Scantic to provide them with power. Since their businesses had to be near the river, so also did the owners need to be close to their mills. So many of the earliest homes were built bordering the river or its tributaries.

During the first hundred years as South Wilbraham, Hampden was an agricultural town with Wilbraham as the "mother" town.

At the time of separation from Wilbraham in 1878, industries were becoming active in Hampden. Fires leveled some of the largest mills—the Lacowsic in 1892, the Ravine in 1904—and with the lack of marketing, other businesses failed. The advent of automobiles enabled men to find occupations outside of the town. There was then the trend back to agriculture, with many orchards developed throughout the area, with the herds of milk-producing cows, and with farmers growing their many crops.

At about this time, numerous summer type vacation homes were built for Springfield residents who vacationed in Hampden. From these, many year-round homes developed.

Now the mills and quarries, orchards and cows are almost gone, and Hampden has become a residential town.

Hampden erected one of the first World War I monuments, only months after the conclusion of the War, in January 1920, which still stands on the village green.

H.P. Lovecraft's experience traveling through Hampden inspired his 1928 supernatural horror story "The Dunwich Horror". The fictional town of Dunwich is based on Hampden and the surrounding area.

In August 1955, Hampden was hit by Hurricane Diane. Flooding was the major cause of damage; most bridges were washed away.

Since 2000, Hampden residents have acquired over 100 acres (0.40 km^{2}) of open space and park land, including the peak of Minnechaug Mountain, one of the higher hills in town. A trailhead and parking lot on South Road was created. Minnechaug Mountain trails can also be accessed from Old Coach Road, and, except for the fall Turkey Shoot season, from the VFW parking lot on Main St.

In September 2004, an arson fire hit Laughing Brook Wildlife Sanctuary (located on Main Street in Hampden). The building was dedicated to author Thornton Burgess after his death. The headquarters building was burnt down, but Burgess' original home on the property was untouched by the fire, and still stands.

After a week of rain and an extremely hard rain on the early morning of October 9, 2005, the Scantic River and many of its tributaries overflowed their banks. Many homes and businesses were flooded. The VFW bridge was washed away.

== Geography ==
According to the United States Census Bureau, the town has a total area of 19.6 square miles (51 km^{2}), of which 19.6 square miles (51 km^{2}) is land and 0.05% is water. Hampden is located at the eastern edge of the Connecticut River Valley. Hills rise up to over 1,000 feet (300 m) above sea level, from the valley elevation of 150 to 250 feet (46 to 76 m). The highest peaks are Pine Mountain and Rattlesnake Peak, both at 1,070 feet (330 m). The town has no large bodies of water, but has several brooks which eventually drain into the Connecticut River.

Hampden is located on the Connecticut border, just north of Tolland County. It is bordered on the north by Wilbraham, on the east by Monson, on the south by Stafford, Connecticut and Somers, Connecticut, and on the west by East Longmeadow. From the town's center, Hampden is 11 miles (18 km) southeast of downtown Springfield, 28 miles (45 km) north-northeast of Hartford, Connecticut and 78 miles (126 km) west-southwest of Boston.

=== Transportation ===
Hampden is one of sixteen towns in Massachusetts that has no numbered highways or state routes. Of these, half are on islands, and one is the North Shore town of Nahant. Of the remainder, Hampden is the easternmost town to have this distinction. The town does not have stoplights. The nearest state route, Route 83, misses the town by less than one-tenth of a mile. The town lies 10 miles (16 km) south of two exits of Interstate 90, and approximately 9 miles (14 km) east of Interstate 91. There are no means of mass transportation in the town. The nearest rail service is in Springfield, and the nearest national air service is at Bradley International Airport in Connecticut.

=== Climate ===
Winters are variable, sometimes fairly mild, with daytime high temperatures in the 30s, though sometimes rather cold. A record cold temperature of −40 degrees Fahrenheit (−40 °C) was recorded at the Hampden Post Office, and at other points in the village of Hampden, on an early morning in January 1960. In late July 2006, the temperature reached 100 degrees on a hot afternoon. These are the known recent extremes of temperature in Hampden. On March 14, 1995, after several snowstorms and little melting, a snow depth of 28" was recorded. However, some winters there is little snow. In the summer there are hot and humid periods, which alternate with warm and dry periods.

== Demographics ==
Historical population
Year	Pop.	±%
1880	958	—
1890	831	−13.3%
1900	782	−5.9%
1910	645	−17.5%
1920	624	−3.3%
1930	684	+9.6%
1940	1,023	+49.6%
1950	1,322	+29.2%
1960	2,345	+77.4%
1970	4,572	+95.0%
1980	4,745	+3.8%
1990	4,709	−0.8%
2000	5,171	+9.8%
2010	5,139	−0.6%
2020	4,966	−3.4%
2022*	4,915	−1.0%
* = population estimate. Source: United States Census records and Population Estimates Program data.

As of the census of 2010, there were 5,109 people, 1,887 households, and 1,467 families residing in the town. The population density was 260.7 inhabitants per square mile (100.7/km^{2}). There were 1,937 housing units at an average density of 98.82 per square mile (38.15/km^{2}). The racial makeup of the town was 96.70% White, 0.50% African American, 0.1% Native American, 1.4% Asian, 0.02% Pacific Islander, 0.40% from other races, and 1.00% from two or more races. Hispanic or Latino of any race were 1.50% of the population.

There were 1,887 households, out of which 32.1% had children under the age of 18 living with them, 66.1% were married couples living together, 7.0% had a female householder with no husband present, and 22.3% were non-families. 17.9% of all households were made up of individuals, and 9.8% had someone living alone who was 65 years of age or older. The average household size was 2.66 and the average family size was 3.01.

In the town, the population was spread out, with 23.7% under the age of 18, 4.5% from 18 to 24, 18.1% from 25 to 44, 35.3% from 45 to 64, and 18.5% who were 65 years of age or older. The median age was 47.1 years.

The median income for a household in the town was $81,130, and the median income for a family was $86,848.

According to the 2000 Census, males had a median income of $49,320 versus $30,870 for females. The per capita income for the town was $26,690. About 1.4% of families and 2.2% of the population were below the poverty line, including 1.4% of those under age 18 and 3.0% of those age 65 or over.

== Government ==
Hampden's government consists of various elected and appointed boards. There is a three-member Select Board/Board of Health, Planning Board, Conservation Committee, Board of Assessors, Park and Recreation Board, and various other boards and committees common to town governments throughout New England. Hampden's Select Board is currently composed of John Flynn, Chair, Don Davenport, who also serves as the Board of Health chair, and Erik Vanderleeden. The Town Administrator is Brian Domina.

In November 2025, the Town offices were relocated to the former TWB Middle School on Wilbraham Road. In December 2025, the Hampden Public Library completed moving to that site as well.

Voter registration and party enrollment as of October 17, 2018
Party	Number of voters	Percentage
Democratic	644	16.5%
Republican	750	19.3%
Unenrolled	2,437	62.6%
Green-Rainbow Party	63	1.6%
Total	3,894	100%

== Library ==
The Hampden Public Library opened in 1891. For a short time in 2005 and 2006, the town library and senior center were closed down after budget increases were voted for the school district within the main budget, but the existing library and senior center funding was put on a property tax increase override vote, which failed. Because of this, although residents could read and research at neighboring libraries, town residents could no longer borrow books from many libraries in other towns. The library and senior center were reopened in the summer of 2006. In fiscal year 2008, the town of Hampden spent 0.85% ($76,862) of its budget on its public library—approximately $14 per person.

== Education ==
Green Meadows Elementary School opened in 1956. In 1956, Hampden joined with the neighboring town of Wilbraham in a unified school district for grades 9–12. The two towns built Minnechaug Regional High School in Wilbraham, which opened in 1959. Thorton W. Burgess Middle School was built in 1967, and in 2018, was shut down due to decreased enrollment.

== Places of worship ==
Hampden has three churches of the following faiths: Baptist, Roman Catholic, and Federated which is the (combined United Church of Christ, Congregational and United Methodist). The Roman Catholic church is named St.Mary's. The Baptist Church is named Bethlehem Church. The Federated church is named Federated Community Church.

== Notable people ==
- Jack Arute, racing announcer and host on SiriusXM
- Thornton W. Burgess, Conservationist and Author
- Peter Fatse, professional baseball coach, assistant hitting coach for the Boston Red Sox
- Dan Haseltine, singer songwriter for the Christian rock band Jars of Clay
- Albert Payson Terhune, author and journalist

== Points of interest ==
- The former site of Laughing Brook Wildlife Sanctuary, which was home of author Thornton Burgess.
- Minnechaug Mountain: Hiking trails and nature walks on a town owned reserve. Parking at the trailhead on South Rd.
- Algonquin Trail: Also known as the old "Boy Scout Trail", or the "Ridge Trail", it traverses the town from north to south. Goes through the Minnechaug Mtn. reserve. It is fragmented in some areas, but as of 2008, it is being marked and improved, and should connect with other regional trail systems through the towns of Wilbraham, MA, and Somers, CT, sometime in the future.
- Hollow Road: A notorious, thought-to-be haunted road between Hampden and the neighboring town of Wilbraham, MA. The road is closed on the Wilbraham side.
- Rock-A-Dundee Road: An allegedly haunted road. The road has long been the setting of numerous local urban legends and ghost stories
