= Benton Whitley =

American football player (born 1999)

No. 42 – New England Patriots
- Position: Linebacker
- Roster status: Practice squad

Personal information
- Born: February 12, 1999 (age 27); Springfield, Massachusetts, U.S.
- Listed height: 6 ft 4 in (1.93 m)
- Listed weight: 255 lb (116 kg)

Career information
- High school: Minnechaug Regional (Wilbraham, Massachusetts)
- College: Holy Cross (2017–2021)
- NFL draft: 2022: undrafted

Career history
- Los Angeles Rams (2022)*; Kansas City Chiefs (2022); Minnesota Vikings (2022–2023); New York Giants (2023–2024); Arizona Cardinals (2024); Tampa Bay Buccaneers (2025)*; Cleveland Browns (2026)*; New England Patriots (2026–present)
- * Offseason or practice squad member only

Awards and highlights
- 3× First-team All-PL (2019–2021)

Career NFL statistics as of 2026
- Fumble recoveries: 1
- Pass deflections: 1
- Stats at Pro Football Reference

Benton Whitley (born February 12, 1999) is an American professional football linebacker for the New England Patriots of the National Football League (NFL). He played college football for the Holy Cross Crusaders.

== College career ==
Whitley played for the Holy Cross Crusaders for five seasons. He became a starter as a junior and used the extra year of eligibility granted to college athletes in 2020 due to the COVID-19 pandemic and returned to Holy Cross for a fifth season. Whitley finished his college career with 111 tackles, 26.5 tackles for loss, and 15.5 sacks in 42 games played.

== Professional career ==
Pre-draft measurables
Height	Weight	Arm length	Hand span	Wingspan	40-yard dash	10-yard split	20-yard split	20-yard shuttle	Three-cone drill	Vertical jump	Broad jump	Bench press
6 ft 2 5/8 in (1.90 m)	257 lb (117 kg)	34 1/2 in (0.88 m)	9 7/8 in (0.25 m)	6 ft 8 5/8 in (2.05 m)	4.80 s	1.63 s	2.69 s	4.41 s	7.19 s	33.0 in (0.84 m)	10 ft 0 in (3.05 m)	24 reps
All values from Pro Day

=== Los Angeles Rams ===
Whitley signed with the Los Angeles Rams as an undrafted free agent on April 30, 2022. He was waived by Los Angeles on August 30, and signed to the practice squad the next day.

=== Kansas City Chiefs ===
The Kansas City Chiefs signed Whitley off the Rams' practice squad to their active roster on September 21, 2022. He was waived by the Chiefs on October 12. Whitley was re-signed to the Chiefs' practice squad two days later.

=== Minnesota Vikings ===
On October 19, 2022, the Minnesota Vikings signed Whitley off the Chiefs' practice squad. He was waived by the Vikings on November 19, and re-signed to the practice squad two days later. Whitley signed a reserve/future contract with Minnesota on January 16, 2023. He was waived on August 29, and re-signed to the practice squad the next day. Whitley was elevated to the active roster on September 9, for the Week 1 game against the Tampa Bay Buccaneers.

=== New York Giants ===
On November 21, 2023, Whitley was signed by the New York Giants off of the Vikings' practice squad.

On March 15, 2024, the Giants re-signed Whitley on a one-year, $985,000 contract. He was waived on October 5, and re-signed to the practice squad.

=== Arizona Cardinals ===
On December 24, 2024, Whitley was signed by the Arizona Cardinals off the Giants' practice squad.

On August 25, 2025, Whitley was waived by the Cardinals.

=== Tampa Bay Buccaneers ===
On November 12, 2025, Whitley signed with the Tampa Bay Buccaneers' practice squad. On January 8, 2026, he signed a reserve/futures contract with the Buccaneers. He was waived by Tampa Bay on May 11.

=== Cleveland Browns ===
On June 4, 2026, Whitley signed with the Cleveland Browns. He was waived by the Browns on August 26.

=== New England Patriots ===
On September 23, 2026, Whitley signed with the New England Patriots' practice squad. On October 22, Whitley was signed to their active roster. He reverted to their practice squad the next day.
