= Lucy Chaffee Alden =

American author and educator (1836–1912)

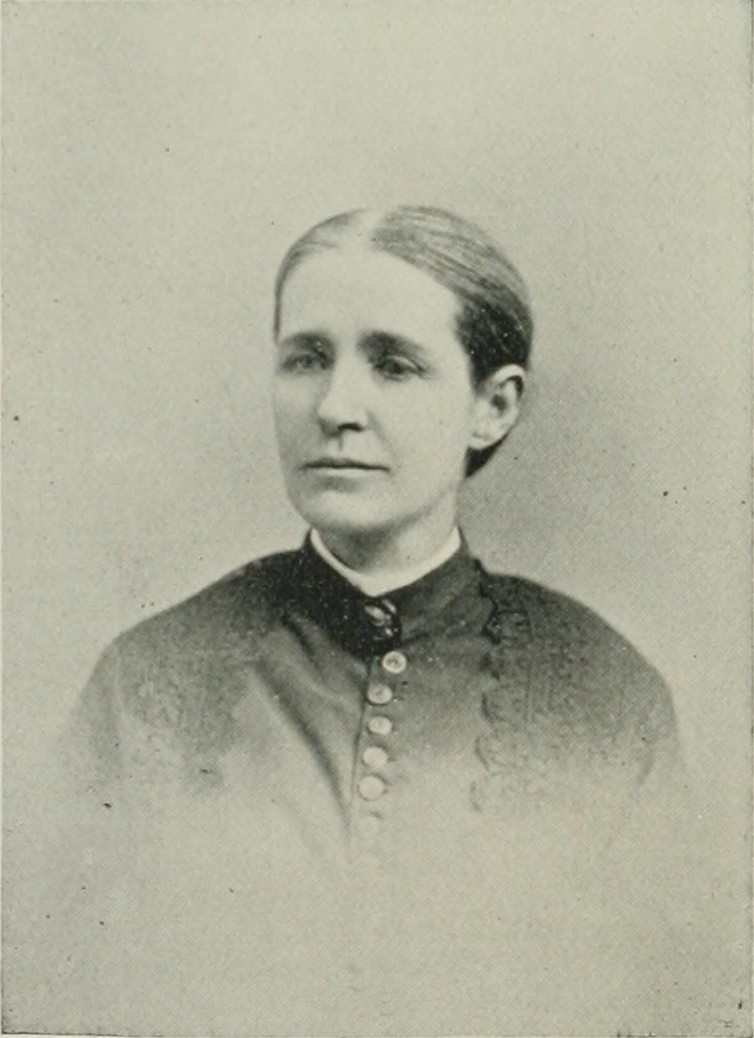
- Photo in A Woman of the Century
- Born: Lucy Morris Chaffee; November 20, 1836; South Wilbraham, New Hampden, Massachusetts, U.S.
- Died: December 20, 1912 (aged 76); Hampden, Massachusetts, U.S.
- Resting place: Old Hampden Cemetery in Hampden, Massachusetts
- Occupations: author; educator; hymnwriter
- Spouse: Lucius David Alden (m. 1890)

Lucy Chaffee Alden (née Chaffee; November 20, 1836 - December 20, 1912) was a 19th-century American author, educator, and hymnwriter of the long nineteenth century. She was born in Massachusetts and spent much of her life engaged in teaching, writing, and religious work. Over the course of her career, more than 200 of her writings appeared in newspapers, journals, and Sunday school songbooks across several major cities. In addition to her prose and poetry, she authored doctrinal pamphlets that were distributed both in the United States and abroad, including one translated into Hindi. She served as a teacher for ten years and as a member of her local school board for three years. Her published works include religious tracts, hymns, and articles, some of which were written under the auspices of regional religious associations.

== Early life and education ==
Lucy Morris Chaffee was born in South Wilbraham, New Hampden, Massachusetts, November 20, 1836. Her parents were Daniel Davis and Sarah Flynt Chaffee (d. 1884). Among her maternal ancestors was Judge John Bliss, of South Wilbraham, who on April 8, 1775, was appointed sole committee "to repair to Connecticut to request that Colony to co-operate with Massachusetts for the general defense", and who, under the constitution was chosen to the first and several succeeding senates. She had a sister, Catherine Newell Chaffee (1835-1873).

Alden spent a year at Monson Academy.

== Career ==
For 10 years, Alden taught school, and for three years, she served as a member of the school board of her native town.

Her poetic, and far more numerous, prose writings appeared in various newspapers of Springfield, Boston, Chicago, and Minneapolis, in several Sunday school songbooks, and in quarterly and monthly journals. One doctrinal pamphlet of hers was translated by a British officer and missionary in Madras into Hindi, and many copies were printed. Copies of another were voluntarily distributed by a county judge in Florida among members of his state legislature. In 1891, under an appropriation made by an association whose conferences reached from Maine to California, of a sum to be distributed among writers of meritorious articles, Alden was selected to write on behalf of Massachusetts.

== Personal life ==
In July 1890, she married Lucius David Alden (1835-1898), an early schoolmate who had relocated to the Pacific coast, but she continued to live at her father's homestead.

Lucy Morris Chaffee Alden died in Hampden, Massachusetts, December 20, 1912, aged 76, and is buried at Old Hampden Cemetery in Hampden, Massachusetts.

== Poetical quotation ==
We court the friendships thou has wrought,
The charms thy loves can lend,
Till many a form thy fruitful thought
Seems like our household friend.

== Selected works ==
- The "one hope": Ephesians 4:4, 1886
- A Letter to Ministers: An Affectionate Entreaty, 1887
- Scriptural philosophy of the atonement: what did Christ purchase?, 1887
- A criticism on an editorial in the Congregationalist, entitled Christ's view, 1888
- Letter to every Christian missionary, 1888
- The Soul, what is It? A Scripture Reply: what is the Spirit in Man?: Let the Scriptures Answer, 1888
- The doctrine of immortality: a letter to ministers, 1900

=== Hymns ===
- Comes each day the guest unbidden
- How great was thine honor, O Bethlehem
- I follow the footsteps that guide
- I would be a little pilgrim
- Jesus, Jesus, dying Lamb
- Jesus knows a child's temptations
- Lord, sing with us our hymn of praise
- Loyal to Jesus forever
- O blessed the day
- Obedient to thy sacred word
- Once more over Jordan the Master has passed
- Praise to God, glory today, All his works
- Take me, Jesus, Jesus take me
- Though the cloud that hid our Savior Lucy Morris
- To my dying child, O Master
- Up, soldiers of Jesus
