= Phillips Barry =

American academic and collector (1880–1937)

Phillips Barry (July 18, 1880, Boston, Massachusetts – August 29, 1937) was an American academic and collector of traditional ballads in New England.

Barry was educated privately before undergraduate and graduate studies at Harvard University (A.B., 1900; A.M., 1901; S.T.B., 1913) studying folklore, theology, and classical and medieval literature. After graduating, he devoted himself to "the cultural history of the Celts and American colored lithographs" and then began collecting variations of both American and Anglo-American ballads in the northeast United States. In 1930 he founded the Folk-Song Society of the Northeast. He edited and regularly contributed to the group's Bulletin, which printed twelve issues from 1930 until Barry's death in 1937. In an obituary printed in 1938, folklorist George Herzog described his theory of "communal re-creation" as a significant contribution to the study of ballads in the field:

Mr. Barry, and Professor Louise Pound, attacked the theory of "communal ballad origin" according to which ballads were supposed to have originated through improvisation, by a group acting in concert. Mar. Barry suggested instead a theory of "communal re-creation," a process according to which songs created by individuals and handed down by tradition became remodeled and changed by practically each individual who sang them. The protagonists of the communal original theory in time modified their views considerably, and emphasis has turned from theorizing to patient research.

Phillips Barry's theories have not been without criticism. In 1964, eminent folklorist Tristram Coffin criticized Barry's handling of tragic ballads "Springfield Mountain" and "Fair Charlotte" as showing "disregard of narrative obituary tradition [that is] typical of ballad scholar in general," and disputed his method in dating of the ballads.

During the summer of 1930, Helen Hartness Flanders began to correspond with Barry on the subject of an archive of traditional songs she had been collecting in Vermont for the Vermont Commission on Country Life. Initially they collaborated for the sake of finding Child Ballads in New England; at the time these songs were considered to be more prevalent in the South and were generally not associated with New England culture. Besides Flanders, Barry's contemporaries included Fannie Eckstorm, Marguerite Olney, Eloise Linscott, and Mary Winslow Smyth. Together, they collected New England songs from 1920 to 1960, documenting a fading musical tradition belonging to an bygone lifestyle. Barry's later work focused more on original ("native") American ballads rather than British ballads. His last work, published posthumously, was The Maine Woods Songster, his second volume of songs from the state. He was in the process of doing research on the ballads "The Three Sisters" and "Little Musgrave".

Barry married Kate Fairbanks Puffer of Framingham, Massachusetts in 1914 and began an association with the Ebert School in 1921. He also cultivated fruit trees, possessing at his 70-acre Prospect Hill Farm near Groton, Massachusetts, an orchard of some six hundred trees; the house dated from 1680 or before and was one of the oldest structures in town. He was a pacifist, writing in 1925: "'Let not ambition,' etc. I hope, however, to live long enough to see war appraised at its true value, namely, as murder, without even the extenuation which permits the tempering of justice with mercy in dealing with cases of individual homicide."

== Select Bibliography ==
- Barry, Phillips (1909). "Folk-music in America". Journal of American Folklore. 22 (83): 72–81. doi:10.2307/534309. JSTOR 534309.
- Barry, Phillips (1939). The Maine Woods Songster. Cambridge: Harvard University Press.
- Barry, Phillips; Eckstorm, Fannie Hardy; Smyth, Mary Winslow (1929). British Ballads from Maine. New Haven: Yale University Press. OCLC 163370217.
- Flanders, Helen Hartness; T. Coffin; B. Nettl; M. Olney; E.F. Ballard; P. Barry; G. Brown; A. Brown (1960–1965). Ancient Ballads Traditionally Sung in New England, Volumes 1-4. Philadelphia: University of Pennsylvania Press.
- Flanders, Helen Hartness; E.F. Ballard; G. Brown; P. Barry (1939). The New Green Mountain Songster: Traditional Folk Songs of Vermont. New Haven: Yale University Press.
