= Minnechaug Regional High School =

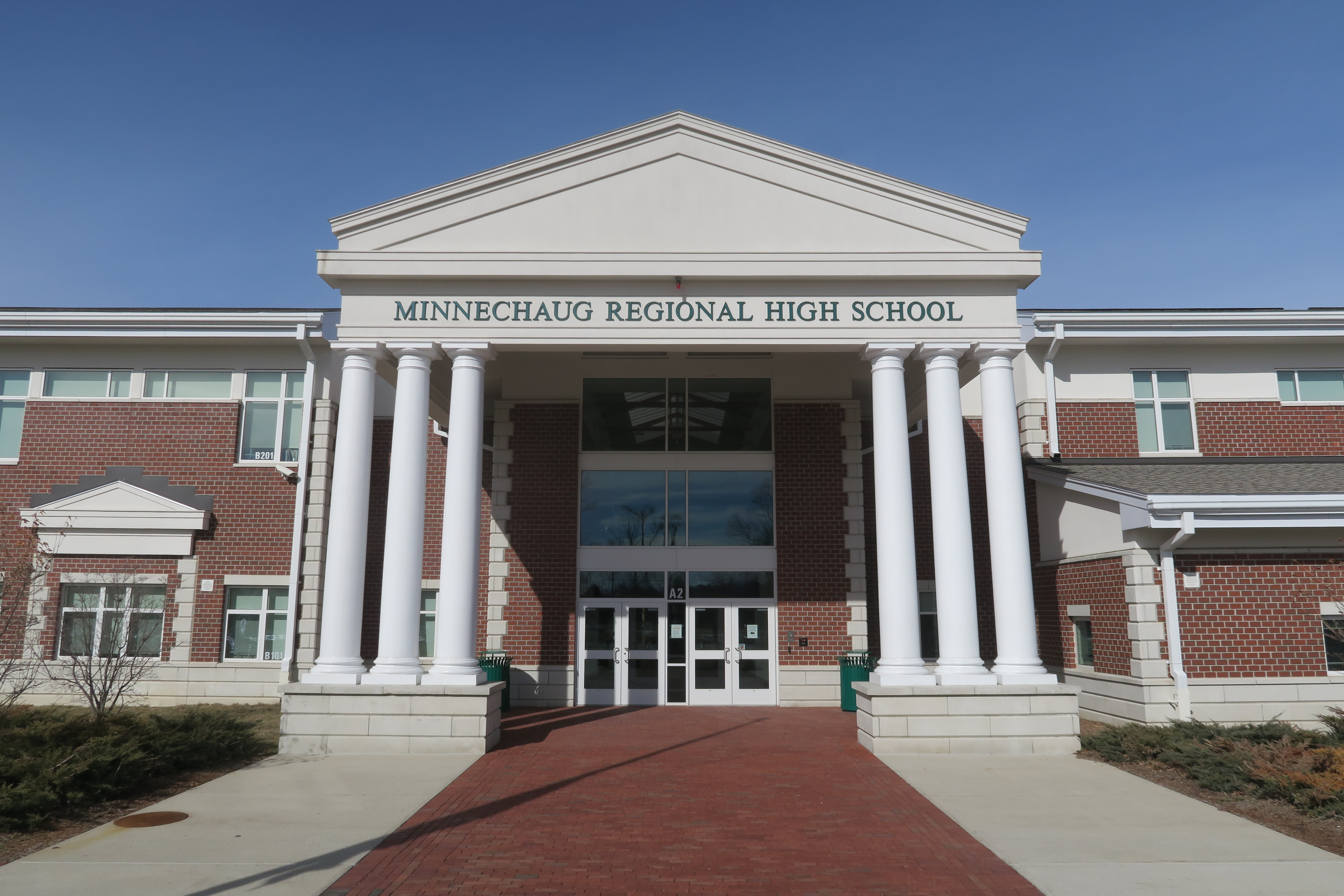

Location
- 621 Main Street; Wilbraham, Massachusetts 01095; United States
- Coordinates: 42.111287°N 72.441993°W

Information
- Type: Public; Coeducational; Open enrollment
- Established: 1959
- School district: Hampden-Wilbraham Regional School District
- Superintendent: John Provost
- Principal: Stephen Hale
- Teaching staff: 67.76 (FTE)
- Grades: 9–12
- Enrollment: 981 (2023-2024)
- Student to teacher ratio: 14.48
- Colors: Green, White, and Black
- Mascot: Falcon
- Rival: East Longmeadow
- Accreditation: NEASC
- Publication: Emeralds
- Newspaper: The Smoke Signal
- Communities served: Hampden, Wilbraham
- Website: mrhs.hwrsd.org

Minnechaug Regional High School (MRHS) is a public high school located in Wilbraham, Massachusetts, United States, and has a student population of approximately 1,200. It is the only high school in the Hampden-Wilbraham Regional School District. It serves the towns of Hampden, and Wilbraham. The current principal is Stephen Hale. The school's official colors are green and white. Its school mascot is the Falcons. The district opened the current building in 2013.

== Extracurricular activities ==
The school newspaper is called The Smoke Signal. The Student Council achieved the National Association of Student Council's highest honor, the National Gold Council of Excellence Award, every year since 2012. Roughly 70 students serve on the Student Council and dozens have been elected by peer schools to serve in regional and statewide student council positions.

== Campus ==
Circa the 2010s a new lighting system was implemented that was intended to reduce costs; it had 7,000 lights total. The system relied on software for management purposes. However the software stopped working on August 24, 2021, and after that date, the school administration was unable to turn off the lighting system. Corky Siemaszko of NBC News wrote in 2023 that this was "costing taxpayers a small fortune." The lights staying on in the event of a failure was intended to maintain security at Minnechaug Regional.

== Notable alumni ==
- Erin Crocker, race car driver
- Curtis Holdsworth, United States men's national artistic gymnastics team member
- Kelly Overton (1997), actress
- Scott Rasmussen (1974), co-founder of ESPN and founder of Rasmussen Reports
- Ann Sarnoff, CEO and Chairwoman of Warner Bros. and former President of BBC Studios America.
- Mike Trombley, MLB pitcher
- Janice E. Voss, astronaut
- Benton Whitley, NFL linebacker
