= Warner Bros. Entertainment =

American multinational film and entertainment corporation

Warner Bros. Entertainment Inc.
- Logo used since 2026 (Note: The Warner Bros. shield has been in use since 2023.)

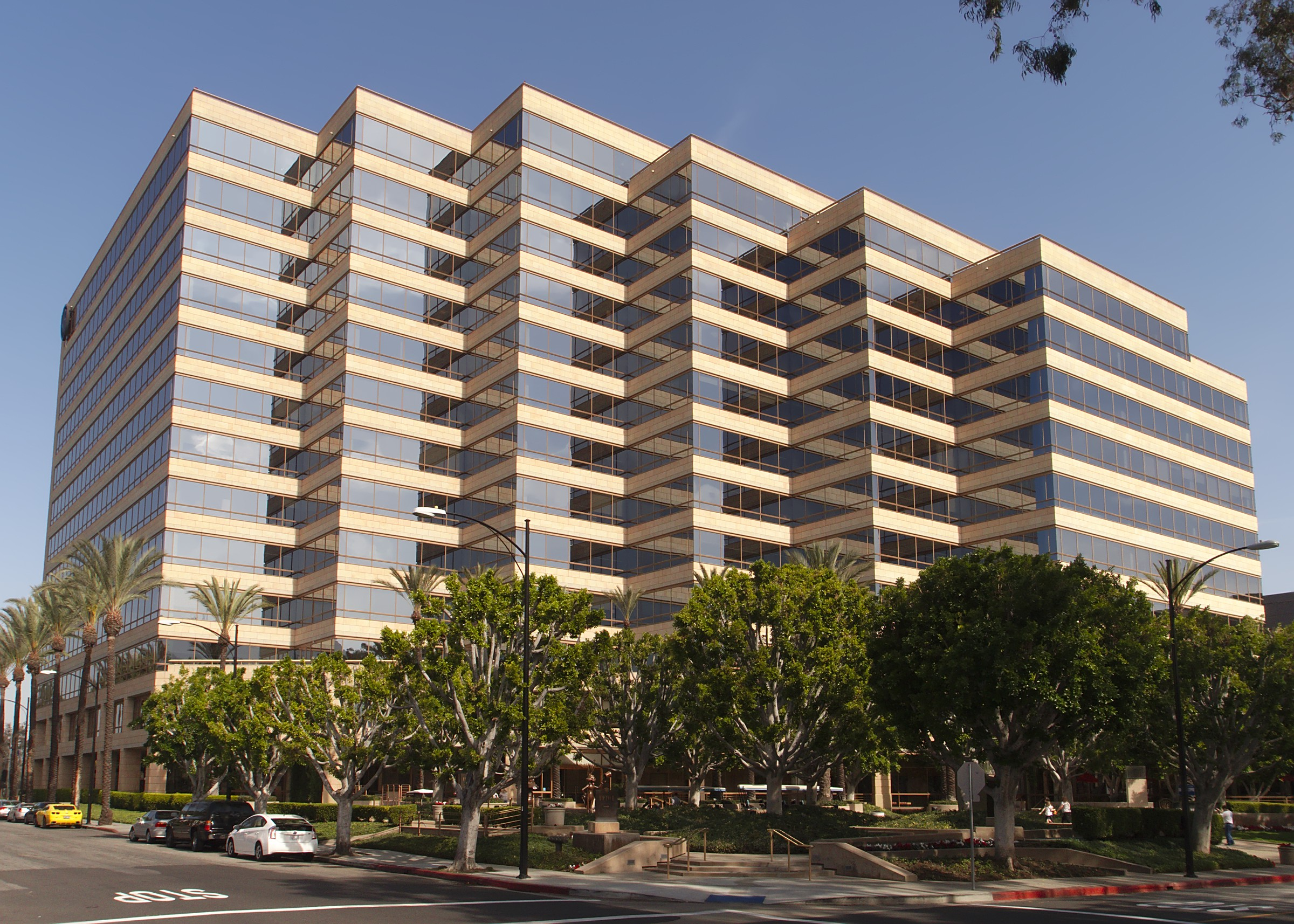
- Warner Bros.'s offices in Burbank, California
- Trade name: Warner Bros.
- Type: Subsidiary
- Industry: Entertainment
- Predecessors: Warner Bros. Pictures, Inc. (1923–1967); Warner Bros.-Seven Arts, Inc. (1967–1969); Warner Bros. Inc. (1969–2003); Warner Bros., a division of Time Warner Entertainment Company, L.P. (1992–2003) (Note: Referred to in copyright and trademark notices simply as Warner Bros.)
- Founded: April 4, 1923; 103 years ago (earliest predecessor); December 3, 2002; 23 years ago (current incorporated entity)
- Founders: Harry Warner; Albert Warner; Sam Warner; Jack L. Warner
- Headquarters: 4000 Warner Boulevard, Burbank, California, U.S.
- Area served: Worldwide
- Key people: Josh Greenstein (Co-Chair, Skydance Motion Picture Group) Dana Goldberg (Co-Chair, Skydance Motion Picture Group)
- Products: Motion pictures; Publishing; Music recordings; Television; Video games; Apparel; Collectibles; Streaming
- Brands: DC Universe; Wizarding World; The Lord of the Rings; Game of Thrones; The Matrix; Looney Tunes; Hanna-Barbera; Tom and Jerry
- Number of employees: est. 4,000 (2025)
- Parent: Skydance Motion Picture Group
- Subsidiaries: Warner Bros. Pictures; Warner Bros. Home Entertainment; New Line Cinema; Warner Bros. Clockwork; WaterTower Music; Castle Rock Entertainment (Note: Brand, trademark and back library); Spyglass Media Group (Note: Minority stake)
- Website: warnerbros.com

Warner Bros. Entertainment Inc. (WBEI), (Note: Pronounced "Warner Brothers". The abbreviated form is always used in writing, except when referring to the four Warner brothers themselves. It is never read out loud as "Warner Bros" (-BROHZ or similarly); the opening voiceover of The Lego Batman Movie (2017) alludes to this common mistake.) also commonly known as simply Warner Bros., is an American multinational entertainment corporation owned by Skydance. Headquartered at the Warner Bros. Studios complex in Burbank, California, it was formed on December 3, 2002 to incorporate the Warner Bros.-branded film and television assets of then-parent company AOL Time Warner (later known as WarnerMedia).

The main studio houses of Warner Bros. Entertainment are Warner Bros. Pictures, which along with sister studio Paramount Pictures form one of the "Big Four" major American film studios. Warner Bros. Pictures is the third oldest film studio in the United States still in operation (after Paramount Pictures and Universal Pictures, both founded in 1912), as well as the original flagship Warner Bros. brand holder and its distribution arm. It also includes New Line Cinema and Warner Bros. Clockwork.

== History ==
=== Early predecessors ===
This company is derived from the original Warner Bros. Pictures, which four brothers—Harry, Albert, Sam and Jack L. Warner—founded in 1923. The company established itself as a leader in the American film industry, before diversifying into animation, television and video games.

It was acquired by fellow film studio Seven Arts Productions in 1966 to form Warner Bros.–Seven Arts. This was itself acquired two years later in 1969 by Kinney National Company, which eventually became Time Warner.

=== Time Warner Entertainment Company ===
On June 30, 1992, Time Warner transferred most of its Warner Bros. Inc. subsidiary's assets, including the film, television production and cable businesses, into Time Warner Entertainment Company, L.P. (TWEC), a new limited partnership with Toshiba and C. Itoh & Co. where each invested US$500 million for a 6.25% share. The deal was intended to relieve debt pressure from the merger between Time Inc. and Warner Communications two years earlier.

In 1993, US West joined the partnership with a US$2.5 billion investment for a 25% share. By 1996, TWEC was owned 74.49% by Time Warner and the remainder by US West. After the 1996 acquisition of Turner Broadcasting System, its film studio Castle Rock Entertainment was transferred to TWEC in 1997.

=== Current company incarnation ===
In March 2003, AOL Time Warner regained full control of the Warner Bros. film and television production assets from TWEC and placed them in the newly formed Warner Bros. Entertainment Inc. wholly-owned subsidiary, which had been formed on December 3, 2002. TWEC retained only Time Warner Cable, which was eventually spun off.

WBEI gained Turner Entertainment Co. in 2006 and New Line Cinema in 2008, both of which originated from Turner. After the 2018 acquisition of Time Warner by AT&T, the Turner subsidiary was broken up, with cable television assets like Cartoon Network, Boomerang, Adult Swim and Turner Classic Movies transferred to WBEI on March 4, 2019. After the 2022 merger of Discovery, Inc. and WarnerMedia, Cartoon Network Studios and Hanna-Barbera Studios Europe were transferred to the Warner Bros. Television Group.

On October 6, 2026, Warner Bros. Discovery and Paramount Skydance merged to create Skydance. After the acquisition, Warner Bros. Television Group reported directly to the Skydance TV division along with CBS Studios and Paramount Television Studios.

== Subsidiaries ==
- Warner Bros. Pictures
- Warner Bros. Home Entertainment
- New Line Cinema
- Warner Bros. Clockwork
- WaterTower Music
- Castle Rock Entertainment (brand, trademark and back library)
- Spyglass Media Group (minority stake)

== Executive management ==
Chairman of the board

- Robert A. Daly (1980–1999)
- Barry Meyer (1999–2013)
- Kevin Tsujihara (2013–2019)
- Ann Sarnoff (2019–2022)

Vice chairman

- Edward A. Romano (1994–2016)

Presidents

- Terry Semel (1994–1999)

Chief executive officers

- Robert A. Daly (1980–1999)
- Barry Meyer (1999–2013)
- Kevin Tsujihara (2013–2019)
- Ann Sarnoff (2019–2022)

Chief operating officers

- Terry Semel (1982–1994)
- Barry Meyer (1994–1999)
