= Elizabeth Oakes Smith =

American poet (1806–1893)

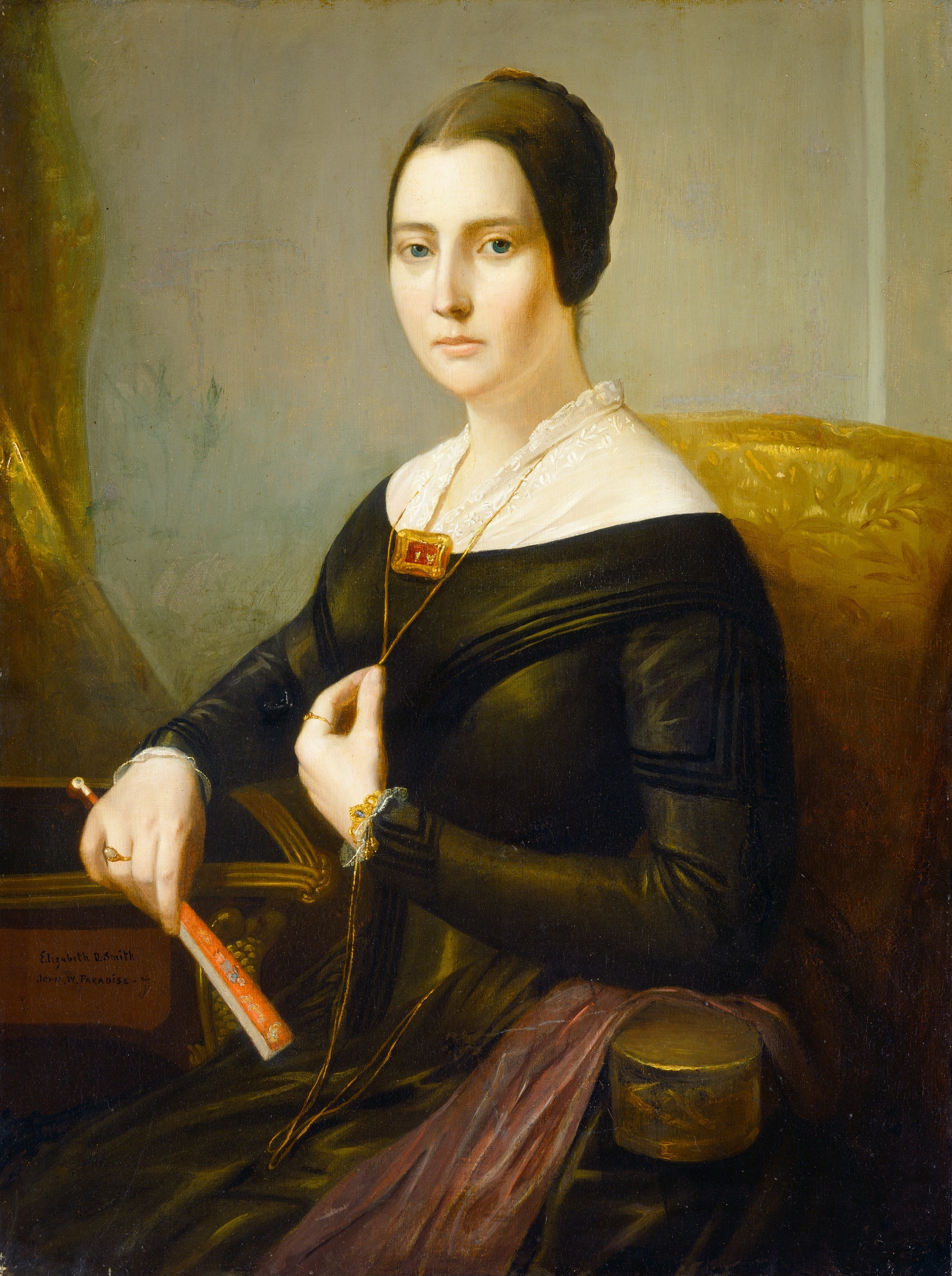
- Born: Elizabeth Oakes Prince; August 12, 1806; North Yarmouth, Maine, United States
- Died: November 16, 1893 (aged 87); Blue Point, New York, United States
- Resting place: Lakeview Cemetery, Patchogue, New York
- Spouse: Seba Smith (m. 1823-1868; his death)
- Children: 6, including Appleton

Elizabeth Oakes Smith (née Prince; August 12, 1806 – November 16, 1893) was an American poet, fiction writer, editor, lecturer, and women's rights activist whose career spanned six decades, from the 1830s to the 1880s. Most well-known at the start of her professional career for poems such as "A Corpse Going to a Ball", which appeared in The Neapolitan in 1841, and "The Sinless Child", which appeared in the Southern Literary Messenger in 1842, her reputation today rests on her feminist writings, including Woman and Her Needs, a series of essays published in the New-York Tribune between 1850 and 1851 that argued for women's spiritual and intellectual capacities as well as women's equal rights to political and economic opportunities, including the franchise and higher education.

== Biography ==
Smith was born August 12, 1806, near North Yarmouth, Maine, to David Prince and Sophia née Blanchard. After her father died at sea in 1809, her family lived with her maternal and paternal grandparents until her mother remarried and moved with her stepfather to Cape Elizabeth, Maine, then to Portland, Maine. In her autobiography (parts of which were published in the 1860s and 1880s), she recalls being a precocious student, and at age twelve taught in a Sunday School for black children. Despite her wishes to attend college like her male cousins, however, she was married in 1823 at the age of sixteen to a thirty-year-old magazine editor and later humorist, Seba Smith, best known for his “Jack Downing” series.

== Descendants and family businesses ==
Between 1824 and 1834 she bore six sons: Benjamin (1824), Rolvin (1825–1832), Appleton (1828–1887), Sidney (1830–1869), Alvin (1832–1902), and Edward (1834–1865), all of whom were known by the portmanteau last name Oaksmith (from a combination of the phonetic pronunciation of their mother's middle name, "Oakes", and their father's surname, "Smith").

Thus, for the first decade of her marriage, Smith managed a growing household, which included not only her own sons but also, at times, apprentices and printers of her husband's newspaper ventures.

What she wrote for her husband's newspaper, The Eastern Argus, or later his Portland Daily Courier, is unclear, but in her husband's absence in 1833, Smith assumed editorial responsibilities for the Courier. By the late thirties, Smith had begun to contribute regularly to the newspapers her husband edited, as well as other magazines, anonymously or over the signature "E".

== New York literary world ==
Caught up in the fever of land speculation during the 1830s, Smith's husband invested in a tract of land near Monson, Maine, known in correspondence between Smith and her husband as “Number 8.” When land values plummeted in the Panic of 1837, Smith lost much of his fortune and attempted to recover his losses by backing an invention designed to clean Sea Grass Cotton in South Carolina.

After briefly removing to Charleston, South Carolina, Smith and her husband moved their family to New York City in 1838 and began to pursue tandem literary careers. Upon their arrival, Smith and her family boarded with cousins of the Princes, Dr. Cyrus and Maria Child Weeks, but they soon moved to Brooklyn, where Smith emerged as a recognized name in the New York literary world. In their new home, both Smith and her husband contributed to literary magazines such as Godey's Lady's Book, the Snowden's Ladies' Companion, among other journals and gift books, and soon Smith published her first novel, Riches Without Wings, a children's story that appealed to victims of the Panic of 1837 with a moral message favoring spiritual over material wealth. She also penned the poem "A Corpse Going to a Ball", which became the American folk ballad "Young Charlotte" and led to the proliferation of Frozen Charlotte dolls and figurines; this poem is sometimes misattributed to her husband due to the byline "Mrs. Seba Smith" that accompanied it.

Smith received her first wide literary notice with narrative poem entitled "The Sinless Child," published serially in the Southern Literary Messenger January and February 1842, and a first edition of her collected poems, The Sinless Child and Other Poems, was published by John Keese later that year, with introductions by Keese, John Neal and Henry Theodore Tuckerman. Neal had helped launch Smith's career by publishing and reviewing her early work in The Yankee magazine (1828–1829).

Throughout the 1840s, she would continue to write poetry and fiction for other popular magazines and gift books, but she also found time for two novels, The Western Captive, which appeared in a “supplement” edition (really the model of the early paperback novel) to Park Benjamin's New World in 1842, and The Salamander, a highly allegorical story based on the history and legends of iron workers in the Ramapo Valley, in 1848.

Oakes Smith wrote what is apparently the first account by a woman of an ascent of Mount Katahdin. She reached the summit of Pamola on September 26, 1849, by way of the Avalanche. Her impression of the summit: "The view from the summit of Katahdin is indeed sublime – and though we had but a momentary and imperfect gleam, it is one to live and grow upon the memory. Mountains spread in the distance, Moosehead Lake fifty miles to the west shows its rare beauty, and Chesuncook, with its hundred isles; the Twin Lakes, whose Indian cognomen I have forgotten, and Katahdin Lake ten miles in the distance, which looked as if one might toss a pebble into it. These lakes and rivers, including the east and west branches of the Penobscot, are beautiful indeed, but solitary images, with not a vestige of civilization, and the prevailing impression from Mt. Katahdin is one of immense and desolate grandeur. The unbroken sweep of forest lies low, and the irregularities so hidden in space, that the idea of trees is lost and looks like a smooth lawn with varied and striking shades of greenness."

== Women's rights movement ==
Smith was not a member of the select group at the Seneca Falls Convention assembled to discuss the rights of women in 1848, but by that time she had for some years written occasionally on the subject of woman's social, political and economic situation. As she recorded in her autobiography, her attendance at the first National Women's Rights Convention in October, 1850 in Worcester inspired her to focus her efforts specifically on woman's rights, and she began a series of ten articles on woman's rights and capacities for Horace Greeley's New York Tribune, entitled "Woman and Her Needs" (Nov. 1850 – June 1851), published in pamphlet form by Fowler and Wells in late 1851.

In June 1851, she began lecturing publicly on the same subjects from New York and into New England, becoming the first woman to lecture regularly on the Lyceum movement circuit. "Later reformers praised Oakes Smith for opening the lyceum circuit to women". In 1852, her tours extended west to St. Louis and Chicago. In September of that year, she was nominated by a select committee to serve as President of the National Women's Rights Convention in Syracuse but was rejected for that position when she and her friend Paulina Wright Davis arrived in dresses which exposed the neck and arms.

Through the first half of the 1850s, Smith continued her work on behalf of women, expanding her lecture tours into the midwest as far as Chicago. She circulated a prospectus for a feminist journal, The Egeria, and collected several subscriptions, but she abandoned the idea when fellow activist Paulina Wright Davis began The Una in February 1853.

In 1854, she published two novels, Bertha and Lily; or the Parsonage at Beech Glen, which presented many of her woman's rights positions (sometimes drawn directly from her lectures) in the words of its title character, and The Newsboy, a novel that exposed the conditions of poverty and child labor in New York.

In addition to these extended works, both of which were reprinted in several editions, Smith edited and contributed to several of her husband's new ventures in journalism, including The Weekly Budget (1853–54) and a series of newspapers combined in the mid-1850s under the title Emerson’s Monthly and United States Magazine. In 1855, Smith and her family moved back to New York City for the first time since their arrival in the area in the late 1830s, placing a down payment of $11,000 on a home near St. Mark's Place.

In November 1858, Smith and her family purchased Emerson's Monthly, which continued for a year as The Great Republic, published by Oaksmith and company. (From this time, and perhaps earlier, her sons legally adopted the name Oaksmith.) In 1859, Smith and her husband retired to a large home in rural Patchogue, Long Island, which they named "The Willows".

== Son Appleton's arrest ==
Given the difficulties of their publishing ventures, Smith and her family's removal to Patchogue after only four years in their New York City residence seems to indicate a kind of social retrenchment, but the political upheaval of the American Civil War may have played an equal role. During the 1850s, Smith's son Appleton Oaksmith had ventured into the shipping business, eventually purchasing several ships of his own. He had also, however, involved himself in the filibuster campaigns of General William Walker in Nicaragua, actually accepting the office of secretary in Walker's new "government" and helping arrange for the supply of Walker's small military force. There is evidence that, after Walker's bid for U.S. recognition failed and his militia was ousted from the country, Appleton began to employ his ships in support of the Confederate states, at least in gun-running if not by allowing his ships to be used in the transport of slaves. In December 1861, Appleton was captured on Fire Island, New York, and arrested for equipping a ship to illegally transport slaves from Africa. With Lincoln's suspension of habeas corpus in effect, he was quickly jailed and later convicted, and the entire family was placed in a compromised political and social position. Thus, the Civil War years were especially difficult for Smith's family, who vehemently maintained Appleton's innocence.

Smith spent years seeking audiences with government officials to clear Appleton. She finally met with the President Andrew Johnson to request a pardon for her son. Johnson refused, but Appleton later received one from President Ulysses Grant. Even so, with her husband advancing in age and infirmity, she continued to write to make a living, placing her work in a variety of journals and lecturing where she could. With the nation's attention focused on the war and issues of slavery, her popularity and prominence in the cultural conversation were challenged, but in 1865 she began a series of "autobiographic notes" in Beadle's Monthly Magazine, later continued in the 1880s in The Home Journal. The autobiography was never published in complete form but is available in manuscript form at the New York Public Library.

== Later years ==
Challenged and stigmatized by Appleton's arrest and exile to London during the war, Smith experienced more misfortune as the 1860s decade came to a close with the death of her son Edward from yellow fever in 1865, the death of her now aged husband in 1868, and the death by drowning of her son Sidney in 1869. She sold her own home in Patchogue in 1870 and began living with her son Alvin in nearby Blue Point, New York, on Long Island. Four of her granddaughters (Appleton's daughters) drowned in a boating accident in 1879.

When Appleton returned to the United States in the 1870s, purchasing a property in Beaufort, North Carolina, Smith lived alternately between the two sons' homes. Undaunted by her reverses, she continued to publish poetry and articles in both popular and religious journals. In 1877, she served as pastor of The Independent Church in Canastota, New York, and she continued to attend conventions on Women's Suffrage. In January, 1879, she delivered a lecture entitled "Biology and Woman's Rights" at 11th Woman's Suffrage Convention, in Washington D.C. As fragments of her personal journal from the late 1880s demonstrate, Smith turned increasingly to a traditional religious faith in her later years. She outlived all of her immediate family, save her youngest son Alvin. By the time of her death in 1893 her fictional works had suffered the fate of all outmoded popular styles and themes, while her feminist works would have to await the renewed interest of activists and scholars in the 1970s and 80s. She was buried beside her husband Seba, and son Edward, in the Lakeview Cemetery, in Patchogue, New York.

== Archive ==
Smith's papers are in the Albert and Shirley Small Special Collections Library at the University of Virginia and include manuscripts, correspondence, diaries, scrapbooks, notebooks, and journals of Smith and her immediate family. Smith was a prolific letter-writer whose correspondents include Elizabeth Bogart, Augustus W. Corliss, Sallie Holley, and Sarah Helen Whitman.

== Writings ==
- Elizabeth Oakes Prince Smith (1846). The Poetical Writings of Elizabeth Oakes Smith. New York, New York: J. S. Redfield.
- Elizabeth Oakes Prince Smith (1851). Hints on Dress and Beauty (New York: Fowlers & Wells, 1851)
- Elizabeth Oakes Prince Smith (1994). A Human Life: Being the Autobiography of Elizabeth Oakes Smith. Atlanta, Georgia: Georgia State University.
- Woidat, Caroline, ed. (2015). The Western Captive and Other Indian Stories. Toronto: Broadview Press. ISBN 9781554811205.
