= Appleton Oaksmith =

American politician (1828–1887)

Appleton Oaksmith (March 22, 1828 – October 26, 1887) was an American politician, the son of Maine-born writers Seba Smith and Elizabeth Oakes Smith. During the American Civil War, Oaksmith was charged with outfitting a ship for slave trading and was convicted, imprisoned, and escaped. Eventually Oaksmith was pardoned by President Ulysses S. Grant. During the period when he was a fugitive from the law, he engaged in blockade-running for the Confederacy, but after his pardon he served as a North Carolina legislator, where he supported the rights of ex-slaves.

== Pre-Civil War ==
Before the Civil War, Oaksmith ventured into the shipping business, eventually purchasing several ships of his own. He had also, however, involved himself in the filibustering campaigns of William Walker in Nicaragua. Walker established himself as president of Nicaragua, and the US government officially recognized his regime. Walker made Oaksmith Minister Plenipotentiary to the United States, and Oaksmith arranged for the supply of Walker's small military force and convinced James Neal, son of writer John Neal, to travel to Nicaragua in 1856 to join the effort.

== Imprisonment and escape ==
In December 1861, Oaksmith was captured on Fire Island, New York and, with Lincoln's suspension of habeas corpus in effect, imprisoned at Fort Lafayette in New York Harbor for "the fitting out of [the Augusta] as a slaver". Subsequently, he was "indicted in the federal court in Boston for fitting out a whaling vessel called the Margaret Scott for the slave trade", and he was moved to Fort Warren in Boston Harbor and later to the Charles Street Jail in Boston. He was convicted in June 1862 of outfitting a slave ship. He escaped from the Charles Street Jail on September 11, 1862, and a reward of $300 was offered for his arrest and return. His reputation as a would-be slave trader brought "contempt" upon his family, but they vehemently maintained his innocence.

On October 20, 1862, Oaksmith arrived in Havana, Cuba, and, about October 12, 1864, he appears to have left Cuba. During this period, Oaksmith engaged in blockade-running for the Confederacy. In February 1866 he fled to England.

== Seeking a pardon, life in North Carolina ==
His mother, Elizabeth, would spend years seeking audiences with government officials to establish her son's innocence, and in 1867 she finally met with President Andrew Johnson to seek a pardon, but was unsuccessful. Oaksmith spent more than five years in exile in London, returning to the United States in 1871. On October 7, 1872, President Ulysses Grant, having "received a large number of petitions from prominent persons who believed Oaksmith was innocent," issued Oaksmith a pardon.

In 1872, Oaksmith "bought a home in North Carolina to live out his life". In 1874, he won election as an independent candidate to the state house of representatives, where "he was ardently anti-Klan and in favor of protecting the rights of ex-slaves". In 1879, four of Oaksmith's daughters died in a boating accident, and, in 1887, he died at age 59 from an illness.

== Family ==
With his first wife, Isotta Rebecchini, Oaksmith had 4 children:

- Buchanan Oaksmith (born in 1857, named after then-president James Buchanan, died in infancy)
- Elizabeth (Bessie) Oaksmith (1858–1879)
- Corrine Oaksmith (1860–1879)
- Peyton "Randolph" Oaksmith

After divorcing him, Isotta tried repeatedly to recover custody of their children.

With his second wife, Augusta Mason, Appleton had eight children:

- Theodora (1879–1960)
- Geraldine (1884–1965)
- Vincent (1882–1951)
- Eleanor (died in infancy)
- Mildred (1870–1879)
- Pauline (1872–1879)
- Katherine (died in infancy)
- Stanley (1880–1938)

Bessie, Corrine, Mildred, and Pauline all drowned on July 4, 1879, when the family's boat capsized. Appleton and his sons, Randolph and Stanley, survived the accident. His three other children were not on board.

== Sources ==
- White, Jonathan W. (2023). Shipwrecked: A True Civil War Story of Mutinies, Jailbreaks, Blockade-Running, and the Slave Trade. Lanham, Maryland: Rowman & Littlefield. The New York Times review
