= Elizabeth Bogart =

American author and poet

- Born: 1795; New York City
- Died: May 12, 1879; New York
- Occupations: writer, poet

Elizabeth Bogart (pen names, Adelaide and Estelle; 1795 – May 12, 1879) was an American author of prose and poetry from New York City. She was published in numerous periodicals including the New-York Mirror. Rare for a woman at the time, Bogart was financially independent and wrote solely for her own pleasure, not out of a need for wages. One of her most famous poems, "He came too late," tells of a woman who spurns a fickle lover who did not tend to her. Her work covers a wide range of topics, including family, nature, relationships and femininity.

== Early life ==
Bogart was born in New York City in 1795. Her father, Reverend David Schuyler Bogart, was a Columbia College graduate and Presbyterian minister with Huguenot heritage whose family had been in New York for generations. Bogart grew up in and received her education in Southampton, which at that time was an isolated town on the eastern part of Long Island. In 1813 the family moved to Hempstead Harbor, eighty miles west. It was there she began writing and later submitting her writing to publications.

== Career ==
In 1825, her poem "Stanzas" was published in the Long Island Star under the pen name "Adelaide." Soon after that, in 1826, she moved into the city of New York and began writing regularly for the New-York Mirror as "Estelle". She claimed a great love for the Muses, saying, "Without this love, my life would have been divested of half its pleasures; and without the leisure to indulge it, I think I should have felt as if time, however otherwise employed, were only wasted."

Though she wrote prose rarely, her short stories earned her several awards over the course of her life, beginning with a prize from the Memorial in Boston in 1828 for "The Effect of a Single Folly." She went on to receive awards for "The Forged Note" (1830), "Arlington House" (1844), and "The Heiress, or Romance of Life" (1849).

Bogart published a volume of her poetry in 1866, Driftings from the Stream of Life: A Collection of Fugitive Poems. She had humble expectations for the publication, writing in the foreword, "I can truly say that I do not anticipate any great success for my work, since many of those who would have taken an interest in it have gone before me to the spirit-land."

== Personal life ==
Bogart was a contemporary of writer Edgar Allan Poe, who included a short description of her in a collection of his opinions on his literary peers. He described her poetry as "noticeable for nerve, dignity, and finish" and said she had a "countenance full of vivacity and intelligence."

She was also friends with fellow writer Elizabeth Oakes Smith, and the two wrote letters frequently.

Bogart died on May 12, 1879, at the age of 84. She received a small obituary in The New York Times.

== Selected works ==
- Driftings from the Stream of Life: A Collection of Fugitive Poems (1866)
