= Seba Smith =

American humorist and writer

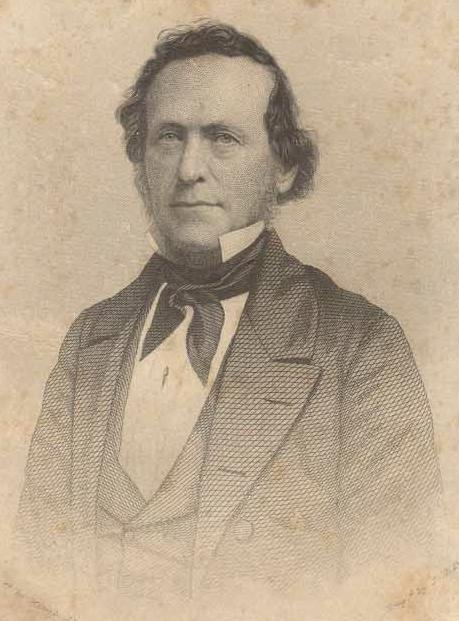
Seba Smith (1792–1868)

Seba Smith (September 14, 1792 – July 28, 1868) was an American humorist and writer. He was married to Elizabeth Oakes Smith, also a writer, and he was the father of Appleton Oaksmith.

== Biography ==
Born in Buckfield, Maine, Smith graduated from Bowdoin College in 1818 and then lived in Portland, Maine. He edited various papers, including the Eastern Argus, and founded the Portland Courier, which he edited from 1830 to 1837. Another paper he edited was The Rover, which published a story titled "My Boys and Girls", by Walt Whitman, in the April 20, 1844 issue.

He was one of the first writers to use American vernacular in humor, likely inspired by writer and critic John Neal. His series with the New England character Major Jack Downing was popular after its start in 1830.

His dry, satirical humor influenced other 19th century humorists, including Artemus Ward and Finley Peter Dunne. He is also credited as being a forerunner of other American humorists like Will Rogers.

== Major Jack Downing ==
"Congressman Crockett had taken for lodgings two rooms on the first floor of a boarding-house, where he expected to pass the winter and to have for a fellow-lodger Major Jack Downing, the only person in whom he had any confidence for information of what the Government was doing".—Congressman and former President John Quincy Adams, diary entry November 26, 1833.

The fictional character Jack Downing was created in the late 1820s during the re-emergence of national political identities represented by the Democrats and the Whigs. Smith endowed his "most consequential literary creation" with a sharp satirical wit that lampooned national political figures, delivering "astute and humorous" social observations in a simple Yankee dialect of rural New England. Major Downing's exposures were largely non-partisan, and his "simple and blunt" commentaries were widely repeated by the most notable cultural and political figures of the day. Among these were senators Henry Clay, and Stephen A. Douglas, novelist Washington Irving, and President Abraham Lincoln. Smith penned his last Jack Downing letter in 1856 in the aftermath of the Kansas-Nebraska Act (1854) and the rise of the anti-slavery Republican Party.

In one of Major Jack Downing's final incarnations, Smith provided a burlesque that mocked the efforts of pro-slavery filibusters planning the extralegal conquest of Cuba, then possessed by Spain and inhabited by hundreds of thousands of slaves. A fictional filibuster, "Captain Robb", rationalizes his actions in a piece of doggerel sung to the tune of Yankee Doodle:

Aye Cobb, but something whispers me—

A sort of inspiration—

That I’ve a right to every farm

Not under cultivation.

I'm of the "Anglo-Saxon race,"

A people known to fame, sir;

But you, what right have you to land?

Who ever heard your name, sir?

== Select publications ==
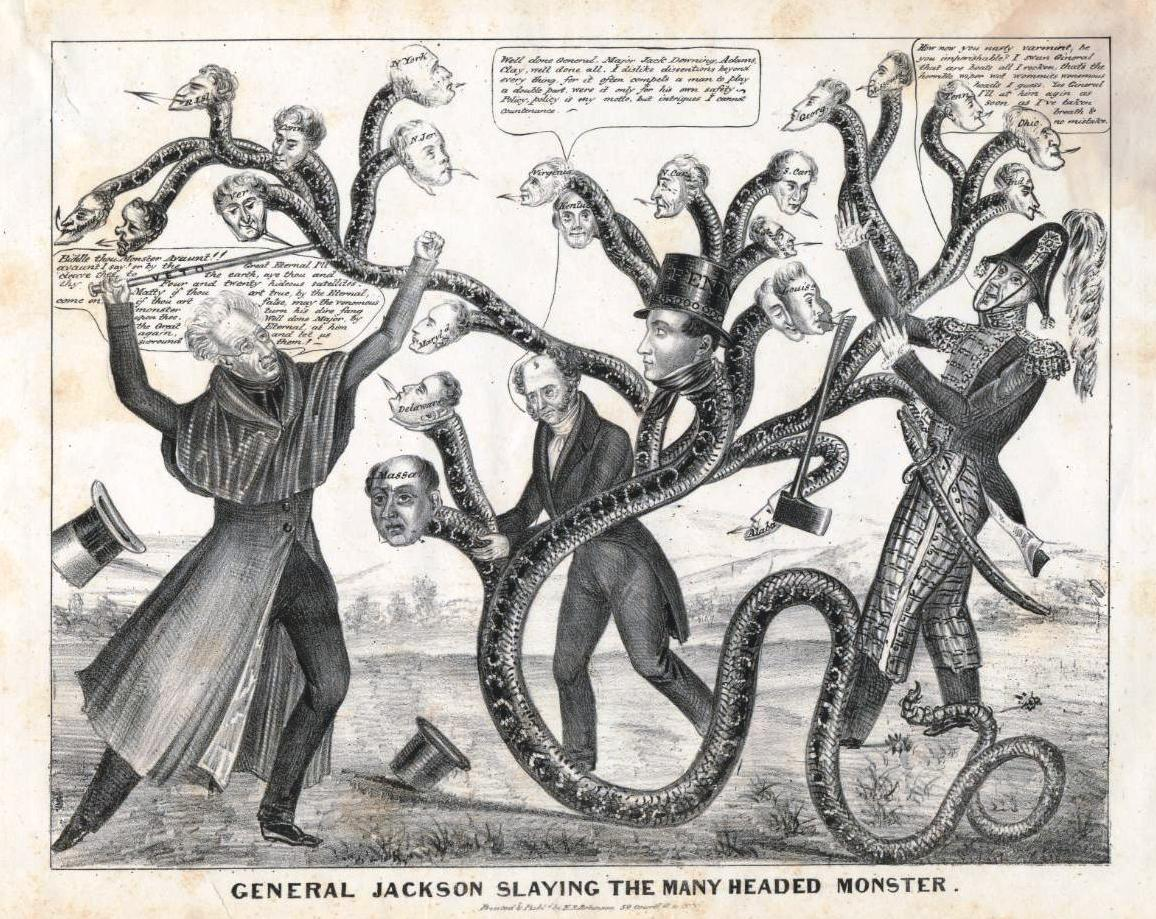
1836 political cartoon depicting Smith's Major Jack Downing alongside Andrew Jackson and Martin Van Buren

- The Life and Writings of Major Jack Downing, of Downingville, Away Down East in the State of Maine (Under pseudonym, Major Jack Downing.) (1833)
- John Smith's Letters With "Picters" to Match (1839)
- Powhatan: A Metrical Romance in Seven Cantos (1841)
- May-Day in New-York; or, House-Hunting and Moving...(Later published under the title Jack Downing's Letters.) (1845)
- Dew-Drops of the Nineteenth Century, ed. (1846)
- New Elements of Geometry (1850)
- Way Down East; or, Portraitures of Yankee Life (1854)
- My Thirty Years Out of the Senate (Under pseudonym, Major Jack Downing.) (1859)
- The Great Republic, ed. (1859)

== See also ==
- Petroleum V. Nasby

== Sources ==
- Rolde, Neil (1990). Maine: A Narrative History. Gardiner, Me: Harpswell Press. pp. 151–152. ISBN 0-88448-069-0.
- White, Jonathan W. (2023). Shipwrecked: A True Civil War Story of Mutinies, Jailbreaks, Blockade-Running, and the Slave Trade. Lanham, Maryland: Rowman & Littlefield. ISBN 978-1538175019
