= Wilbraham (CDP), Massachusetts =

Wilbraham, Massachusetts
- Census-designated place
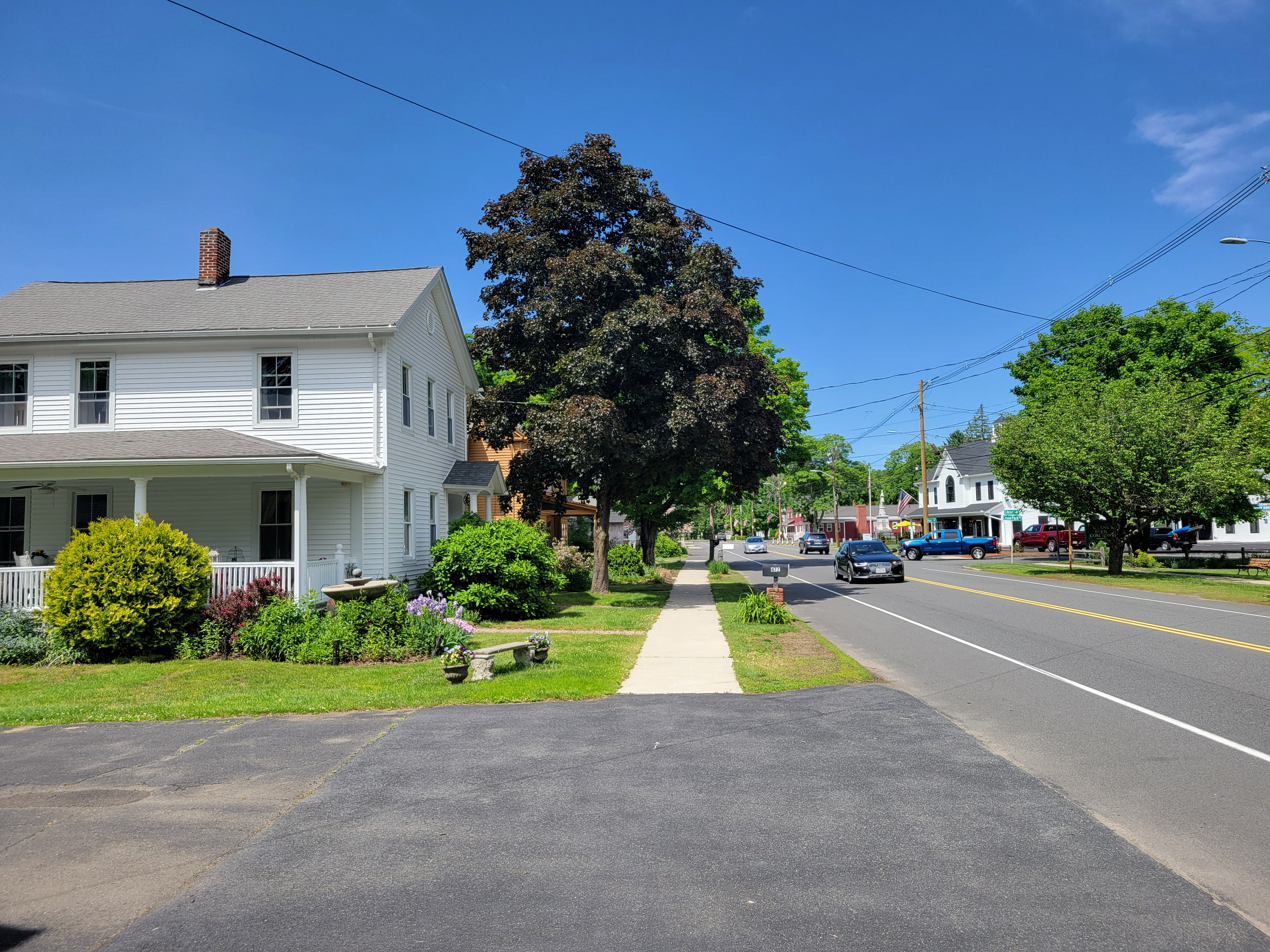
- Main Street

- Location in Hampden County in Massachusetts
- Coordinates: 42°8′26″N 72°26′8″W
- Country: United States
- State: Massachusetts
- County: Hampden
- Town: Wilbraham

Area
  - Total: 5.66 sq mi (14.65 km^{2})
  - Land: 5.59 sq mi (14.48 km^{2})
  - Water: 0.062 sq mi (0.16 km^{2})
- Elevation: 279 ft (85 m)

Population (2020)
  - Total: 4,003
  - Density: 715.8/sq mi (276.39/km^{2})
- Time zone: UTC-5 (Eastern (EST))
  - Summer (DST): UTC-4 (EDT)
- ZIP code: 01095
- Area code: 413
- FIPS code: 25-79705
- GNIS feature ID: 0609368

Wilbraham is a census-designated place (CDP) in the town of Wilbraham in Hampden County, Massachusetts, United States. The population was 3,915 at the 2010 census, out of 14,868 in the town as a whole. It is part of the Springfield, Massachusetts Metropolitan Statistical Area.

== Geography ==
The Wilbraham CDP occupies the central and north-central parts of the town, including the town center area around Main Street at Mountain Road and Springfield Street. The CDP is bordered on the north by U.S. Route 20; on the east by Mountain Road and Ridge Road, running close to the crest of the low Wilbraham Mountains; on the south by Monson Road, Hunting Lane, Ripley Street, and Springfield Street; and on the west by Stony Hill Road, Glen Drive, and Brainard Road. Wilbraham is 9 miles (14 km) east of downtown Springfield.

According to the United States Census Bureau, the CDP has a total area of 5.7 square miles (14.7 km^{2}), of which 5.6 square miles (14.5 km^{2}) are land and 0.1 square miles (0.2 km^{2}), or 1.11%, are water.

== Demographics ==
Historical population
Census	Pop.	Note	%±
2020	4,003		—
U.S. Decennial Census

As of the census of 2000, there were 3,544 people, 1,247 households, and 981 families residing in the CDP. The population density was 242.6/km^{2} (628.2/mi^{2}). There were 1,314 housing units at an average density of 90.0/km^{2} (232.9/mi^{2}). The racial makeup of the CDP was 97.12% White, 1.04% Black or African American, 0.08% Native American, 0.79% Asian, 0.08% Pacific Islander, 0.37% from other races, and 0.51% from two or more races. Hispanic or Latino of any race were 1.41% of the population.

There were 1,247 households, out of which 35.4% had children under the age of 18 living with them, 67.2% were married couples living together, 8.7% had a female householder with no husband present, and 21.3% were non-families. 18.0% of all households were made up of individuals, and 9.5% had someone living alone who was 65 years of age or older. The average household size was 2.66 and the average family size was 3.02.

In the CDP, the population was spread out, with 24.8% under the age of 18, 4.1% from 18 to 24, 22.9% from 25 to 44, 26.2% from 45 to 64, and 22.0% who were 65 years of age or older. The median age was 44 years. For every 100 females, there were 86.7 males. For every 100 females age 18 and over, there were 80.2 males.

The median income for a household in the CDP was $66,814, and the median income for a family was $71,825. Males had a median income of $60,142 versus $34,712 for females. The per capita income for the CDP was $30,686. About 0.9% of families and 2.1% of the population were below the poverty line, including 1.1% of those under age 18 and 6.4% of those age 65 or over.
