= Barry Meyer =

American television producer (born 1943)

Barry Michael Meyer
- Born: November 28, 1943 (age 82); New York City, New York, U.S.
- Education: University of Rochester, Case Western Reserve University School of Law
- Occupations: Former chairman and CEO of Warner Bros. Entertainment

Barry M. Meyer (born November 28, 1943) is an American television producer who was chairman and CEO of Warner Bros. Entertainment.

== Early life ==
Meyer was born to a Jewish family in New York City, the son of Perry Meyer and Lillian Katz Meyer.

He holds a bachelor's degree from the University of Rochester and a juris doctor from Case Western Reserve University School of Law. He is a member of the bar in New York and was admitted to the practice of law in Ohio in 1967. However, his Ohio license was suspended in 2005.

== Warner Bros. ==
Meyer joined Warner Bros. Inc. in 1971 as director of business affairs for Warner Bros. Television, following two and a half years in the legal and business affairs departments of the ABC Television Network. In 1972, Meyer was named vice president of business affairs at Warner Bros. Television. In 1978, he became executive vice president for the television division. In 1984, he was promoted to executive vice president of Warner Bros. Inc., taking charge of all of the studio's television operations.

In 1994, Meyer took on added responsibilities as chief operating officer, which included oversight of the company's general operations (including studio facilities, legal and business affairs, general administration, human resources, labor relations, strategic planning, real estate development, and government affairs), as well as all of the studio's television production and distribution operations (including Warner Bros. Television, Telepictures Productions, Warner Bros. Animation, and the domestic and international television distribution divisions). He was also an integral architect in the formation of The WB Television Network, which went on the air in January 1995. He played a similar role in the founding of The CW.

Meyer became chairman and chief executive officer of Warner Bros. on October 4, 1999, after having been the studio's executive vice president and chief operating officer since April 1994.

Under his leadership, Warner Bros. consistently ranked as one of the most profitable studios in the industry. In 2009, Warner Bros. Pictures' domestic division had its most successful year ever, and both the domestic and international division had their ninth consecutive billion dollar-plus years at the box office.

In March 2013 and December 2013 respectively, Meyer stepped down as CEO and chairman of Warner Bros., and was succeeded by Kevin Tsujihara.

== Other activities ==
Meyer often is an advisor on industry-wide production, labor and regulatory issues. He is a member of the board of councilors of the USC School of Cinema-Television, a member of the board of directors of the Motion Picture Association of America, a member of the board of the Museum of Television & Radio, a member of the Academy of Motion Picture Arts & Sciences, a member and former governor of the Academy of Television Arts & Sciences, and a member and past member of the board of the Hollywood Radio and Television Society. He has been on the Activision Blizzard board of directors since January 2014.

He is involved in numerous charitable and civic activities. He was honored with the American Jewish Committee's 2006 Dorothy and Sherrill C. Corwin Human Relations Award for his many humanitarian efforts.
