= Fannie Hardy Eckstorm =

American folklorist

Fannie Pearson Hardy Eckstorm
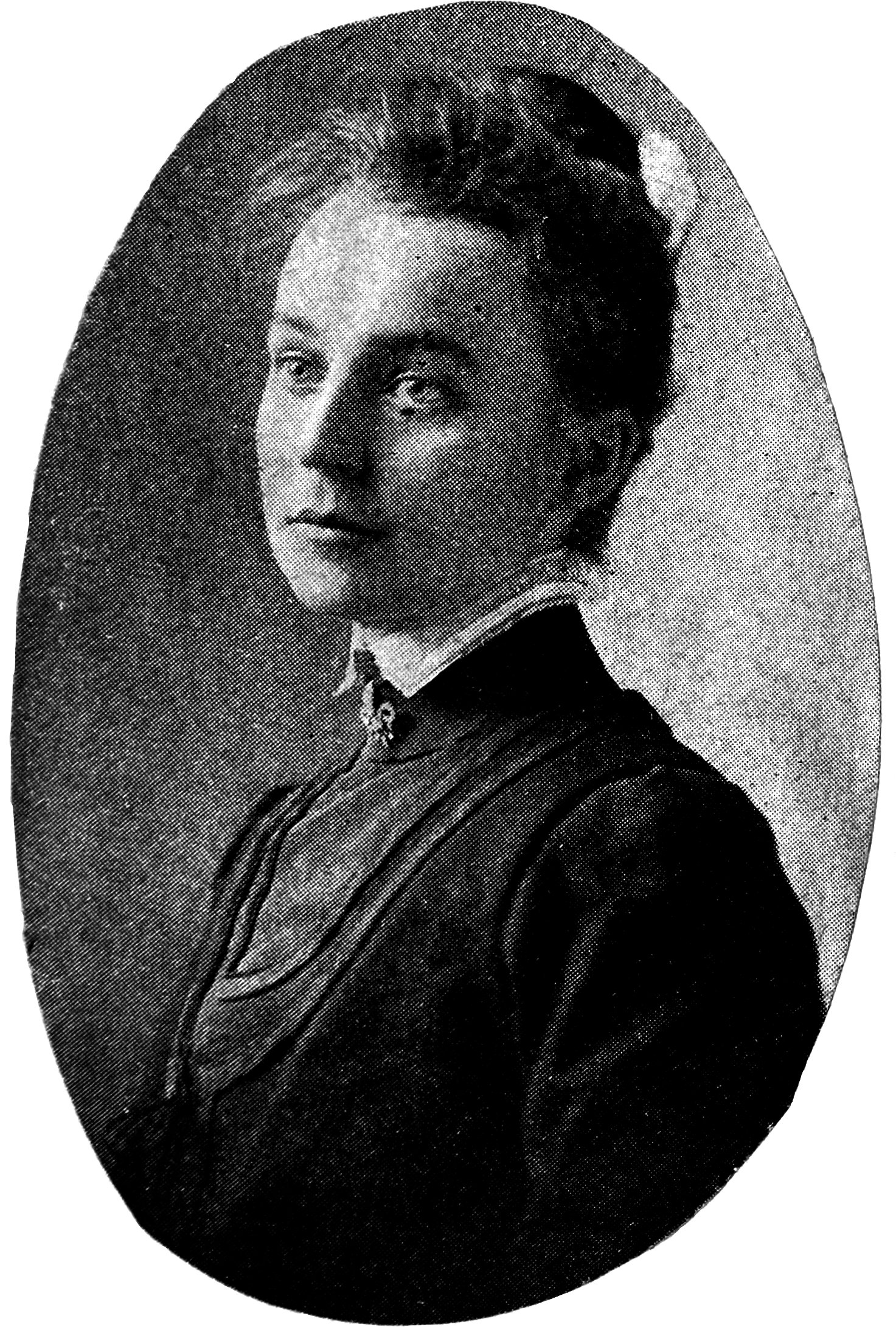
- Eckstorm in 1904
- Born: June 18, 1865; Brewer, Maine
- Died: December 31, 1946 (aged 81); Brewer, Maine
- Resting place: Oak Hill Cemetery, Brewer, Maine
- Education: Bangor High School; Abbot Academy; Smith College
- Spouse: Rev. Jacob A. Eckstorm
- Children: Katherine Hardy Eckstorm; Paul Frederick Eckstorm
- Parent(s): Manly Hardy; Emma Freeman Wheeler

Fannie Pearson Hardy Eckstorm (1865–1946) was an American writer, ornithologist and folklorist. Her extensive personal knowledge of her native state of Maine secured her place as one of the foremost authorities on the history, wildlife, cultures, and lore of the region.

== Biography ==
=== Early life and education ===
Fannie Hardy Eckstorm was born Fannie Pearson Hardy in Brewer, Maine. Her father, Manly Hardy, was a fur trader, naturalist, and taxidermist. Her granduncle was painter Jeremiah Pearson Hardy. She attended Bangor High School, then was sent in the winter of 1883 to Abbot Academy, a college preparatory school in Andover, Massachusetts. She went on to Smith College and graduated in 1888, having founded the college chapter of the National Audubon Society.

=== Career ===
From 1889 to 1891, Hardy served as the superintendent of schools in Brewer, becoming the first woman to hold such a position in Maine. In 1891 she wrote a series of articles examining Maine game laws for Forest and Stream magazine. Her times exploring the Machias Lakes Region of Maine with her father, are described in her essays from her journals.

At the turn of the 20th century, Eckstrom's writing career began to gain momentum. She contributed to magazines such as Bird-Lore, the immediate predecessor of The Audubon Magazine, and the Auk, before publishing her first two books, The Bird Book and The Woodpeckers. Her next book, The Penobscot Man, which was published in 1904, celebrates the lumbermen and river drivers that populated her childhood, and her 1907 book David Libbey: Penobscot Woodsman and River Driver creates an in-depth profile of one of those men.

The following year Eckstorm founded Brewer's public library while continuing to publish articles and critiques, most notably a review of Thoreau's Maine Woods. She also contributed to Louis C. Hatch's Maine A History (1919), published Minstrelsy of Maine (1927) with Mary Winslow Smyth, and worked on British Ballads from Maine (1929) with Smyth and Phillips Barry. Eckstorm also wrote prolifically on the language and culture of Maine's Native Americans.

== Personal life ==
In 1893, Eckstorm married Reverend Jacob A. Eckstorm of Chicago, and in that same year they moved to Eastport, Maine. The couple had two children, and later moved to Providence, Rhode Island, where Jacob Eckstorm died in 1899. Following her husband's death, Eckstorm took her children and moved back to Brewer. She died on December 31, 1946, in Brewer.

== Publications ==
- Eckstorm, Fannie Hardy (1904). The Penobscot Man. Freeport, N.Y. Books for Libraries Press: Books for Libraries Press. ISBN 0836936248. OCLC 96642.
- Eckstorm, Fannie Hardy; Libbey, David Stone (1907). David Libbey: Penobscot Woodsman and River Driver. True American types. Vol. IV. Boston: American Unitarian association. OCLC 4845207.
- Eckstrorm, Fannie Hardy; Smyth, Mary Winslow (1927). Minstrelsy of Maine: Folk-songs and Ballads of the Woods and the Coast. Boston: Houghton Mifflin. OCLC 2949695.
- Barry, Phillips; Eckstorm, Fannie Hardy; Smyth, Mary Winslow (1929). British Ballads from Maine. New Haven: Yale University Press. OCLC 163370217.
- Indian Place-Names of the Penobscot Valley and the Maine Coast. 1941.
- Eckstorm, Fannie Hardy (1945). Old John Neptune and Other Maine Indian Shamans. Portland, Maine: Southworth-Anthoensen Press. OCLC 887635.
