= On Springfield Mountain =

"(On) Springfield Mountain"
- Melody and verse to a "Molly type" variation of the ballad

Song
- Published: Late 18th or early 19th century
- Genre: Ballad, Folk song

"On Springfield Mountain" or "Springfield Mountain" (Laws G16) is an American ballad which recounts the tragic death of a young man who is bitten by a rattlesnake while mowing a field. Historically, the song refers to the death of Timothy Merrick, who was recorded to have died on August 7, 1761, in Wilbraham, Massachusetts by snakebite. It is commonly included in collections of American folksong, and is one of the earliest known American ballads.

The ballad has been cited as representative of elegiac verse tradition which later gained status as folklore throughout the United States. Due to its popularity, there exist many variations of the ballad and its narrative. Although the song is now accompanied by its own distinct melody, early performances of the ballad were sung to other airs, including "Old Hundredth" and "Merrily Danced the Quaker's Wife".

== Historical basis ==
Research efforts by several local historians have uncovered biographical and historical context surrounding the incident. Charles Merrick claimed Wilbraham, Massachusetts to be the site of the 1761 snakebite fatality. Chauncey Peck's 1913 History of Wilbraham relates that it occurred "70 to 90 rods southwest of the boy's home," placing it within current-day Hampden borders.

There exists some disagreement among folklorists with regards to the ballad's lyrics. Scholar Phillips Barry did not believe the ballad to predate 1825; Tristram Coffin later rejected this claim as short-sighted, and held that the ballad might be derived from older elegiac verse about the incident. Other authors note that no written versions were found until 1836 (or 1840, with melody).

== Variants and adaptations ==
The events related in the lyrics have been adapted outside of song, including stage performances and other ballads that include embellished details of the event. Alternative titles include "Ballad of Springfield Mountain", "The Springfield Ballad", "On Springfield Mountains", "The Pizing Sarpent", "The Pesky Sarpent", "Stuttering Song", "The Story of Timothy Mirick", and "Elegy on a/the Young Man Bitten by a Rattlesnake". In variations which feature the character Timothy Mettick, his name is occasionally spelled "Mirick" or "Myrick".

One "entirely serious" version was recorded by George Brown from Mr. Josiah S. Kennison of Townshend, Vermont, and published in Vermont Folk-Songs & Ballads in 1931.

== Lyrical variations ==
=== "Molly type" version ===
In one variation of the ballad published in Flanders's The New Green Mountain Songster and collected by C.M. Cobb, it is sung with melisma on the last syllable of each verse, which is drawn out over two nonsense diphthongs vowels. In addition, this variation features a four-bar refrain at the end of each verse. This later development of the ballad uses characters Tommy Blake and Molly Bland in place of Timothy and Sarah. Molly attempts to suck out the poison and dies in the process.

=== Woody Guthrie version ===
The song has also found popularity outside of New England folk tradition. Folk singer Woody Guthrie, who claimed his mother sang it to him as a child, covered the song with Sonny Terry, Cisco Houston, and Bess Hawes on the album Woody Guthrie Sings Folk Songs. This rendition incorporated nonsense lyrics into each verse line.

== See also ==
- Rattlesnake Mountain (song), a popular variant of the ballad.
- Fair Charlotte, another cautionary folk ballad situated in New England, about a girl who freezes to death during a sleigh-ride. The two ballads are often cited together as examples of narrative verse representative of an American obituary tradition.
