= Frozen Charlotte (doll) =

Form of china doll 1850-1920

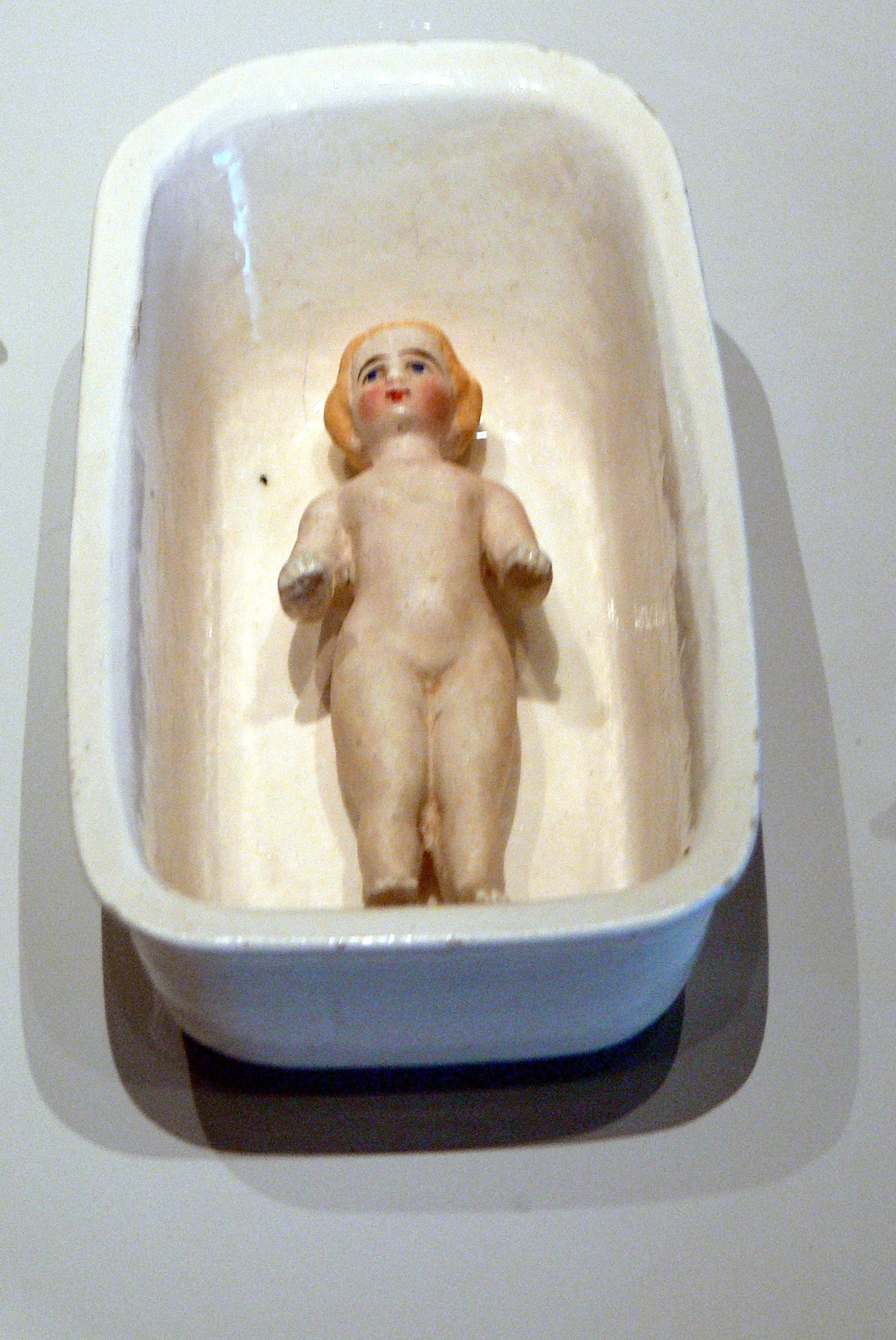
- Type: Doll
- Availability: c. 1850 – c. 1920
- Materials: Porcelain, bisque

A Frozen Charlotte is a specific form of china or bisque doll made in one solid piece without joints from c. 1850 to c. 1920. They were typically inexpensive, and the name Penny doll is also used, in particular for smallest, most affordable versions. The dolls had substantial popularity during the Victorian era.

== History ==
The name "Frozen Charlotte", which was not contemporary to the dolls' production but began being used in the 1940s, originates from the American folk ballad of Fair Charlotte, based on the poem "A Corpse Going to a Ball" by Elizabeth Oakes Smith, which tells of a young girl called Charlotte who refused to wrap up warmly to go on a sleigh ride because she did not want to cover up her pretty dress and so froze to death during the journey.

The Frozen Charlotte doll is made in the form of a standing, naked figure molded as a solid piece. The dolls are also sometimes described as "pillar dolls", "solid chinas", or "bathing babies". The dolls ranged in size from under one inch to more than 18 inches. The smallest dolls were sometimes used as charms in Christmas puddings, and smaller sizes were very popular for putting in doll's houses. Occasionally versions are seen with a glazed china front and an unglazed stoneware back. This enabled the doll to float on its back when placed in a bath. They are also made in bisque, and can come in white, pink-tinted, or, more rarely, painted black.

Frozen Charlotte dolls were popular during the late 19th and early 20th centuries in the United States. The dolls were affordable enough that children of the era could buy them with their own pocket money. Smaller versions of the dolls were also known as penny dolls, because they were often sold for a cent. Most were made in Germany.
