= Mary Winslow Smyth =

American folklorist

Mary Winslow Smyth (1873 – 1937) was an American folklorist and folksong collector of the early 20th century.

Smyth was born in Bangor, Maine on March 26, 1873. Her father was a doctor and her grandfather a professor at Bowdoin College. She was graduated from Smith College in 1895, earned her master's degree in 1897, and her Ph.D. in English from Yale University in 1905. (Note: According to MacDougall. However, Yale University gives the date of her M.A. as 1905 and lists her as still a graduate student in 1907.) She was an associate professor at Elmira College, 1922–1924.

Smyths mother was from old-line Bangor stock, and she spent summers in the insular coastal hamlet of Islesford, Maine. She began collecting folksongs independently, but soon began working with fellow folklorist Fannie Hardy Eckstorm

Smyth, with Fannie Eckstorm, created the 1927 book Minstrelsy of Maine: Folk-songs and Ballads of the Woods and the Coast. Smyth gathered folk songs from coastal areas, which constitute about half the book (Eckstorm concentrated on songs of lumberjacks and other inland people).

Smyth and Eckstorm's work came to the attention of Phillips Barry, and they invited him to collaborate. Their second book, British Ballads from Maine: The Development of Popular Songs with Texts and Airs (1929), lists Barry as an editor. While the collaboration between Smyth, Eckstorm, and Barry was fruitful and cordial, Smyth felt that Barry, although a valuable contributor, should not have been given editorial credit, and that this was done in deference to his gender and scholarly reputation.

Smyth was a successful song collector and an able researcher. She described to the Bangor Daily News the patience, persistence, and luck that she (and Eckstorm and Barry) needed in conducting fieldwork. According to Smyth, many people were surprised that anyone would be interested in their old songs, and relationships and trust had to be built over time before sources would open up. One trick Smyth employed would be to sing a song wrongly on purpose, knowing that few could maintain silence in the face of that, and would jump in with their version.

== Works ==
- Smyth, Mary Winslow (1911). Biblical Quotations in Middle English Literature Before 1350. Henry Holt & Company.
- Eckstorm, Fannie Hardy; Smyth, Mary Winslow, eds. (1927). Minstrelsy of Maine: Folk-songs and Ballads of the Woods and the Coast. Boston: Houghton Mifflin.
- Eckstorm, Fannie Hardy; Smyth, Mary Winslow; Barry, Phillips, eds. (1929). British Ballads from Maine: The Development of Popular Songs with Texts and Airs. New Haven: Yale University Press. OCLC 63370217.
- Smyth, Mary Winslow (April 1932). "Contemporary Songs and Verses About Washington". New England Quarterly. V (2): 282–292.
