= Kevin Tsujihara =

American businessman

- Born: Kevin Ken Tsujihara; October 25, 1964 (age 61); Petaluma, California, U.S.
- Education: University of Southern California; Stanford University
- Occupation: Businessman
- Spouse: Sandy Tsujihara
- Children: 2

Kevin Ken Tsujihara (born October 25, 1964) is an American businessman, and former chairman and CEO of Warner Bros. Entertainment. He succeeded Barry Meyer as CEO in March 2013, and as chairman in December 2013, having previously been president of Warner Bros. Home Entertainment. Upon assuming the role of CEO, Tsujihara became the first Asian American to run a major film studio. He resigned in 2019 due to alleged sexual misconduct revealed by leaked text messages.

== Early life ==
Kevin Tsujihara was born to Shizuo and Miyeko "Mickey" Tsujihara and grew up in Petaluma, California. He has Japanese American heritage. His family owned Empire Egg Company, a company that distributed eggs to markets across the San Francisco Bay area. Tsujihara graduated from the University of Southern California with a bachelor's degree in accounting, and subsequently earned an MBA degree from Stanford Graduate School of Business. After graduating from Stanford, he and some former classmates launched QuickTax Inc., a tax preparation company.

== Career ==
Tsujihara commenced his tenure at Warner Bros. Entertainment, Inc. in 1994, initially as director of special projects finance, in this role, he primarily managed the company's involvement with Six Flags Theme Parks, which had been acquired by Warner Bros.' parent company Time Warner (now WarnerMedia) in 1990. While employed at Warner Bros., he also focused on business development and online content. By 2005, he had risen to the position of president within the Warner Bros. Home Entertainment unit, which focuses on the home video, online distribution and video games for the company.

In January 2013, Tsujihara was named the new chief executive officer of Warner Bros. after the announcement that Barry Meyer would retire from the position on March 1, 2013. This made him the first Asian American to be the CEO of a major Hollywood studio and the fifth leader in the 90-year history of Warner Bros.

In April 2023, Tsujihara closed at $360 million growth equity fund to invest in media, entertainment and gaming companies, along with partners Alex Iosilevich and Jeff Bewkes.

=== Sexual misconduct ===
On March 6, 2019, leaked text messages showed that Kevin Tsujihara had allegedly promised auditions and acting jobs to actress Charlotte Kirk in return for sexual favours, with assistance from film mogul James Packer in September 2013. WarnerMedia initiated investigations to these allegations. On March 8, 2019, Tsujihara released a memo apologizing to his colleagues at WarnerMedia for his behavior. A statement issued by Tsujihara's attorney stated that Tsujihara "did not have a direct role in the actress being cast in any movie". Tsujihara resigned on March 18, 2019, as chairman and CEO of Warner Bros.

In September 2020 her lawyers filed a petition in the Los Angeles Superior Court to vacate a gag order that has kept her mostly silent amid the years-long battle. The petition paints a picture of Tsujihara engaging in non consensual sex. The Hollywood Reporter also revealed information about how Tsujihara and former NBCUniversal Vice Chairman Ronald Meyer colluded to cover up the real nature of their relationships with Kirk, reached settlement and court cases.

== Personal life ==
Tsujihara and his wife, Sandy, have two children. Tsujihara has sat on the board of governors of the Motion Picture & Television Fund (MPTF).
