= Rattlesnake Mountain (song) =

Song
- Genre: American folk music
- Songwriter: Traditional

"Rattlesnake Mountain" is a traditional American folk song derived from one of the earliest known American ballads, "On Springfield Mountain". It is based on the events surrounding the death by snakebite of Timothy Merrick (or Mirick) on August 7, 1761.

== Recordings ==
- Woody Guthrie on Woody Guthrie Sings Folk Songs (1940s, released 1989)
- Burl Ives on Historical America in Song (1950)
- Harry Belafonte (1953)
- Bascom Lamar Lunsford on Smoky Mountain Ballads (1953)
- Patrick Sky (1965)
- Sam Hinton on The Wandering Folksong (1966)
- Brooks Williams on Inland Sailor (1994)
- Tara Maclean for the soundtrack of the movie Inventing the Abbotts (1997)
