= Wilbraham, Massachusetts =

- Town
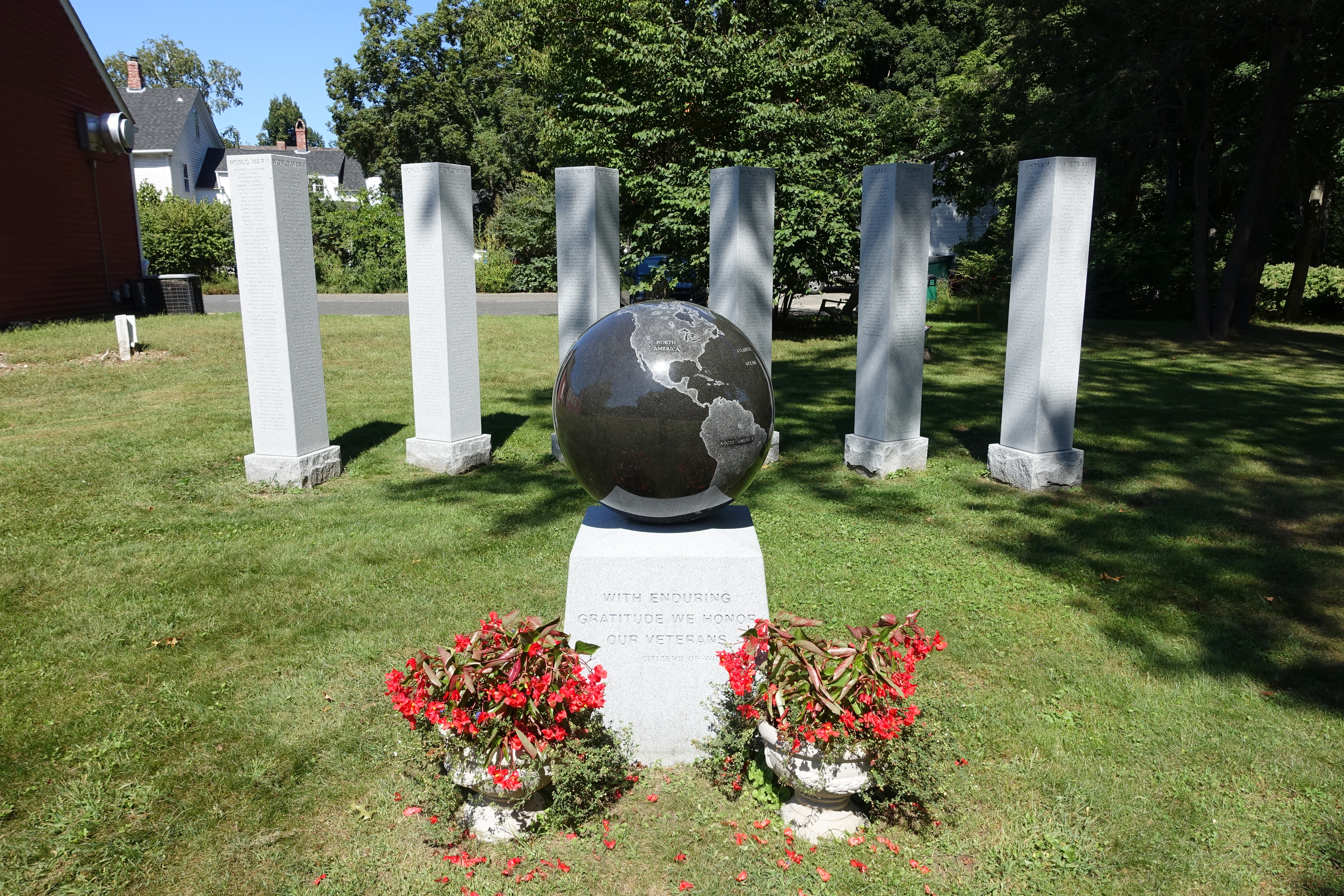
- Veteran's Memorial

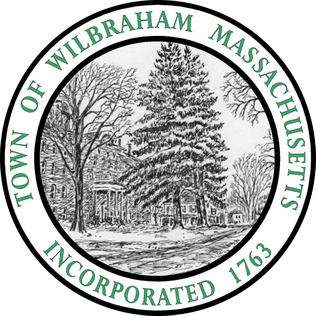
- Seal

- Location in Hampden County in Massachusetts
- Coordinates: 42°07′25″N 72°25′55″W
- Country: United States
- State: Massachusetts
- County: Hampden
- Settled: 1730
- Incorporated: June 15, 1763

Government
  - Type: Open town meeting

Area
  - Total: 22.4 sq mi (58.1 km^{2})
  - Land: 22.2 sq mi (57.5 km^{2})
  - Water: 0.19 sq mi (0.5 km^{2})
- Elevation: 289 ft (88 m)

Population (2020)
  - Total: 14,613
  - Density: 658/sq mi (254.1/km^{2})
- Time zone: UTC−5 (Eastern)
  - Summer (DST): UTC−4 (Eastern)
- ZIP Code: 01095
- Area code: 413
- FIPS code: 25-79740
- GNIS feature ID: 0619390
- Website: www.wilbraham-ma.gov

Wilbraham is a town in Hampden County, Massachusetts, United States. It is a suburb of the City of Springfield, and part of the Springfield Metropolitan Statistical Area. The population was 14,613 at the 2020 census.

Part of the town comprises the census-designated place of Wilbraham.

== Boundaries and localities ==
Wilbraham was originally divided between North Wilbraham and Wilbraham. North Wilbraham was home to the industrial side of the town, along with the Boston & Albany Railroad Line, which is still in use today. Wilbraham is home to the Wilbraham & Monson Academy.

Wilbraham is made up of several neighborhoods, known as Wilbraham Center, North Wilbraham, East Wilbraham, Wilbraham Mountain, South Wilbraham, Boston Road Corridor and the Pines Section. In 1878, the south end of Wilbraham officially broke away from Wilbraham and formed the Town of Hampden.

== Etymology ==
The name of Wilbraham comes from the villages of Little Wilbraham and Great Wilbraham, located near Cambridge, England. The name originates from Wilburgham, a name indicating "Wilburga's homestead," Wilburga being the daughter of the seventh century King Penda of the Mercians who gave her the land. In the 10th century (975 CE), it was still known as Wilburgeham; however, in the Domesday Book it is known as Wiborgham. By the 1260s, it was known as Great Wilbraham and just before that, King's Wilbraham. During the Middle Ages, the Knights Templar established a preceptory in 1226 in the villages. The manor house of Great Wilbraham was their temple and today it is still standing and is a house. Their regional headquarters was Denny Abbey in nearby Peterborough.

One statement within the Wilbraham Town History Book of 1963 states that a trustee of the Wilbraham & Monson Academy was attending Oxford University and found the following in a history book: That the two villages of Little Wilbraham and Great Wilbraham came into existence because Alfred the Great, an English King who upon hunting wild boar in a very good spot about 60 miles northeast of London, designated that spot as Wild Boar Haven. However, Haven was later changed to Ham and over the years the three separate words became combined and distorted until you had Wilbraham.

Another statement within the "Wilbraham Town History Book" of 1963 states that the name may have come from Sir Thomas Wilbraham, 3rd Baronet who was a bitter royalist and anti-Puritan. However, this has since been in doubt and the most likely explanation is that the name came from the villages in Cambridgeshire. Some of Wilbraham earliest settlers hailed from the Cambridgeshire region of England.

== North Wilbraham ==
From its beginning, the Town of Wilbraham was divided between North Wilbraham and Wilbraham, which each had its own post office. After the launch of ZIP Codes by the USPS in 1963, the ZIP Code of North Wilbraham was 01067, though this is no longer used. North Wilbraham was considered the industrialized area of town, while Wilbraham was considered the agricultural area of town. The term North Wilbraham is now rarely used by town residents and has since been replaced simply by Wilbraham.

== History ==
=== 17th and 18th centuries ===
The area today known as the Town of Wilbraham first became of interest in 1636 when a young man named William Pynchon (founder of Springfield) purchased the area from the Nipmuc starting at the Connecticut River in Springfield and extending to the foot of the Wilbraham Mountain Range by 1674. Wilbraham was first settled in 1730 by Nathaniel Hitchcock along with what is now Hampden, Massachusetts, as the Fourth District of Springfield. It was also known as the Outward Commons, Mountains or Springfield Mountain. Hitchcock built a log hut along what is now Main Street. Hunting and logging took place in the late 17th century.

The Native Americans did not maintain any villages prior to the colonials' arrival in the Outward Commons; however, they did hunt and fish along the Chicopee River as it was considered good fishing grounds. A soap stone quarry existed on Glendale Road and arrowheads can be found throughout Wilbraham. The poplar trees located along the Chicopee River made excellent canoes, and two have been found carved out along the Chicopee River over the years. The Nipmuc referred to this area as "Minnechaug" which means Berryland.

The major poem "Minneola" (1904) by Chauncey E. Peck tells, over several hundred pages, the stories of the Indians around Wilbraham. The last of which appears to have been an Indian woman named We-sha-u-gan who lived on Wigwam Hill in a wigwam for many years, "after the white man came" (History of Wilbraham, 1863).

Many town residents took part in both the French and Indian War and Revolutionary War, and at one time Wilbraham even had its own militia unit, which at one point was a field artillery battery and often supported the Hampshire Regiment. Wilbraham residents have also served in numerous wars since the French and Indian War.

Wilbraham's first church was the First Congregational Church, which was organized on June 24, 1741. This church would later merge into the Wilbraham United Church. The first minister of the town was Mr. Noah Merrick. The first three selectmen were Lieutenant Thomas Mirick, Deacon Nathaniel Warriner and Stephen Stebbins. Stebbins was the first person to settle in the southern part of the precinct in modern-day Hampden when he built a house on the north side of the Scantic River in 1741.

After many years of submitting petitions to the Massachusetts General Court the town was officially incorporated as the independent "Wilbraham" in 1763, when its population was about 400. Wilbraham was made a separate town because of the walking distance to Springfield, along with differing interests made the people of the fourth precinct petition several times for a new town to be incorporated.

On August 7, 1761, on Wilbraham Mountain, a young man named Timothy Merrick was bitten by a rattlesnake and died soon afterward. Folklore and legend have made its way over the years about this incident including a song titled "On Springfield Mountain". The incident probably took place within what is now the adjoining town of Hampden, but at the time was still part of South Wilbraham—though some have claimed it was as far south as Connecticut. This song was one of the earliest of the American ballads.

The Bay Path trail once ran through the north end of the town. It was this trail that Henry Knox used when he moved the cannons that he captured at Fort Ticonderoga in 1775. These cannons were brought to Boston (being pulled by oxen) and placed on Dorchester Heights and used against the British. Knox led the artillery train through the town.

The first President of the United States, General George Washington, traveled through the town twice and on one occasion slept at a home along the Bay Path in 1790 while on his way to and from Boston.

On April 29, 1799, a tragedy on Nine Mile Pond took the lives of six people, including three 16-year-old girls. The boat that they were traveling in overturned. One of the victims was not found for sixteen days and a ditch had to be dug in order to drain the pond to find her. This ditch located across the street on Boston Rd became the first town dump.

=== 19th century ===
The Underground Railroad ran through the town and several houses along Main Street and on Wilbraham Mountain served as stations. The Wilbraham town center is among the largest designated historical areas in the country, with fine examples of colonial and Victorian homes from as early as the 1730s along the historical areas of Main Street. The oldest Methodist meeting house in New England is located in the town's center, as is the campus of Wilbraham & Monson Academy, founded in 1804.

North Wilbraham was the industrialized area of the town and was home to the Collins Manufacturing Company and other businesses. The Collins Manufacturing Company was once the main employer of the town. The building, also known as the Collins Paper Mill (which still stands today), was built c. 1872. It made fine writing paper and, for a short time, made government currency paper. The mill officially closed down in 1940, but some sections continued operating into the 1950s. A fire in 1945 did severe damage to the building, which is now home to several small businesses.

Wilbraham at one time was very famous for its peach orchards and some are still grown on the slope of the Wilbraham Mountain Range. Apples were also grown on the slopes.

=== 20th century ===
Wilbraham Center was the farming area of town and was home to Bennett's Turkey Farm, Pheasant Farm and Rice's Fruit Farm which grew the peaches later celebrated during the Peach Festival. Wilbraham had several potato farms in the south end of town around the time of World War II. None of those farms remain in operation today. Wilbraham was once the home of a speakeasy called "Worlds End" on Burleigh Road. It was destroyed by a fire in the mid-1930s.

In the summer of 1928, author H. P. Lovecraft stayed with the teacher and antiquarian Miss Evanore O. Beebe (co-author of the 1913 Wilbraham History Book) at her farmhouse on Monson Road in west Wilbraham, touring the locality with his friend and author Mrs Miniter who was a local. He later modeled the fictional town of Dunwich on the combination of towns in the area, in his story "The Dunwich Horror". He also used the area's folklore in the story. After his death Lovecraft's executor August Derleth later wrote the story "The Peabody Heritage", set in Wilbraham. Evanore Beebe died in 1935.

The hurricane of 1938 did considerable damage to the town and destroyed the old covered bridge over the Chicopee River on Cottage Ave. A steel bridge rests there today.

During World War I, the town suffered the loss of George M. Kingdon who died fighting in France. He was Wilbraham's only casualty. When the Wilbraham Fire Department was incorporated in 1919 it was named the George M. Kingdon Fire Company in his honor.

The flood of 1955 washed out many of the roads in the town. The dam near the Chicopee River gave way washing out the railroad tracks as well as parts of Mountain Road and Boston Road.

=== 21st century ===
On the afternoon of June 1, 2011, two tornadoes struck Wilbraham: an EF-1 and an EF-3. The EF-3, which originated in Westfield and traveled through West Springfield and Springfield, caused extensive damage to the Tinkham Road corridor of the town. Heavy structural damage to homes, power poles, and trees was experienced. That tornado then moved eastward to cause extensive damage to the towns of Monson, Brimfield and Sturbridge. The EF-1 formed after the EF-3 and primarily caused damage to power poles and trees along a section from Stony Hill Road east crossing Main Street, just south of St. Cecilia's Church to Crane Hill Road.

== Commercial ==
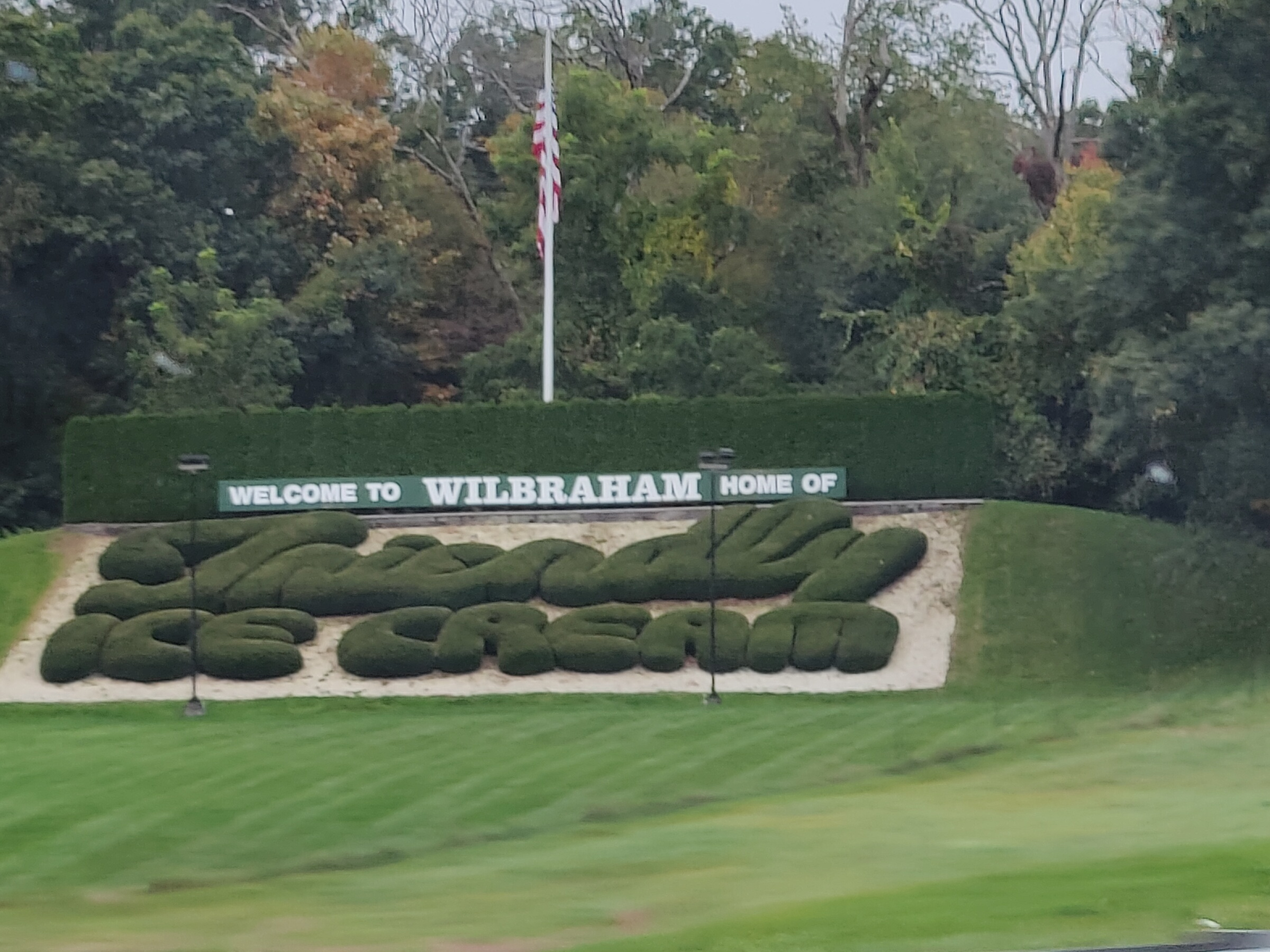
"Home of Friendly Ice Cream" hedges visible while heading westbound on the Mass Pike

The corporate headquarters of Friendly's Ice Cream was formerly located in Wilbraham. On the Massachusetts Turnpike, hedges along the side of the highway have a sign and have been trimmed to read "Welcome to Wilbraham, Home of Friendly Ice Cream". Friendly's Ice Cream was acquired in 2016 by Dean Foods. The Dean Foods bankruptcy settlement sold Friendly's Ice Cream to Amici Partners Group.

Bennett Turkey Farms was acquired by Rice's Fruit Farm in 2007. Rice's Fruit Farm which first opened in 1894 is a historic New England family run farm stand serving Breakfast, Coffee, Pies, Apples and Ice Cream.

Flo Design Sonics, a technology company, located at 380 Main St., was acquired by Millipore Sigma in 2019. Flo Design Wind Turbines is co-located here.

== Town government ==
Wilbraham has a Selectboard in which there are three members, each serving a three-year term. The town has an open town meeting rule and an annual town meeting is held every spring.

== Education ==
Wilbraham has a regional School District, called the Hampden-Wilbraham Regional School District which is centered around Minnechaug Regional High School.

Wilbraham & Monson Academy, a private middle and high school with an international student population, is located in the downtown.

== Geography ==
According to the United States Census Bureau, the town has a total area of 22.4 square miles (58.1 km^{2}), of which 22.2 square miles (57.5 km^{2}) is land and 0.2 square mile (0.5 km^{2}) (0.89%) is water. Wilbraham is bordered by Springfield on the west, Ludlow on the north, Palmer on the northeast, Monson on the east, Hampden on the south, and East Longmeadow on the southwest.

Wilbraham is situated in such a way that its area lies within two broad physiographic provinces that cross Massachusetts from north to south. The Wilbraham Mountains which dominate the geography of the town are part of the Central Upland of Massachusetts, while the portion of town west of the mountains lies within the Connecticut Valley Lowland. Millions of years ago, the flat area of Wilbraham west of the mountains were once part of a shallow inland sea.

Wilbraham also has the Wilbraham Mountains range, which starts at the north end of town and extends into Hampden. The highest point in town is Mt. Chapin at 937 feet above sea level. Other high peaks are Mount Vision (formerly Rattlesnake Peak) and Wigwam Hill.

== Demographics ==
Historical population
Year	Pop.	±%
1790	1,555	—
1850	2,127	+36.8%
1860	2,081	−2.2%
1870	2,330	+12.0%
1880	1,628	−30.1%
1890	1,814	+11.4%
1900	1,595	−12.1%
1910	2,332	+46.2%
1920	2,780	+19.2%
1930	2,719	−2.2%
1940	3,041	+11.8%
1950	4,003	+31.6%
1960	7,387	+84.5%
1970	11,984	+62.2%
1980	12,053	+0.6%
1990	12,635	+4.8%
2000	13,473	+6.6%
2010	14,219	+5.5%
2020	14,613	+2.8%
2022*	14,526	−0.6%
* = population estimate.

As of the census of 2000, there were 13,473 people, 4,891 households, and 3,873 families residing in the town. The population density was 606.3 inhabitants per square mile (234.1/km^{2}). There were 5,048 housing units at an average density of 227.2 per square mile (87.7/km^{2}). The racial makeup of the town was 96.40% White, 1.19% Black or African American, 0.06% Native American, 1.26% Asian, 0.06% Pacific Islander, 0.25% from other races, and 0.77% from two or more races. Hispanic or Latino of any race were 1.40% of the population.

There were 4,891 households, out of which 37.2% had children under the age of 18 living with them, 68.7% were married couples living together, 8.0% had a female householder with no husband present, and 20.8% were non-families. 17.9% of all households were made up of individuals, and 10.4% had someone living alone who was 65 years of age or older. The average household size was 2.71 and the average family size was 3.09.

In the town, the population was spread out, with 26.9% under the age of 18, 4.3% from 18 to 24, 24.4%from 25 to 44, 27.6% from 45 to 64, and 16.9% who were 65 years of age or older. The median age was 42 years. For every 100 females, there were 92.5 males. For every 100 females age 18 and over, there were 88.3 males.

The median income for a household in the town was $65,014, and the median income for a family was $73,825. Males had a median income of $55,600 versus $36,922 for females. The per capita income for the town was $29,854. About 3.2% of families and 5.1% of the population were below the poverty line, including 5.5% of those under age 18 and 9.0% of those age 65 or over.

== Notable people ==
- Lucy Morris Chaffee Alden, author, educator and hymn writer
- Erin Crocker, former auto racer
- Bill Guerin, former hockey player and hockey general manager.
- Raymond Kennedy, novelist
- Samuel Leech, author
- Alexandra Lydon, actress
- Jeff Maconi, ARCA Menards Series driver
- Hazel E. Munsell, chemist and educator
- Kelly Overton, actress
- Charles Pratt, businessman and founder of Pratt Institute
- Dean Rosenthal, composer
- Ann Sarnoff, television executive
- Mike Stefanik, former auto racer and NASCAR Hall of Famer
- Mike Trombley, baseball player
