= Fair Charlotte =

American folk ballad

"Fair Charlotte" (or "Young Charlotte") (Laws G17) is an American folk ballad.

== Story ==
The story is a cautionary tale concerning a young girl called Charlotte who refused to wrap up warmly to go on a sleigh ride to a New Year's ball. Upon arriving at the ball, her fiancé discovers that she has frozen to death during the journey.

== Origins ==
The earliest known form of the story is in a purported incident recounted in The New York Observer in 1840, entitled "A Corpse Going to a Ball"; this was reprinted in The Ohio Democrat and Dover Advertiser for February 28, 1840. The report claimed that the incident in question happened on January 1, 1840, and likened it to a story called "Death at the Toilet" from Passages from the Diary of a London Physician (1838), which tells of a young woman who is determined to go a ball despite the fact that she suffers from heart problems; because of cold weather in her room she is found dead at her toilet while primping herself for the ball. The moral of the story is against vanity: "...I have seen many hundreds of corpses, as well in the calm composure of natural death, as mangled and distorted by violence; but never have I seen so startling a satire upon human vanity, so repulsive, unsightly, and loathsome a spectacle as a corpse dressed for a ball!." Other Newspapers that reprinted "" were the "Vermont Telegraph" (February 19, 1840) and "Southern Argus" March 3, 1840 of Columbus Mississippi. There was also a follow-up article April 1, 1840.

American poet and suffragist Elizabeth Oakes Smith turned this story into a poem, published in The Neapolitan, a newspaper of Naples, New York, on January 27, 1841, also under the title "A Corpse Going to a Ball". A version of Smith's poem was subsequently set to music, leading to the creation of the ballad. During the 20th century, a version of the ballad was sung by Almeda Riddle under the title "Young Carlotta".

== See also ==
- Springfield Mountain, another cautionary folk ballad situated in New England, about a boy who is bitten by a rattlesnake. The two ballads are often cited together as examples of narrative verse representative of obituary tradition.
- Frozen Charlotte, a type of porcelain doll named after the ballad.
