= List of Saturday Night Live guests (I–L) =

The following is a list of people who have been guests on Saturday Night Live. This section consists of people who fall between the letters I and L.

The list below shows the people who have appeared on the show. It is split into three sections: Host, if the person hosted the show at any given time; Musical guest, if a person was the musical guest on the show at any given time; and Cameo, which is for a person who has appeared on the show but did not act as host or musical guest at any given time.

== I ==
Performer	Host	Musical guest	Cameo
Janis Ian		✓	
Vanilla Ice		✓	
Ice Spice		✓	
Ice-T			✓
Eric Idle	✓		✓
Billy Idol		✓	
Imagine Dragons		✓	
Natalie Imbruglia		✓	
India.Arie		✓	
Neil Innes		✓	✓
Jeremy Irons	✓		
Bill Irwin			✓
Oscar Isaac	✓		✓
Chris Isaak		✓	

== J ==
Performer	Host	Musical guest	Cameo
J-Kwon		✓	
The J. Geils Band		✓	
Ja Rule		✓	
Jabbawockeez		✓	
Jack Bruce and Friends		✓	
Hugh Jackman	✓		✓
Janet Jackson	✓	✓	
Jesse Jackson	✓		✓
Joe Jackson		✓	
Kate Jackson	✓		
Samuel L. Jackson	✓		✓
Eric Jacobson			✓
Mick Jagger	✓	✓	✓
Jaheim			✓
Pearl Jam		✓	
LeBron James	✓		
Rick James		✓	
Jamiroquai		✓	
Jane's Addiction		✓	
Allison Janney			✓
Al Jarreau		✓	
Keith Jarrett		✓	
Ricky Jay			✓
Jay-Z		✓	✓
Gregg Jefferies			✓
Jelly Roll		✓	
Kris Jenner			✓
Waylon Jennings			✓
Carly Rae Jepsen		✓	
Jeremih			✓
Jesse Dixon Singers			✓
Jessie J		✓	
Jet		✓	
Derek Jeter	✓		✓
Jewel		✓	
Richard Jewell			✓
Flaco Jiménez			✓
Jimmy Eat World		✓	
Joe			✓
Joe King Carrasco and The Crowns		✓	
Billy Joel		✓	
Scarlett Johansson	✓		✓
Elton John	✓	✓	
Johnny Clegg and Savuka		✓	
Beverly Johnson			✓
Dakota Johnson	✓		✓
Don Johnson			✓
Howard Johnson			✓
Jack Johnson		✓	✓
Punkie Johnson			✓
Shari Johnson-Jefferson			✓
Jonas Brothers		✓	
Nick Jonas	✓	✓	
Kevin Jonas			✓
Chipper Jones			✓
Felicity Jones	✓		
Janet Jones			✓
January Jones	✓		
Leslie Jones			✓
Norah Jones		✓	
Quincy Jones	✓	✓	
Quincy Jones III		✓	
Rashida Jones			✓
Rickie Lee Jones		✓	
Sharon Jones			✓
Steve Jones			✓
Terry Jones			✓
Michael Jonzun			✓
Michael Jordan	✓		
Michael B. Jordan	✓		✓
Steve Jordan			✓
John Joseph			✓
Colin Jost			✓
Mike Judge			✓
Junior Walker		✓	

== K ==
Performer	Host	Musical guest	Cameo
k.d. lang and The Reclines		✓	
Noah Kahan		✓	
Madeline Kahn	✓		
Paula Kahn			✓
Tim Kaine			✓
Mindy Kaling			✓
Daniel Kaluuya	✓		✓
Khloé Kardashian			✓
Kim Kardashian	✓		
Alex Karras	✓		
Karmin		✓	
Casey Kasem			✓
Katseye		✓	
Chris Kattan			✓
Andy Kaufman			✓
Ke$ha		✓	
Stacy Keach			✓
Keane		✓	
Michael Keaton	✓		✓
Steven Keats			✓
Katell Keineg			✓
Harvey Keitel	✓		✓
Donna Kelce			✓
Ed Kelce			✓
Jason Kelce			✓
Travis Kelce	✓		✓
Kelis		✓	
Megan Keller			✓
Sally Kellerman	✓		
Bridget Kelly			✓
R. Kelly			✓
Jim Keltner			✓
Ellie Kemper			✓
Anna Kendrick	✓		
Tom Kenny			✓
George Kennedy	✓		
Arthur Kent			✓
Carolyn Kepcher			✓
Nancy Kerrigan	✓		
Keegan-Michael Key	✓		
Alicia Keys		✓	
Chaka Khan		✓	
Khalid		✓	
Kid Creole and The Coconuts		✓	
Kid Rock		✓	✓
Margot Kidder	✓		
Nicole Kidman	✓		
Greg Kihn		✓	
The Killers		✓	
Val Kilmer	✓		✓
Kimbra			✓
Roslyn Kind		✓	
King Princess		✓	
Carole King			✓
Don King			✓
Gayle King			✓
Kip King			✓
Mark King			✓
Regina King	✓		
Kings of Leon		✓	
Sam Kinison	✓		✓
The Kinks		✓	
Melanie Kinnaman			✓
Greg Kinnear	✓		
Robert Klein	✓		
Kevin Kline	✓		
Richard Kneip			✓
Hilary Knight			✓
Ted Knight	✓		
Mark Knopfler		✓	✓
Johnny Knoxville	✓		✓
Takeru Kobayashi			✓
Ed Koch	✓		✓
David Koechner			✓
Frederick Koehler			✓
Kool and The Gang		✓	
Kool Moe Dee		✓	
Bernie Kopell			✓
Korn		✓	
Steve Kornacki			✓
Linda Kozub			✓
Jane Krakowski			✓
Ed Kranepool			✓
John Krasinski	✓		
Lenny Kravitz		✓	✓
Zoë Kravitz	✓		✓
Chantal Kreviazuk			✓
Kris Kristofferson	✓		
Lisa Kudrow	✓		✓
Margaret Kuhn			✓
Pamelia Kurstin			✓
Bill Kurtis			✓
Ashton Kutcher	✓		✓

== L ==
Performer	Host	Musical guest	Cameo
L.V.			✓
Lianne La Havas			✓
Eriq La Salle			✓
Shia LaBeouf	✓		
Steve Lacy		✓	
Nick Lachey	✓		
Lady A		✓	
Lady Gaga	✓	✓	✓
Ladysmith Black Mambazo		✓	✓
Padma Lakshmi			✓
Kendrick Lamar		✓	✓
Ray LaMontagne		✓	
David Lander			✓
Steve Landesberg			✓
Moon Landrieu			✓
Nathan Lane	✓		
Artie Lange			✓
Lewis Lapham			✓
Tommy Larkins			✓
John Larroquette	✓		
Brie Larson	✓		
Louise Lasser	✓		
Latto			✓
Matt Lauer			✓
Hugh Laurie	✓		
Taylor Lautner	✓		
Avril Lavigne		✓	
Jude Law	✓		✓
Jerry Lawler			✓
Lucy Lawless	✓		
Jennifer Lawrence	✓		✓
Martin Lawrence	✓		
Irving Paul Lazar			✓
LCD Soundsystem		✓	
Nicholas Lea			✓
Kate Lear			✓
Norman Lear	✓		
Christopher Lee	✓		
Jason Lee	✓		
Pamela Lee	✓		
Spike Lee			✓
Tommy Lee			✓
Laura Leighton	✓		
Sean Lennon			✓
Annie Lennox		✓	
Jay Leno	✓		✓
Kay Lenz			✓
Rose Leslie			✓
Level 42		✓	
Adam Levine	✓		✓
Dan Levy	✓		
Eugene Levy			✓
Monica Lewinsky			✓
David Lewis			✓
Jerry Lewis	✓		
Ryan Lewis		✓	
Liberace			✓
Gordon Lightfoot		✓	
Lil Baby		✓	✓
Lil Nas X		✓	
Lil Pump			✓
Lil Wayne		✓	✓
Lil Yachty		✓	
Hal Linden			✓
David Lindley			✓
Linkin Park		✓	
Ray Liotta	✓		
Dua Lipa	✓	✓	
James Lipton			✓
Peyton List			✓
John Lithgow	✓		
Little Feat		✓	
Lucy Liu	✓		
Simu Liu	✓		
Blake Lively	✓		✓
Living Colour		✓	
Lizzo	✓	✓	
LL Cool J		✓	
Christopher Lloyd			✓
Graeme Lloyd			✓
Tove Lo			✓
The Lockers			✓
Heather Locklear	✓		
Kurt Loder			✓
Lisa Loeb		✓	
Kenny Loggins		✓	
Lindsay Lohan	✓		✓
Michael Lohan			✓
Lone Justice		✓	
Justin Long			✓
Eva Longoria	✓		
Jennifer Lopez	✓	✓	✓
Lorde		✓	✓
Los Lobos		✓	
Taylor Louderman			✓
Julia Louis-Dreyfus	✓		✓
Demi Lovato		✓	✓
Darlene Love			✓
Loverboy		✓	
Jon Lovitz	✓		✓
Charlie Lowe			✓
Rob Lowe	✓		
Susan Lucci	✓		✓
Ron Luciano			✓
Lucius			✓
Ludacris	✓	✓	✓
Rick Ludwin			✓
The Lumineers		✓	
Patti LuPone			✓
Luscious Jackson		✓	
Jane Lynch	✓		
Natasha Lyonne	✓		✓

== See also ==
- List of Saturday Night Live guests (A–D)
- List of Saturday Night Live guests (E–H)
- List of Saturday Night Live guests (M–P)
- List of Saturday Night Live guests (Q–T)
- List of Saturday Night Live guests (U–Z)
