= Drunken Sailor =

Sea shanty from 1830s or earlier

Song
- Written: 1830s or earlier
- Genre: Sea shanty

"Drunken Sailor", also known as "What Will/Shall We Do with a/the Drunken Sailor?" or "Up She Rises", is a traditional sea shanty, listed as No. 322 in the Roud Folk Song Index. It was sung aboard sailing ships at least as early as the 1830s. The first published description of the shanty is found in an account of an 1839 whaling voyage out of New London, Connecticut, to the Pacific Ocean.

The song's lyrics vary, but usually contain some variant of the question, "What shall we do with a drunken sailor, early in the morning?" In some styles of performance, each successive verse suggests a method of sobering or punishing the drunken sailor. In other styles, further questions are asked and answered about different people.

"Drunken Sailor" was revived as a popular song among non-sailors in the 20th century and grew to become one of the best-known songs of the shanty repertoire among mainstream audiences. It has been performed and recorded by many musicians and appeared regularly in popular culture.

The word "early" in the song is pronounced /ˈɜːrlaɪ/.

== History ==
=== Origin and melody ===
The authorship and origin of the song are unknown, but it bears a resemblance with the traditional Irish folk song Óró sé do bheatha abhaile due to its shared chord progression and use of repeated lyrics over melodic sequences.

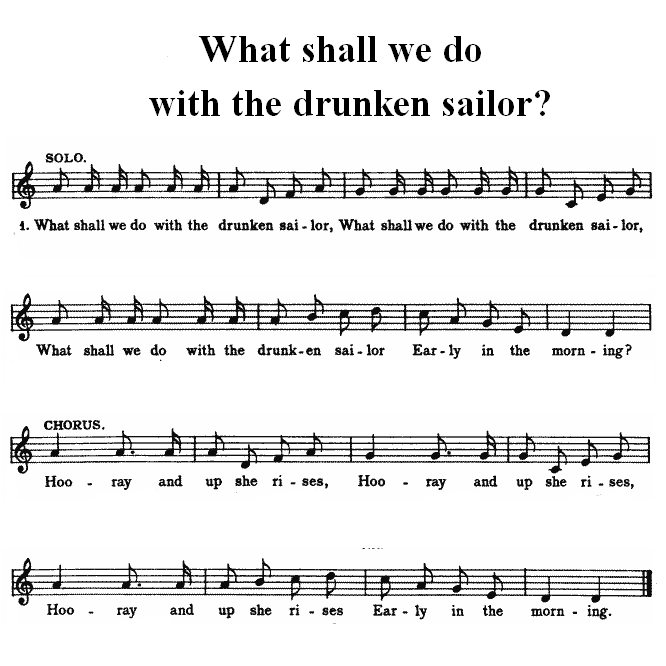
Melody and first verse of "Drunken Sailor", culled from R. R. Terry's The Shanty Book, Part One (1921).

It is in the Dorian mode.

=== As a sea shanty ===
The song was sung to accompany certain work tasks aboard sailing ships, especially those that required a brisk walking pace. It is believed to originate in the early 19th century or earlier, during a period when ships' crews, especially those of military vessels, were large enough to permit hauling a rope whilst simply marching along the deck. With the advent of merchant packet and clipper ships and their smaller crews, which required different working methods, use of the shanty appears to have declined or shifted to other, minor tasks.

The first published description of the shanty is found in an account of an 1839 whaling voyage out of New London, Connecticut, to the Pacific Ocean. It was used as an example of a song that was "performed with very good effect when there is a long line of men hauling together". The tune was noted, along with these lyrics:

Ho! Ho! and up she rises.
Ho! Ho! and up she rises.
Ho! Ho! and up she rises,
Early in the morning.

Although this is the earliest discovered published mention, there is some indication that the shanty is at least as old as the 1820s. In Eckstorm and Smyth's collection Minstrelsy of Maine (published 1927), the editors note that one of their grandmothers, who sang the song, claimed to have heard it used during the task of tacking on the Penobscot River "probably [by the time of the editor's reportage] considerably over a hundred years ago".

Despite these indications of the song's existence in the first half of the 19th century, references to it are rare. They include a reference in a work of fiction from 1855 in which a drunken female cook is portrayed singing,

Hee roar, up she rouses,
What shall we do with the drunken sailor?

A five-verse set of lyrics and tune were published in the third edition of Davis and Tozer's shanty collection, Sailor Songs or 'Chanties'. However, the title did not appear in any of the other major shanty collections or articles of the 19th century.

When John Masefield next published the lyrics in 1906, he called it a "bastard variety" of shanty which was "seldom used"—an assertion supported by the lack of many earlier references. This style of shanty, called a "runaway chorus" by Masefield, and as a "stamp and go" or "walk away" shanty by others, was said to be used for tacking and which was sung in "quick time". The verses in Masefield's version asked what to do with a "drunken sailor", followed by a response, then followed by a question about a "drunken soldier", with an appropriate response.

Capt. W. B. Whall, a veteran English sailor of the 1860s–70s, was the next author to publish on "Drunken Sailor". He claimed that this was one of only two shanties that was sung in the British Royal Navy (where singing at work was generally frowned upon). Moreover, the song had largely gone out of use as a "walk away" shanty when the size of ships' crews was reduced and it was no longer possible to use that working method. The lyrics given by Whall are essentially the same as those from Masefield: about a "drunken sailor", then a "drunken soldier". Significantly, he stated that these were the only lyrics, as evidently the task did not take long to complete.

Chorus: Hoorah! And up she rises [three times, appears before each verse]
Early in the morning.

What shall we do with a drunken sailor? [3x]
Early in the morning.

Put him in the longboat and make him bail her.
Early in the morning.

What shall we do with a drunken soldier?
Early in the morning.

Put him in the guardroom till he gets sober.
Early in the morning.

The above-mentioned and other veteran sailors characterized "Drunken Sailor" as a "walk away" shanty, thus providing a possible explanation for why it was not noted more often in the second half of the 19th century. Later sailors' recollections, however, attested that the song continued to be used as a shanty, but for other purposes. Richard Maitland, an American sailor of the 1870s, sang it for song collector Alan Lomax in 1939, when he explained,

Now this is a song that's usually sang when men are walking away with the slack of a rope, generally when the iron ships are scrubbing their bottom. After an iron ship has been twelve months at sea, there's a quite a lot of barnacles and grass grows onto her bottom. And generally, in the calm latitudes, up in the horse latitudes in the North Atlantic Ocean, usually they rig up a purchase for to scrub the bottom.

Another American sailor of the 1870s, Frederick Pease Harlow, wrote in his shanty collection that "Drunken Sailor" could be used when hauling a halyard in "hand over hand" fashion to hoist the lighter sails. This would be in contradistinction to the much more typical "halyards shanties", which were for heavier work with an entirely different sort of pacing and formal structure. Another author to ascribe a function, Richard Runciman Terry, also said it could be used for "hand over hand" hauling. Terry was one of few writers, however, to also state the shanty was used for heaving the windlass or capstan.

In 1906, Percy Grainger recorded Charles Rosher of London, England, singing "What shall we do with a drunken sailor", and the recording is available online via the British Library Sound Archive. The folklorist James Madison Carpenter recorded several veteran sailors singing the song in the 1920s and 30s, which can be heard online courtesy of the Vaughan Williams Memorial Library.

=== As a popular song ===
"Drunken Sailor" began its life as a popular song on land at least as early as the 1900s, by which time it had been adopted as repertoire for glee singing at Eton College. Elsewhere in England, by the 1910s, men had begun to sing it regularly at gatherings of the Savage Club of London.

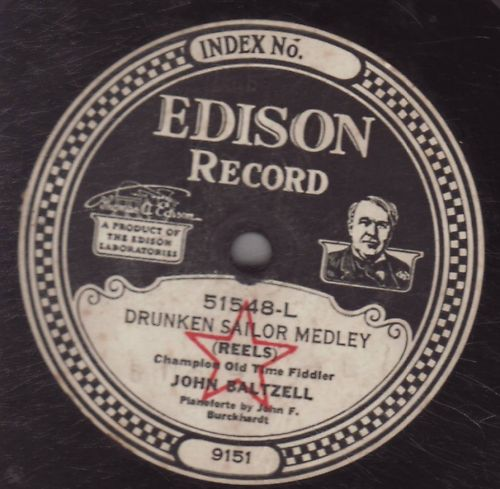
"Drunken Sailor Medley" by John Baltzell (1923)

The song became popular on land in America as well. A catalogue of "folk-songs" from the Midwest included it in 1915, where it was said to be sung while dancing "a sort of reel". More evidence of lands-folk's increasing familiarity with "Drunken Sailor" comes in the recording of a "Drunken Sailor Medley" (c. 1923) by U.S. old-time fiddler John Baltzell. Evidently, the tune's shared affinities with Anglo-Irish-American dance tunes helped it to become readapted as such as Baltzell included it among a set of reels.

Classical composers utilized the song in compositions. Australian composer Percy Grainger incorporated the song into his piece "Scotch Strathspey And Reel" (1924). Malcolm Arnold used its melody in his Three Shanties for Woodwind Quintet, Op. 4 (1943).

The glut of writings on sailors' songs and published collections that came starting in the 1920s supported a revival of interest in shanty-singing for entertainment purposes on land. As such, R. R. Terry's very popular shanty collection, which had begun to serve as a resource for renditions of shanties on commercial recordings in the 1920s, was evidently used by the Robert Shaw Chorale for their 1961 rendition. The Norman Luboff Choir recorded the song in 1959 with the uncharacteristic phrasing "What'll we do...?".

The song shares the same tune with a Lent and Easter hymn, We Have A King Who Rides A Donkey which was written by Fred Kaan.

The song is also heard numerous times in episodes of the Nickelodeon animated TV Series SpongeBob SquarePants. The shanty was performed by Okko Bekker in 1989.

== Notable recordings and performances ==
The song has been widely recorded under a number of titles by a range of performers including Black Lagoon, The King's Singers, Pete Seeger, The Blaggards, U.K. Subs, The Bolokos, Malinda Kathleen Reese, Nathan Evans, Authority Zero and The Irish Rovers.

For over 50 years, the Irish Rovers have played the song as their usual show closer. Several of their recordings of the song, sometimes under the name "Weigh, Hey and up She Rises", have gone viral on YouTube. As a response, the band released the 2012 album Drunken Sailor, which includes the title track and a prequel that tells the earlier life of the drunken sailor called "Whores and Hounds".

Don Janse produced an arrangement in the early 1960s which has been included in several choral music anthologies. The arrangement was first recorded by The Idlers, and has been performed by several collegiate groups over the years, including the Yale Alley Cats.

Pere Ubu's 1978 song "Caligari's Mirror" is a post-punk reworking of "Drunken Sailor".

Irish pop group Gina, Dale Haze and the Champions released a disco version of the song in 1981, which became a top 20 hit in the Irish charts.

The melody was also utilized by NFL Films composer Sam Spence for his track "Up as She Rises".

In Ringo Starr's rendition of "You're Sixteen", Starr is heard singing the chorus of the song in the fade at the end.

The 2019 film Fisherman's Friends, based on a true story, features a Cornish group of fishermen who sing the song en route to hitting the pop charts and touring. The song also features in the end credits.

In the 1998 film The Truman Show, Jim Carrey's eponymous character sings the song as he makes his attempt to sail away from the confines of his island-home.

The song was used at the end of Episode 5 in Season 2 of the television series Landman (titled "The Pirate Dinner").

In 2026, during the 2026 Iran war, a modified version of the song titled "What shall we do with the drunken Hegseth" was featured in an Iranian Lego-themed propaganda video.

== Song text ==
Chorus:

Weigh heigh and up she rises / [alt] Hoo-ray and up she rises / [alt] Yea-hey, up she rises
Weigh heigh and up she rises / [alt] Patent blocks of different sizes
Weigh heigh and up she rises
Early in the morning

Traditional verses:

What shall we do with a drunken sailor,
What shall we do with a drunken sailor,
What shall we do with a drunken sailor,
Early in the morning?

Put / chuck him in / the longboat 'til he's sober.
Put him in the longboat and make him bail her.
What shall we do with a drunken soldier?
Put/lock him in the guard room 'til he gets sober.
Put him in the scuppers with a hosepipe on him.
Put him in bed with the captain's daughter
Pull out the plug and wet him all over.
Tie him to the taffrail when she's yardarm under
Heave him by the leg in a runnin' bowline.
Scrape the hair off his chest with a hoop-iron razor.
Give 'im a dose of salt and water.
Stick on his back a mustard plaster.
Keep him there and make 'im bail 'er.
Give 'im a taste of the bosun's rope-end.
What'll we do with a Limejuice skipper?
Soak him in oil till he sprouts a flipper.
What shall we do with the Queen o' Sheba?
What shall we do with the Virgin Mary?

Additional verses:

Tie him to the mast and then you flog him.
Keel haul him till he's sober.
Shave his chin with a rusty razor.
Beat 'im o'r wi' a cat-o-nine-tails.
Shave his belly with a rusty razor.
Give 'im a hair of the dog that bit him.
Put him in the bilge and make him drink it.

Parody verses:

Put him at the wheel of an Exxon tanker / [alt] make him captain of an Exxon tanker
* A common parody reference to the 1989 Exxon Valdez oil spill.
Book him a room at the Tailhook Convention.
* Refers to the 1991 Tailhook scandal.
Make him sing in an Irish Rock band
Lock him in a room with disco music
Don't let him drive / steer / near that cargo freighter.
* Refers to the 2021 Suez Canal obstruction.

Only do things he'd consent to sober.
* Refers to sexual consent.
Send him home in the back of an Uber.
Put him in touch with relevant support groups.

Final verse:

That's what we do with the drunken sailor.
