= Big Boys (song) =

2022 song and Saturday Night Live sketch

- Saturday Night Live segment
- Musical guest SZA, surrounded by stout male backup dancers
- Episode no.: Season 48; Episode 7 (segment)
- Written by: Punkie Johnson, Vannessa Jackson, and Streeter Seidell
- Original air date: December 3, 2022

Guest appearances
- Keke Palmer as herself; SZA as herself

"Big Boys" is a novelty song written for a pretaped comedy sketch on the television show Saturday Night Live (SNL). It was performed during the forty-eighth season's seventh episode, which featured Keke Palmer as the host and SZA as the musical guest. The song is about celebrating stout men, praising their ability to keep people warm in winter. Its lyrics frequently reference the cuffing season, a time of year coinciding with winter when people look for a romantic partner to keep them company while indoors. Punkie Johnson, Vannessa Jackson, and Streeter Seidell wrote the song.

The song aired on December 3, 2022, and was performed by Palmer and SZA, alongside three cast members from the show. It went viral on social media platforms shortly afterwards, starting video trends and a dance challenge on TikTok. A snippet of the chorus was used in over two million videos, many of which involved users embracing their overweight or tall boyfriends. The song appeared on another SNL episode from the same season, during a sketch parodying fanvids (fan edits) on TikTok. "Big Boys" was one of the five most-watched pretaped sketches of season 48. The song was never released as a single.

== Background ==
On December 3, 2022, singer-songwriter SZA appeared on the television show Saturday Night Live (SNL). She was the musical guest for that night's episode, the seventh of SNL's forty-eighth season. Before this, she had been teasing the release of her second studio album, SOS (2022). For her set, she performed two songs from the album.

SZA also contributed to a rap track from one of the episode's comedy sketches. Accompanying her for the song – titled "Big Boys" – was guest host and actress Keke Palmer. Three SNL cast members for the season co-performed with them: Cecily Strong, Ego Nwodim, and Punkie Johnson.

== Music and lyrics ==
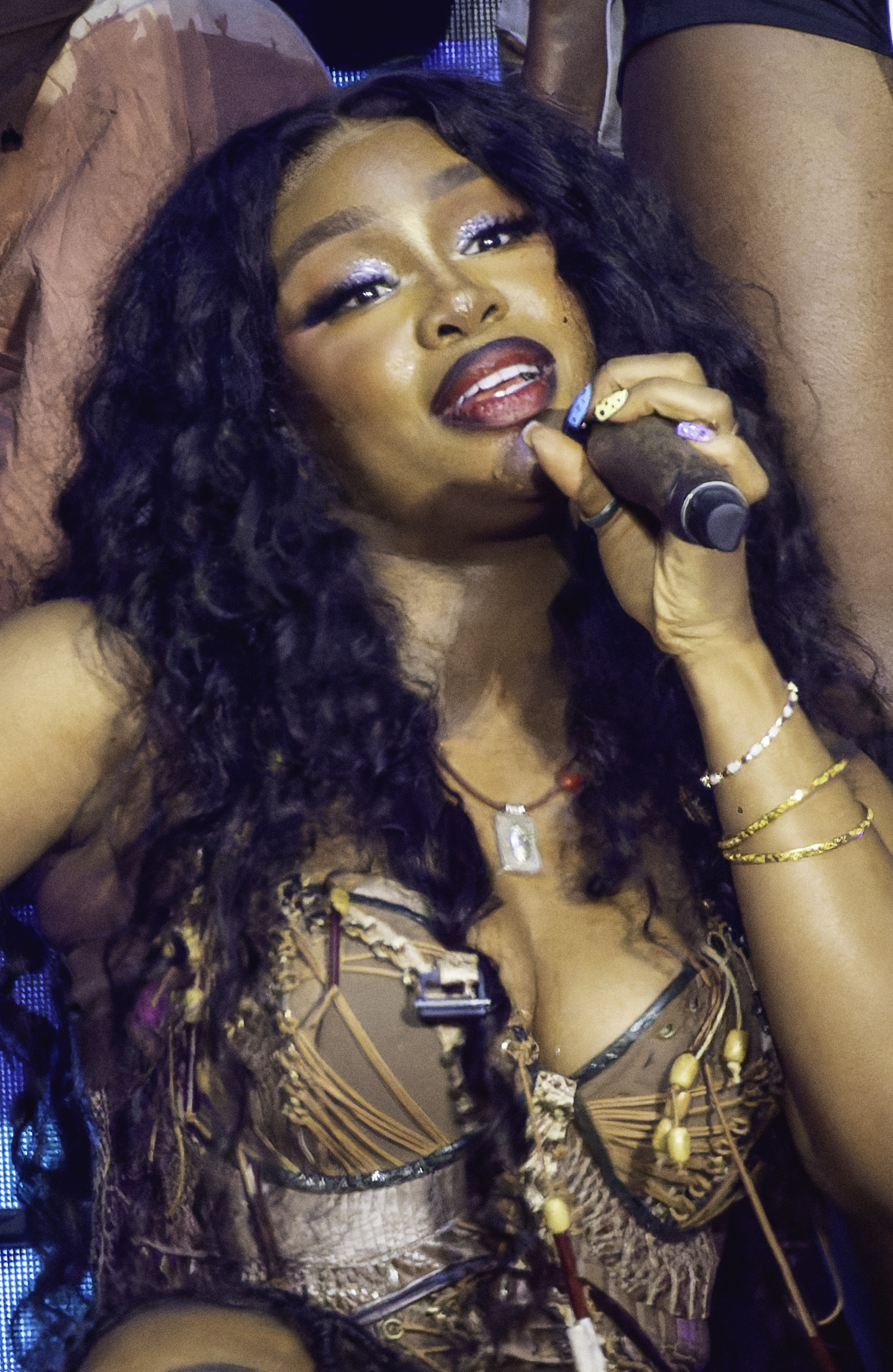
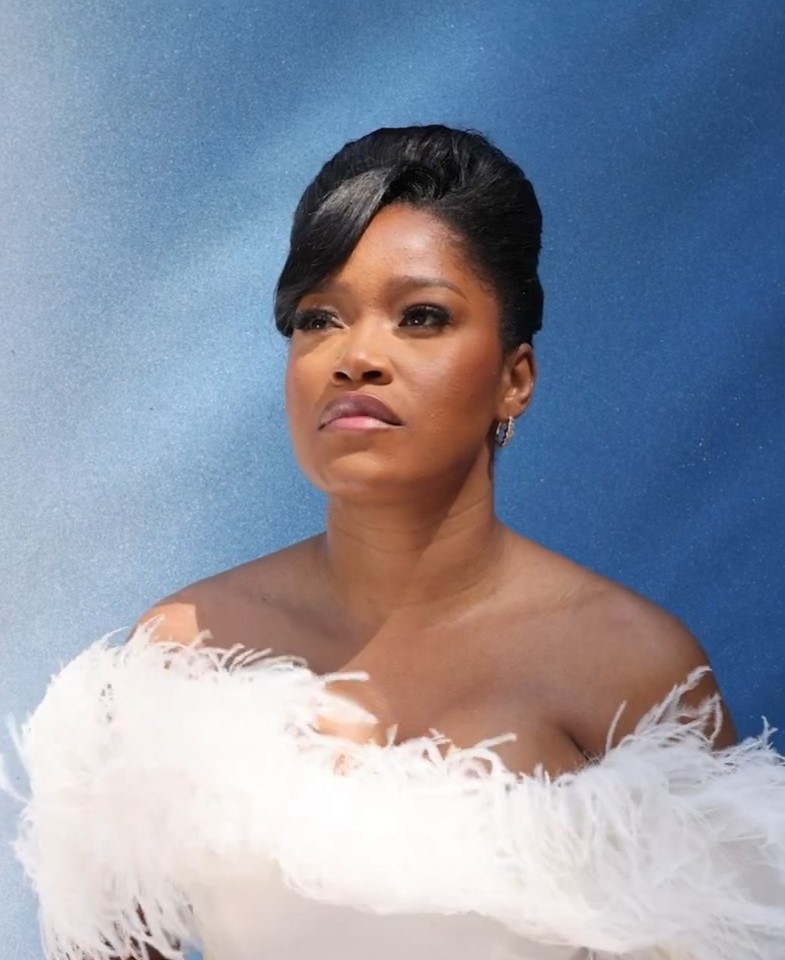
Musical guest SZA (left) and guest host Keke Palmer (right) were co-performers for the "Big Boys" sketch.

The making of "Big Boys" took around 15 minutes. According to SZA, the song was being created during a rehearsal, during which she was asked if she could sing the hook. Agreeing to the request, she enlisted the help of one of her music engineers to record her part. The verses are performed by Palmer and the SNL cast using a rap delivery. Ana Diaz wrote in a Polygon article that SZA's vocals were "notably emotional and sincere for a comedy song performance".

"Big Boys" was written by Punkie Johnson, Vannessa Jackson, and Streeter Seidell. It is a novelty song, with the premise of finding a boyfriend who specifically is overweight. The performers express their preference for stout men, celebrating their physique for providing warmth in the cold weather.

In the hook, SZA declares that it is time to find a "big boy" because cuffing season has begun. The cuffing season is frequently referenced in the song; it is a time of the year that coincides with winter, when people look for a romantic partner to keep them company indoors during the winter. Meanwhile, SZA's fellow performers list their criteria for a potential "big boy" partner, including a stocked fridge, a California King bed, and "legs like a monster". Palmer raps about her desire for a man with "polar bear arms", who can carry their groceries in "just one trip". Using her lover's body heat to roast marshmallows, Nwodim adds: "'Til the sun comes back I need a big boy hottie / Makes his own heat with his big boy body."

== Video ==
The "Big Boys" music video was directed by Mike Diva. Several overweight men appear throughout its runtime. Stout men in Santa hats and pajamas act as backup dancers in some scenes; others are shoveling snow in their shorts during the song's conclusion. For the latter scene, SNL cast member Kenan Thompson enters to say that those "bears", including him, do not hibernate in the winter and are easy to find.

Smaller and more muscular men are the video's subject of ridicule. In one scene, SZA scoffs at a poster of a shirtless Chris Pratt as Star-Lord from the Guardians of the Galaxy franchise. Disappointed, she replaces it with one of Pratt as Andy Dwyer from the sitcom show Parks and Recreation.

== Reception and virality ==
"Big Boys" (2022)
Various critics attributed the popularity and Internet virality of "Big Boys" to its perceived catchiness. In particular, the chorus went viral on the social media platform TikTok.

"Big Boys" went viral across social media. It became so popular online that many people thought that the song was not from SNL, but actually from SZA's discography. One of the social media platforms where "Big Boys" went viral was TikTok, where an unofficial audio snippet was used in over two million videos. Several accounts started dance challenges and other trends using the sound; one trend involved users embracing their stout or tall boyfriends as the chorus played. The trend led to some controversy because several men in the videos were tall and skinny, not overweight. After it went viral on TikTok, SNL reused the song for another season 48 sketch parodying fan culture. In the sketch, the "Big Boys" chorus plays when students' fanvids (Note: Fanvids (sometimes called "fan edits" or "fancams") are fan-edited videos praising an idolized person.) of a teacher (played by Pedro Pascal) are played.

Critics wrote positively about "Big Boys" lightheartedness. In a listicle for Vulture, Joe Berkowitz picked "Big Boys" as one of his 17 favorite sketches from the season. The song's catchy nature, and the video's "teddy-bear men", were his points of praise. Charu Sinha, for the same publication, found SZA fun to watch during the episode and wrote that her sketch was the season's most viral "without a doubt". In 2025, Bryanna Cappadona of Today ranked "Big Boys" as one of the 50 best SNL sketches of all time, calling it an earworm.

"Big Boys" was one of the five most-watched pretaped sketches of season 48. According to several journalists, the music's catchiness made it one of the biggest sketches from the season, or of all time. These include Berkowitz, who believed that the song could easily pass for a single that was successful on contemporary hit radio. Cappadona said their decision to include "Big Boys" on the Today ranking was because "the internet just can't shake [off]" the tune, even years after the sketch aired. Writing a 2023 retrospective of SNL sketches for Collider, Usama Masood commented that "Big Boys" became popular way beyond the context of SNL and turned into a "cultural touchstone" in its own right. The song was never released as a single.
