= List of Saturday Night Live guests (E–H) =

The following is a list of people who have been guests on Saturday Night Live. This section consists of people who fall between the letter E through H.

The list below shows the people who have appeared on the show. It is split into three sections: Host, if the person hosted the show at any given time; Musical guest, if a person was the musical guest on the show at any given time; and Cameo, which is for a person who has appeared on the show but did not act as host or musical guest at any given time.

== E ==
Performer	Host	Musical guest	Cameo
Sheila E.		✓	
Craig Eastman			✓
Elliot Easton			✓
Dick Ebersol			✓
Roger Ebert			✓
Ayo Edebiri	✓		
Anthony Edwards	✓		
Marshall Efron			✓
Zac Efron	✓		
Billy Eichner			✓
Billie Eilish	✓	✓	
Hannah Einbinder			✓
Jesse Eisenberg	✓		
Ejae			✓
Idris Elba	✓		
Missy Elliott		✓	
Jacob Elordi	✓		
Eminem		✓	✓
En Vogue		✓	
Emilio Estevez	✓		
Amber Lee Ettinger			✓
Eurythmics		✓	
Eve		✓	✓
Everclear		✓	
Angie Everhart			✓
Everlast		✓	
Joyce Everson		✓	
Chris Evert	✓		
George Ezra		✓	

== F ==
Performer	Host	Musical guest	Cameo
Fabolous			✓
Morgan Fairchild			✓
Faith No More		✓	
Marianne Faithfull		✓	✓
Brent Faiyaz			✓
Jimmy Fallon	✓		✓
Fall Out Boy		✓	
Anna Faris	✓		✓
Chris Farley	✓		✓
Colin Farrell	✓		✓
Dionne Farris		✓	
Ramona Farrow			✓
Jeff Fassero			✓
Fat Joe			✓
Fear		✓	
Feist		✓	
Will Ferrell	✓		✓
Bryan Ferry		✓	
Tina Fey	✓		✓
Sally Field	✓		
Harvey Fierstein			✓
Nathan Fillion			✓
Fine Young Cannibals		✓	
Doctor Fink			✓
Hugh Fink			✓
Finneas			✓
Colin Firth	✓		
Fishbone		✓	
Jenna Fischer			✓
Carrie Fisher	✓		✓
The Fixx		✓	
The Flaming Lips			✓
Harley Flanagan			✓
Bela Fleck			✓
Fleet Foxes		✓	
Mick Fleetwood			✓
Calista Flockhart	✓		
Florence and the Machine		✓	
Chloe Flower			✓
Cliff Floyd			✓
Jared Fogle			✓
Mick Foley			✓
Flo Rida		✓	
Jane Fonda			✓
Foo Fighters		✓	✓
Steve Forbes	✓		
Gerald Ford			✓
George Foreman	✓		
Will Forte	✓		✓
Foster the People		✓	
Jodie Foster	✓		
Dexter Fowler			✓
Jim Fowler			✓
Julia Fox			✓
Matthew Fox	✓		✓
Megan Fox	✓		✓
Michael J. Fox	✓		
Jamie Foxx	✓		
Claire Foy	✓		
Tan France			✓
Dave Franco			✓
James Franco	✓		✓
Al Franken			✓
Joe Franken			✓
Phoebe Franken			✓
Frankie Goes To Hollywood		✓	
Aretha Franklin		✓	
Kirk Franklin			✓
Franz Ferdinand		✓	
Nikolai Fraiture			✓
Brendan Fraser	✓		✓
Martin Freeman	✓		
Morgan Freeman			✓
Fridayy			✓
Kinky Friedman		✓	
Robert Fripp			✓
fun.		✓	
Funky Four Plus One		✓	
Edward Furlong			✓
Nelly Furtado		✓	
Future			✓

== G ==
Performer	Host	Musical guest	Cameo
Karol G		✓	
Kenny G			✓
G-Eazy			✓
G-Unit		✓	
Josh Gad			✓
Gal Gadot	✓		
Peter Gabriel		✓	
Jim Gaffigan			✓
Chris Gaines		✓	
Zach Galifianakis	✓		
James Gandolfini			✓
Garbage		✓	
Nomar Garciaparra			✓
Andrew Garfield	✓		✓
Art Garfunkel	✓		✓
Jack Garner			✓
Jennifer Garner	✓		✓
Teri Garr	✓		✓
Siedah Garrett		✓	
Kyle Gass			✓
Ana Gasteyer			✓
Geese		✓	
Sarah Michelle Gellar	✓		✓
George Thorogood and The Destroyers		✓	
Georgia Mass Choir			✓
Kaia Gerber			✓
Gina Gershon			✓
Ricky Gervais			✓
Greta Gerwig			✓
Paul Giamatti	✓		
Barry Gibb			✓
Freddie Gibbs			✓
Mel Gibson	✓		
Sara Gilbert	✓		
Shane Gillis	✓		✓
David Gilmour		✓	
Gin Blossoms		✓	
The Gipsy Kings		✓	
Rudy Giuliani	✓		✓
Adele Givens			✓
Nikki Glaser	✓		
Philip Glass		✓	
Tom Glavine			✓
Brendan Gleeson	✓		
Danny Glover			✓
Donald Glover	✓	✓	✓
Savion Glover			✓
Gnarls Barkley		✓	
The Go-Go's		✓	
Dave Goelz			✓
Walton Goggins	✓		✓
Andrew Gold		✓	✓
Whoopi Goldberg			✓
Jeff Goldblum	✓		
Marvin Goldhar			✓
Selena Gomez	✓	✓	✓
Good Charlotte		✓	
Cuba Gooding Jr.	✓		✓
John Goodman	✓		✓
Jeff Gordon	✓		
Diana Gordon			✓
Kim Gordon			✓
Ruth Gordon	✓		
Joseph Gordon-Levitt	✓		
Al Gore	✓		✓
Tipper Gore			✓
Gorillaz		✓	
Ryan Gosling	✓		✓
Louis Gossett Jr.	✓		
Gilbert Gottfried			✓
Gotye		✓	
Elliott Gould	✓		✓
Ellie Goulding		✓	
Topher Grace	✓		
Heather Graham	✓		
Kelsey Grammer	✓		✓
Ariana Grande	✓	✓	
Joan Grande			✓
Eddy Grant		✓	
The Grateful Dead		✓	
Gravity		✓	
David Gray		✓	
Macy Gray		✓	
Spalding Gray			✓
Al Green		✓	
Brian Austin Green			✓
Cee Lo Green			✓
Mary Jane Green			✓
Richard Green			✓
Seth Green			✓
Tom Green	✓		✓
Green Day		✓	
Dabbs Greer			✓
Jane Greer			✓
Greta Van Fleet		✓	
Wayne Gretzky	✓		
Skyler Grey			✓
David Alan Grier	✓		✓
Jon Gries			✓
Blake Griffin			✓
Merv Griffin			✓
Andy Griffith			✓
Melanie Griffith	✓		✓
Grimes			✓
Charles Grodin	✓		
Dave Grohl			✓
Don Grolnick			✓
Lawrence K. Grossman			✓
Mark Grudzielanek			✓
Christopher Guest			✓
Robert Guillaume	✓		
Bryant Gumbel			✓
Gunna		✓	✓
Savannah Guthrie			✓
Steve Guttenberg	✓		
Buddy Guy			✓
Jake Gyllenhaal	✓		✓

== H ==
Performer	Host	Musical guest	Cameo
H.E.R.		✓	✓
Brittany Haas			✓
Joan Hackett			✓
Bill Hader	✓		✓
Tiffany Haddish	✓		
Julie Hagerty			✓
Marvelous Marvin Hagler			✓
HAIM		✓	✓
Tony Hale			✓
Nikki Haley			✓
Halsey	✓	✓	✓
Daryl Hall		✓	
Jerry Hall	✓		✓
Larry Hama			✓
Mark Hamill			✓
Ashley Hamilton			✓
Linda Hamilton	✓		
Jon Hamm	✓		✓
MC Hammer	✓	✓	
Darrell Hammond			✓
Mark Hampton			✓
Herbie Hancock		✓	
Tom Hanks	✓		✓
Hanson		✓	
Harajuku Girls			✓
David Harbour	✓		
Mariska Hargitay			✓
Kit Harington	✓		
Jack Harlow	✓	✓	
Mark Harmon	✓		
Ben Harper			✓
Donny Harper		✓	
Woody Harrelson	✓		✓
Kamala Harris			✓
Neil Patrick Harris	✓		
George Harrison		✓	
Olivia Harrison			✓
Deborah Harry	✓	✓	
Josh Hart			✓
Kevin Hart	✓		
Phil Hartman	✓		
Josh Hartnett	✓		
David Hasselhoff			✓
Teri Hatcher	✓		
Anne Hathaway	✓		✓
Tony Hawk			✓
Connie Hawkins			✓
Lili Haydn			✓
Salma Hayek	✓		
Sean Hayes	✓		
Robert Hays	✓		
Dennis Haysbert			✓
Jon Heder	✓		
Hugh Hefner	✓		
Robert Hegyes			✓
Levon Helm		✓	
Ed Helms	✓		✓
Sherman Hemsley			✓
Mariel Hemingway	✓		✓
Chris Hemsworth	✓		
Liam Hemsworth			✓
Luke Hemsworth			✓
Florence Henderson			✓
Steve Henderson			✓
Don Henley		✓	
Marilu Henner			✓
Erika Henningsen			✓
Buck Henry	✓		✓
Grey Henson			✓
Jim Henson			✓
Taraji P. Henson	✓		
Natasha Henstridge			✓
Felix Heredia			✓
Ed Herlihy			✓
Pee-wee Herman	✓		✓
Howard Hesseman	✓		✓
Charlton Heston	✓		✓
Jennifer Love Hewitt	✓		
John Hiatt		✓	
Giovanni Hidalgo			✓
Steve Higgins			✓
Faith Hill		✓	
Jonah Hill	✓		✓
Lauryn Hill		✓	
Paris Hilton	✓		✓
Gregory Hines		✓	
Judd Hirsch			✓
Joel Hodgson			✓
Abbie Hoffman			✓
Hal Holbrook			✓
Hole		✓	
Jennifer Holliday		✓	
Buster Holmes			✓
Katie Holmes	✓		
Larry Holmes			✓
Evander Holyfield			✓
The Honeydrippers		✓	
Jan Hooks			✓
Dennis Hopper	✓		
Niall Horan		✓	
Bruce Hornsby		✓	✓
Bob Hoskins			✓
Hothouse Flowers		✓	
Whitney Houston		✓	
Brittany Howard			✓
David Howard			✓
Ron Howard	✓		✓
Hozier		✓	
Mike Huckabee			✓
Kate Hudson	✓		
Yvonne Hudson			✓
Huey Lewis and the News		✓	
Jack Hughes			✓
Quinn Hughes			✓
Hulk Hogan	✓		
Brett Hull			✓
Creed Humphrey			✓
Barry Humphries			✓
Glenn Humplik			✓
Todd Hundley			✓
Helen Hunt	✓		
Jon Huntsman			✓
Robert Hurst			✓
John Hurt			✓
Mary Beth Hurt			✓
William Hurt			✓
Anjelica Huston	✓		
Josh Hutcherson	✓		✓
Warren Hutcherson			✓
Lauren Hutton	✓		
Timothy Hutton			✓
Chrissie Hynde		✓	✓
Dev Hynes			✓

== See also ==
- List of Saturday Night Live guests (A–D)
- List of Saturday Night Live guests (I–L)
- List of Saturday Night Live guests (M–P)
- List of Saturday Night Live guests (Q–T)
- List of Saturday Night Live guests (U–Z)
