= List of Saturday Night Live guests (U–Z) =

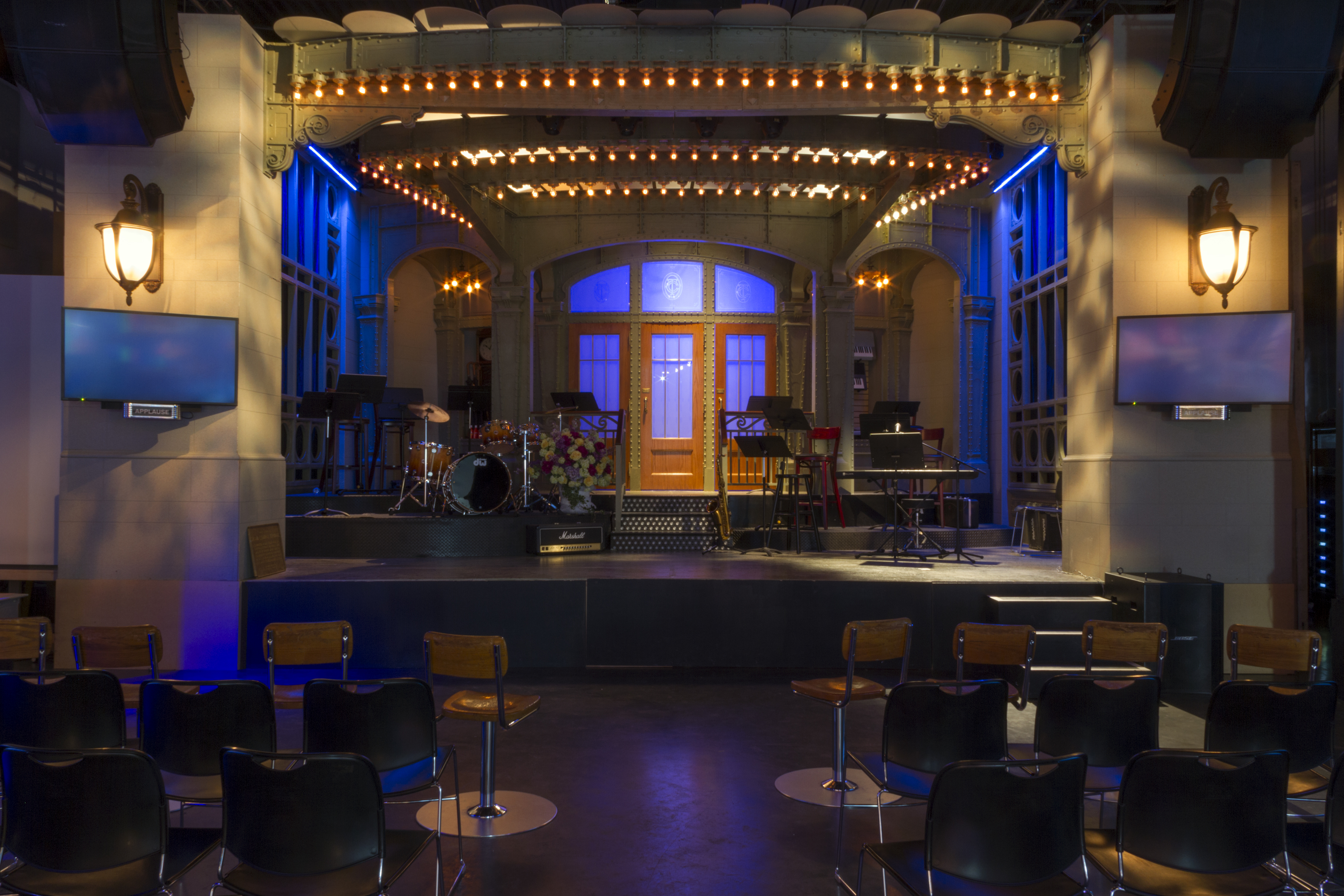
The main stage of Saturday Night Live where an episode host will perform the opening monologue

Saturday Night Live (SNL) is an American late-night sketch comedy and variety show created by Lorne Michaels. It premiered on NBC on October 11, 1975, under the title NBC's Saturday Night. The show usually satirizes contemporary American popular culture and politics. SNL features a two-tiered cast: the repertory cast members, and newer cast members known as "Featured Players." A typical episode of SNL features a single host, who delivers the opening monologue and performs in sketches with the cast. The format also features a musical guest, and a number of episodes have featured celebrity cameos.

George Carlin was the first to host the show. Candice Bergen was both the first female host in November 8, 1975, and the first to host a second time in December of the same year. On occasion, the episode's host also serves as the musical guest; the first was Paul Simon on October 18, 1975. The most recent to pull double duty was Timothée Chalamet on January 25, 2025. The Rolling Stones are the only band to ever serve as both host and musical guest during the same episode, which aired October 7, 1978. Guests who host five times become members of the Five-Timers Club, introduced on the December 8, 1990, episode, when Tom Hanks became the seventh person to host their fifth episode.

The list below shows the people who have appeared on the show. It is split into three sections: "Host", if the person hosted the show at any given time; "Musical guest", if a person was the musical guest on the show at any given time; and "Cameo", which is for a person who has appeared on the show but did not act as host or musical guest.

== U ==
U
Performer	Host	Musical guest	Cameo	First appearance	Ref(s).
U2		✓		December 9, 2000	
UB40		✓		February 12, 1994	
Bob Uecker	✓			October 13, 1984	
Ukrainian Chorus Dumka of New York			✓	February 26, 2022	
Carrie Underwood		✓		February 23, 2008	
Kate Upton			✓	February 18, 2012	
Keith Urban		✓		February 10, 2007	
Robert Urich	✓			March 20, 1982	
Usher		✓		May 17, 2008	

== V ==
V
Performer	Host	Musical guest	Cameo	First appearance	Ref(s).
Vampire Weekend		✓		May 11, 2024	
James Van Der Beek	✓			January 16, 1999	
Eddie Van Halen		✓		February 28, 1987	
Kenny Vance		✓		May 21, 1977	
Luther Vandross		✓	✓	February 20, 1982	
Nia Vardalos	✓			November 9, 2002	
Jimmie Vaughan			✓	February 15, 1986	
Stevie Ray Vaughan		✓		February 15, 1986	
Vince Vaughn	✓			December 5, 1998	
Tesco Vee			✓	October 31, 1981	
Suzanne Vega		✓		May 9, 1987	
Sofia Vergara	✓			April 7, 2012	
Veruca Salt		✓		March 15, 1997	
Matt Vogel			✓	December 18, 2004	

== W ==
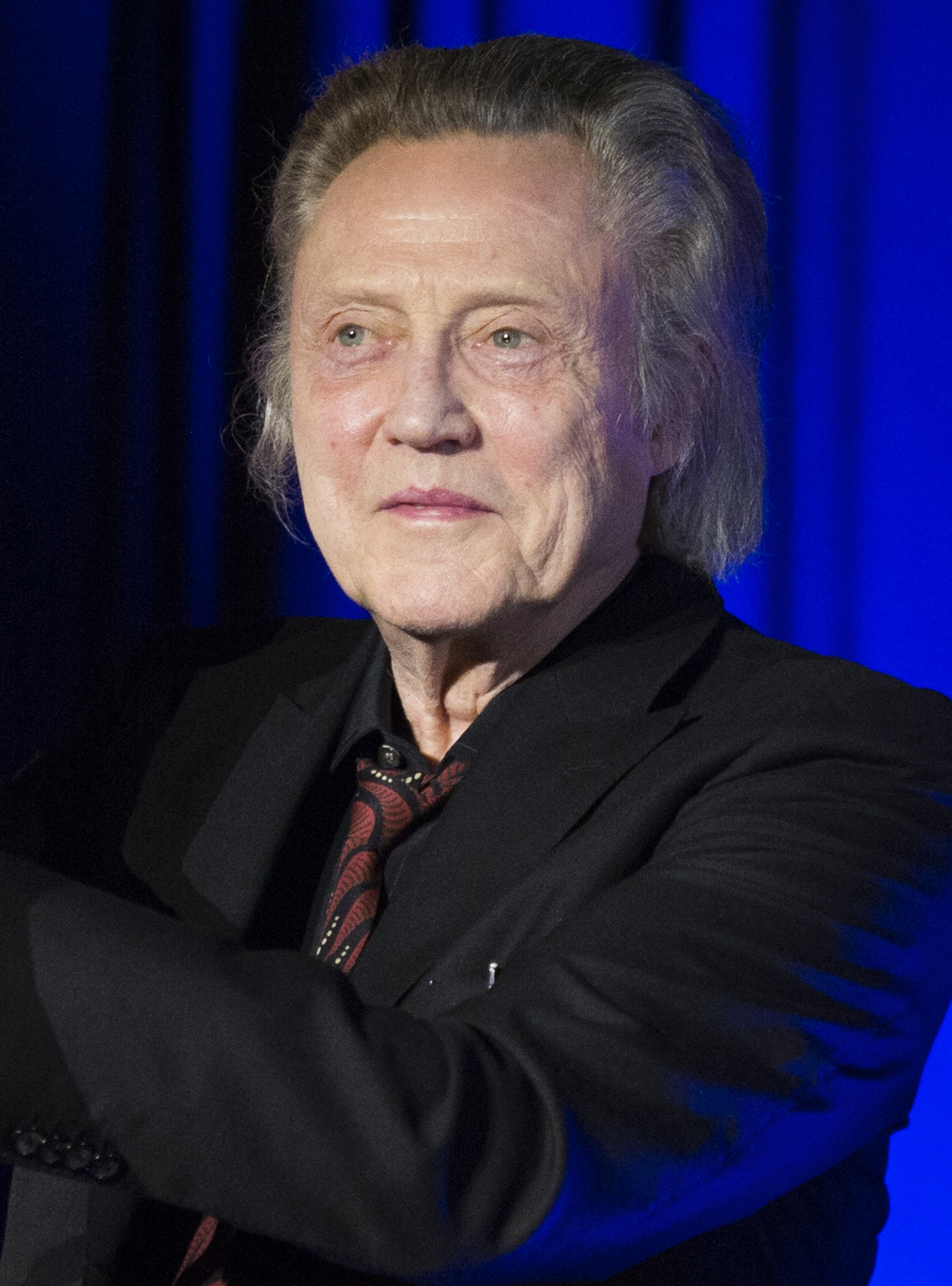
Christopher Walken has hosted SNL seven times.

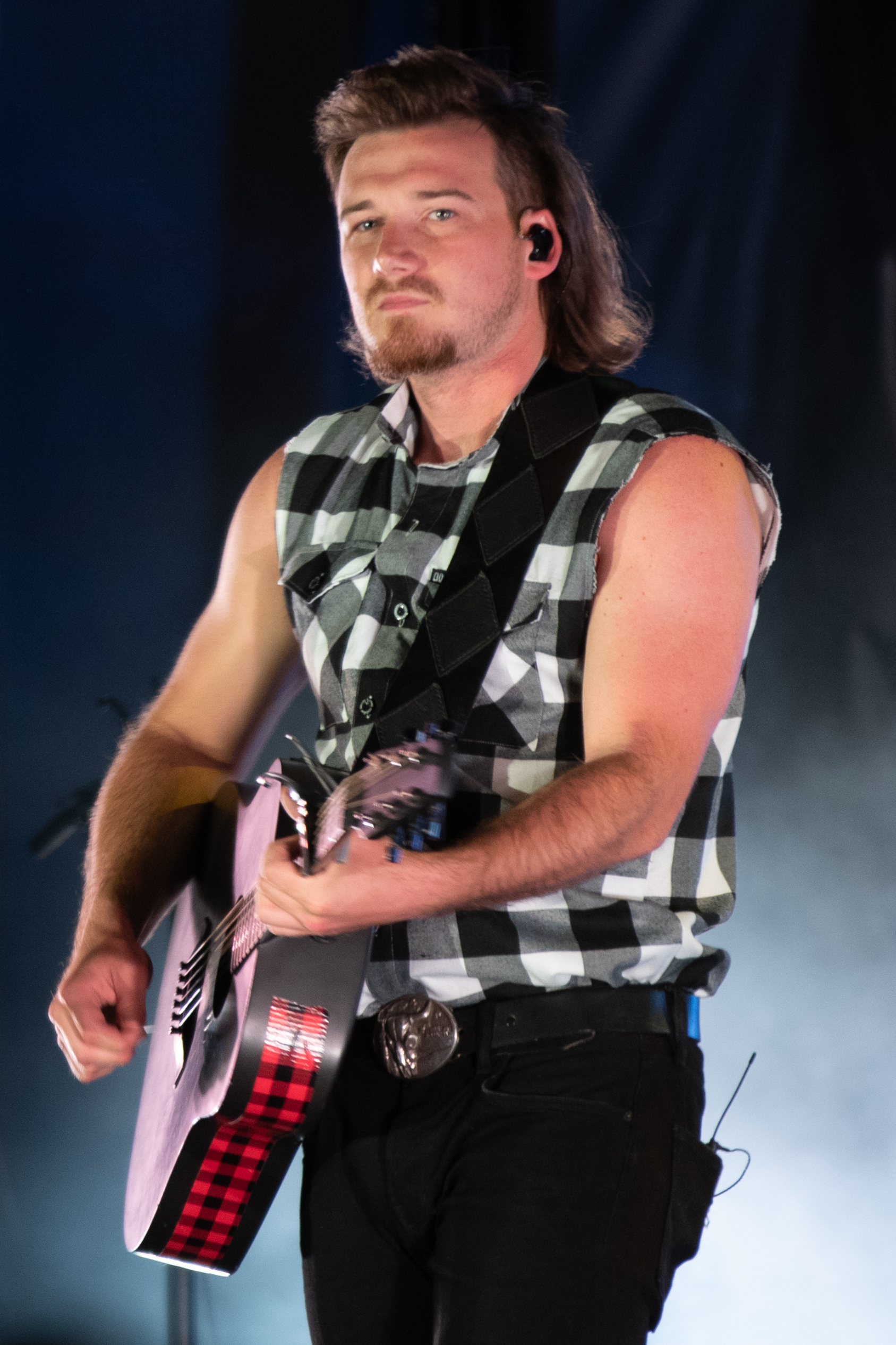
Morgan Wallen was set to appear in October 2020, but was removed for violating COVID-19 safety protocols.

W
Performer	Host	Musical guest	Cameo	First appearance	Notes	Ref(s).
Andrew W.K.		✓		March 22, 2002		
Robert Wagner	✓			December 9, 1989		
Mark Wahlberg			✓	October 19, 2008		
Loudon Wainwright III		✓		November 15, 1975		
John Waite		✓		January 12, 1985		
Tom Waits		✓		April 9, 1977		
Wale			✓	December 14, 2013		
Christopher Walken	✓		✓	January 20, 1990	Member of the "Five-Timers Club"	
Summer Walker			✓	February 24, 2024		
Morgan Wallen		✓	✓	December 5, 2020	Originally set to appear on October 10, 2020, before being removed for violating NBC's COVID-19 safety protocols	
Phoebe Waller-Bridge	✓			October 5, 2019		
Barbara Walters			✓	May 10, 2014		
Christoph Waltz	✓			February 16, 2013		
Wanz			✓	March 2, 2013		
Andy Warhol			✓	October 10, 1981		
Malcolm-Jamal Warner	✓			October 18, 1986		
Jennifer Warnes		✓		May 21, 1977		
Elizabeth Warren			✓	March 7, 2020		
Dionne Warwick			✓	November 6, 2021		
Kerry Washington	✓		✓	November 2, 2013		
Sam Waterston			✓	November 18, 1995		
Muse Watson			✓	November 21, 1998		
Andrew Watt			✓	April 25, 2020		
J. J. Watt	✓			February 1, 2020		
Damon Wayans	✓			April 8, 1995	Former cast member	
Carl Weathers	✓		✓	January 30, 1988		
Sigourney Weaver	✓			October 11, 1986		
The Weeknd		✓		October 10, 2015		
Marc Weiner			✓	February 21, 1981		
Raquel Welch	✓			April 24, 1976		
David Wells			✓	December 1, 2001		
George Wendt	✓			March 22, 1986		
Kanye West		✓		May 18, 2013		
Paul Westerberg		✓		December 4, 1993		
The Whiffenpoofs			✓	December 12, 1981		
Forest Whitaker	✓			February 10, 2007		
The White Stripes		✓		October 19, 2002		
Betty White	✓		✓	May 8, 2010		
Jack White		✓	✓	October 19, 2002		
Rondell White			✓	December 13, 1997		
Shaun White			✓	October 1, 2022		
Bradley Whitford			✓	December 14, 2002		
Steve Whitmire			✓	December 18, 2004	As the voice of Kermit the Frog	
Kristen Wiig	✓		✓	May 11, 2013	Former cast member; member of the "Five-Timers Club"	
Wilco		✓		March 1, 2008		
Olivia Wilde			✓	May 21, 2011		
Fred Willard	✓			October 14, 1978		
Allison Williams			✓	November 3, 2007		
Brian Williams	✓		✓	November 3, 2007		
Cindy Williams			✓	February 20, 1977		
Deniece Williams		✓		April 7, 1984		
Gerald Williams			✓	December 13, 1997	Non-speaking role	
Robin Williams	✓		✓	February 11, 1984		
Tyler James Williams			✓	October 4, 2003		
Walter Williams			✓	February 28, 1976	As the voice of Mr. Bill	
Wendy Williams			✓	May 4, 2024		
Bruce Willis	✓		✓	September 30, 1989		
Andrew Wilson			✓	October 2, 2021		
Brian Wilson		✓		November 27, 1976		
Flip Wilson	✓			December 10, 1983		
Luke Wilson	✓		✓	October 2, 2021		
Owen Wilson	✓		✓	October 2, 2021		
Rainn Wilson	✓			February 24, 2007		
Dave Winfield			✓	October 13, 1984		
Oprah Winfrey	✓			April 12, 1986		
Debra Winger	✓			March 24, 1990		
Henry Winkler			✓	December 3, 1994		
Kate Winslet	✓			October 20, 2004		
Dean Winters			✓	November 19, 2024		
Bill Withers		✓		January 17, 1976		
Reese Witherspoon	✓			September 29, 2001		
Mark Wohlers			✓	December 13, 1997		
Megan Wollover			✓	October 17, 2015		
Stevie Wonder	✓	✓	✓	May 7, 1983		
Wayne Wonder		✓		May 10, 2003		
Elijah Wood	✓		✓	December 13, 2003		
Jamila Woods			✓	December 12, 2015		
Jimmy Workman			✓	November 20, 1993		
Steven Wright			✓	January 14, 1984		

== X ==
X
Performer	Host	Musical guest	Cameo	First appearance	Ref(s).
Charli XCX	✓	✓	✓	March 5, 2022	
The xx		✓		November 19, 2016	
Xzibit			✓	January 20, 2020	

== Y ==
Y
Performer	Host	Musical guest	Cameo	First appearance	Ref(s).
Gideon Yago			✓	February 4, 2006	
Yeah Yeah Yeahs		✓		April 11, 2009	
Christian Yelich			✓	October 31, 2026	
yMusic			✓	October 13, 2018	
Dwight Yoakam		✓		April 9, 1994	
Young Jeezy			✓	May 17, 2008	
Young Thug		✓		October 17, 2021	
Neil Young		✓		September 30, 1989	
Paul Young		✓		February 14, 1987	

== Z ==
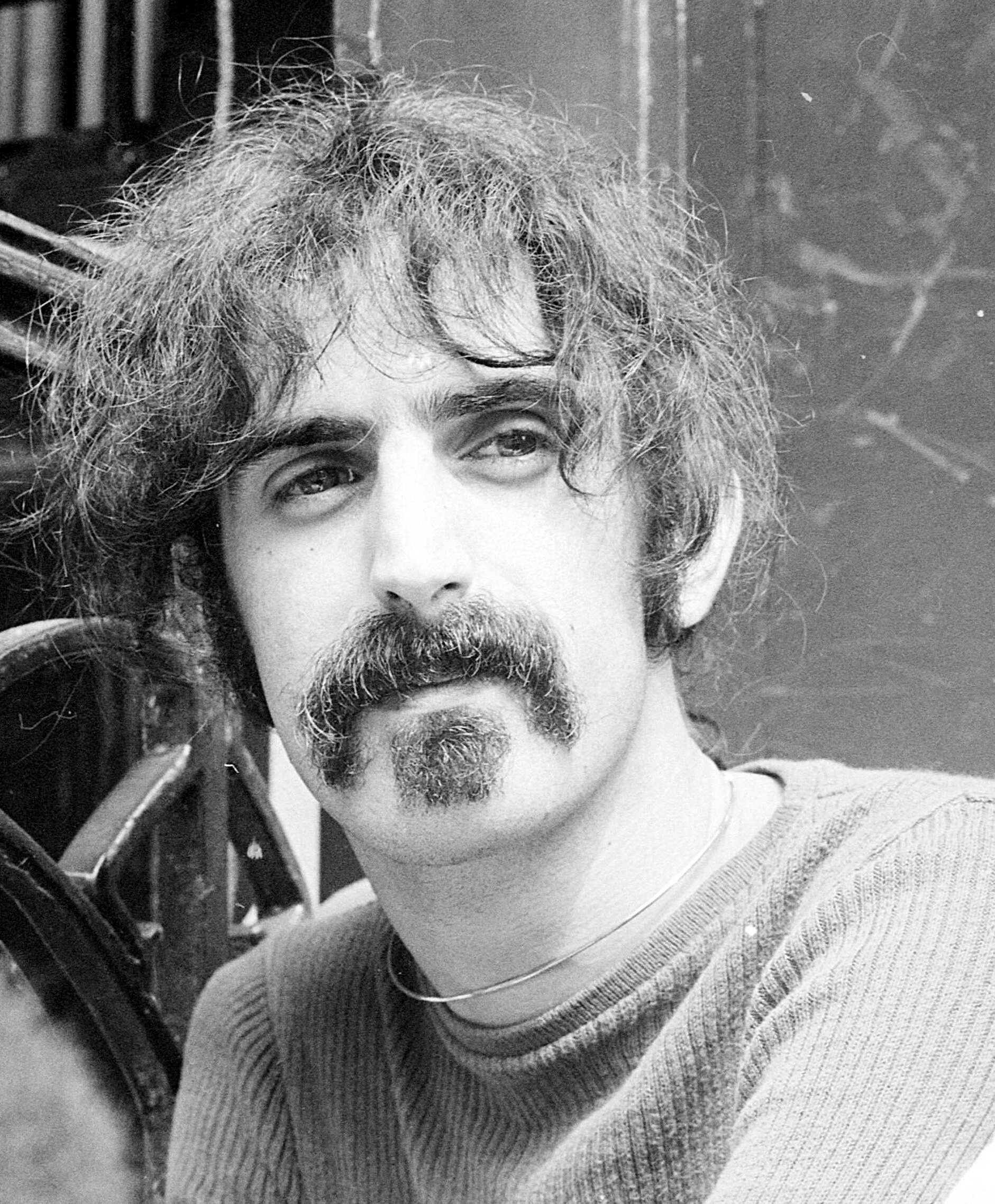
Frank Zappa was banned form SNL after acting unprofessionally.

Z
Performer	Host	Musical guest	Cameo	First appearance	Notes	Ref(s).
Zac Brown Band		✓		March 7, 2015		
Frank Zappa	✓	✓		October 21, 1978	Banned from further appearances for acting unprofessionally on set	
Todd Zeile			✓	December 13, 1997		
Renée Zellweger	✓			April 14, 2001		
Catherine Zeta-Jones	✓			October 22, 2005		
Maddie Ziegler			✓	January 17, 2015		
Mark Zuckerberg			✓	January 29, 2011		
Zwan		✓		April 12, 2003		

== See also ==
- List of Saturday Night Live guests (A–D)
- List of Saturday Night Live guests (E–H)
- List of Saturday Night Live guests (I–L)
- List of Saturday Night Live guests (M–P)
- List of Saturday Night Live guests (Q–T)
