= List of Saturday Night Live guests (A–D) =

The following is a list of people who have been guests on Saturday Night Live. This section consists of people whose surnames start with the letters A to D.

The list below shows the people who have appeared on the show. It is split into three sections: Host, if the person hosted the show at any given time; Musical guest, if a person was the musical guest on the show at any given time; and Cameo, which is for a person who has appeared on the show but did not act as host or musical guest at any given time.

== # ==
Performer	Host	Musical guest	Cameo
070 Shake			✓
10,000 Maniacs		✓	
14 Karat Soul		✓	✓
The 1975		✓	
2 Chainz			✓
21 Savage		✓	
3-D		✓	
3RDEYEGIRL			✓
50 Cent		✓	

== A ==
Performer	Host	Musical guest	Cameo
ABBA		✓	
Adele	✓	✓	
Paula Abdul			✓
Gracie Abrams		✓	
J. J. Abrams			✓
Bella Abzug			✓
AC/DC		✓	
Amy Adams	✓		
Bryan Adams		✓	
Ryan Adams		✓	
Uzo Aduba			✓
Aerosmith		✓	
Ben Affleck	✓		✓
Casey Affleck	✓		
AFI		✓	
Christina Aguilera	✓	✓	
Danny Aiello	✓		✓
Clay Aiken		✓	
Franklyn Ajaye			✓
Akon		✓	✓
Alabama Shakes		✓	
Jessica Alba			✓
Marv Albert			✓
Jason Aldean			✓
Alesso			✓
Jason Alexander	✓		✓
Lamar Alexander			✓
Kim Alexis			✓
All Saints		✓	
Brad Allan			✓
Joan Allen	✓		
Lily Allen		✓	
Kirstie Alley	✓		
The Allman Brothers Band		✓	
Jose Altuve			✓
Ruby Amanfu			✓
Amazing Rhythm Aces		✓	
Tori Amos		✓	
Trey Anastasio		✓	✓
Anthony Anderson			✓
Harry Anderson	✓		✓
Jacob Anderson			✓
John B. Anderson			✓
Laurie Anderson		✓	
Richard Dean Anderson			✓
Michael Angarano			✓
Jennifer Aniston	✓		✓
Anitta		✓	
Ann-Margret			✓
Aziz Ansari	✓		✓
Adam Ant		✓	
Jack Antonoff			✓
Carmelo Anthony			✓
Marc Anthony		✓	
Rick Antonoff			✓
OG Anunoby			✓
Judd Apatow			✓
Fiona Apple		✓	
Christina Applegate	✓		
Arcade Fire		✓	✓
Arctic Monkeys		✓	
Olivia Arias			✓
Giorgio Armani			✓
Ana de Armas	✓		
Joan Armatrading		✓	
Fred Armisen	✓		✓
Lance Armstrong	✓		
Desi Arnaz	✓		
Desi Arnaz Jr.			✓
Will Arnett			✓
Tom Arnold	✓		✓
Rosanna Arquette	✓		
Arrested Development		✓	
Bea Arthur	✓		✓
ASAP Bari			✓
A$AP Rocky		✓	
Ashanti			✓
Ashford and Simpson		✓	
Elizabeth Ashley	✓		
Ed Asner	✓		✓
Dave Attell			✓
René Auberjonois			✓
Awkwafina	✓		✓
Dan Aykroyd	✓		✓

== B ==
Performer	Host	Musical guest	Cameo
Cardi B		✓	✓
The B-52s		✓	✓
David Baas			✓
Bruce Babbitt			✓
Babyface		✓	
Barbara Bach			✓
Backstreet Boys		✓	
Kevin Bacon	✓		
Bad Bunny	✓	✓	✓
The Baha Men			✓
Maggie Baird			✓
Anita Baker		✓	
Alec Baldwin	✓		✓
Alia Baldwin			✓
Stephen Baldwin			✓
William Baldwin			✓
Kelsea Ballerini		✓	✓
J Balvin			✓
The Band		✓	
Antonio Banderas	✓		
The Bangles		✓	
Elizabeth Banks	✓		
Christine Baranski	✓		✓
The Barenaked Ladies		✓	
Sara Bareilles		✓	✓
Nate Bargatze	✓		
Billy Barkhurst			✓
Charles Barkley	✓		✓
Barnes & Barnes			✓
Roseanne Barr	✓		✓
Bill Barretta			✓
Sydney Biddle Barrows			✓
Drew Barrymore	✓		✓
Toni Basil		✓	✓
Kim Basinger	✓		
Richard Baskin		✓	
Bastille		✓	
Mario Batali			✓
Jason Bateman	✓		
Justine Bateman	✓		
Rostam Batmanglij			✓
Roberts Batson			✓
Vanessa Bayer			✓
Beastie Boys		✓	✓
Anne Beatts			✓
Beck		✓	
Jeff Beck		✓	
Ed Begley Jr.	✓		
Marcus Belgrave			✓
Jon Bellion			✓
Jim Belushi			✓
John Belushi			✓
Richard Belzer			✓
Ben Folds Five		✓	
Annette Bening	✓		
Richard Benjamin	✓		
Beck Bennett			✓
Tony Bennett			✓
George Benson		✓	
A. J. Benza			✓
Candice Bergen	✓		✓
Jeff Bergman			✓
Milton Berle	✓		
Corbin Bernsen	✓		
Yogi Berra			✓
Chuck Berry		✓	
Halle Berry	✓		
Valerie Bertinelli	✓		
Beyoncé		✓	✓
Joe Biden			✓
Justin Bieber	✓	✓	✓
Hailey Bieber			✓
Jessica Biel			✓
Big Country		✓	
Big Daddy Kane		✓	
Big Sean		✓	✓
Big Show			✓
Big Wet			✓
Stephen Bishop		✓	
Björk		✓	
Jack Black	✓	✓	✓
Karen Black	✓		
The Black Crowes		✓	
Black Eyed Peas		✓	
The Black Keys		✓	
Deb Blair			✓
Eubie Blake		✓	
Robert Blake	✓		
Benny Blanco			✓
Bleachers		✓	
Cora Blige			✓
Mary J. Blige		✓	✓
Blind Melon		✓	
Blink-182		✓	
Blondie		✓	
Mike Bloomberg			✓
Blues Traveler		✓	
Emily Blunt	✓		✓
James Blunt		✓	
B.o.B			✓
Bob and Ray			✓
BoDeans			✓
Muggsy Bogues			✓
Manute Bol			✓
Usain Bolt			✓
Michael Bolton		✓	✓
Bon Iver		✓	
Bon Jovi		✓	✓
Jon Bon Jovi	✓	✓	
Julian Bond	✓		
Bobby Bonilla			✓
Bono		✓	✓
Benson Boone		✓	
Bootsy's Rubber Band			✓
Pedro Borbón Jr.			✓
David Boreanaz			✓
Ernest Borgnine			✓
Chadwick Boseman	✓		
Barry Bostwick	✓		
Monk Boudreaux			✓
David Bowie		✓	✓
John Boyega			✓
Boygenius		✓	
Lara Flynn Boyle	✓		
Peter Boyle	✓		✓
Boyz II Men		✓	
Don Braden			✓
Bill Bradley			✓
John Bradley			✓
Tom Brady	✓		
Zach Braff	✓		
Bonnie Bramlett			✓
Russell Brand	✓		
Laura Branigan		✓	
John Brannon			✓
Nicholas Braun			✓
The Bravados			✓
Alex Bregman			✓
Kevin Brennan			✓
Jimmy Breslin	✓		
Brick		✓	
Edie Brickell		✓	
Edie Brickell & New Bohemians		✓	
Beau Bridges	✓		
Jeff Bridges	✓		
Lloyd Bridges			✓
Mikal Bridges			✓
Nelson Briles			✓
Matthew Broderick	✓		✓
Adrien Brody	✓		
Elliot Brody			✓
Rachel Brosnahan	✓		
Tom Brokaw			✓
Josh Brolin	✓		
Valri Bromfield			✓
Albert Brooks			✓
Garth Brooks	✓	✓	✓
James L. Brooks			✓
Pierce Brosnan	✓		
Joyce Brothers			✓
A. Whitney Brown			✓
Bobby Brown		✓	
Chris Brown		✓	
Clarence "Gatemouth" Brown			✓
James Brown		✓	
Junior Brown			✓
Larry Brown			✓
Sterling K. Brown	✓		
Yvette Nicole Brown			✓
Jackson Browne		✓	
Carrie Brownstein			✓
Bruce Hornsby and The Range		✓	
Bruce Springsteen and The E Street Band		✓	
Jalen Brunson	✓		
Quinta Brunson	✓		
Aidy Bryant			✓
BTS		✓	
Michael Bublé		✓	✓
Lindsey Buckingham		✓	✓
Michael Buffer			✓
Jimmy Buffett		✓	
Hannibal Buress			✓
Tituss Burgess			✓
Clem Burke		✓	✓
Delta Burke	✓		
Carol Burnett			✓
Jack Burns	✓		
Bill Burr	✓		
William S. Burroughs			✓
Ellen Burstyn	✓		
The Busboys		✓	
Steve Buscemi	✓		✓
Gary Busey	✓		
Timothy Busfield			✓
Bush		✓	
George H. W. Bush			✓
George W. Bush			✓
Kate Bush		✓	
Dick Butkus			✓
Austin Butler	✓		✓
Gerard Butler	✓		
Win Butler			✓
Joey Buttafuoco			✓
Paul Butterfield		✓	✓
David Byrne		✓	
Gabriel Byrne	✓		

== C ==
Performer	Host	Musical guest	Cameo
C+C Music Factory		✓	
Louis C.K.	✓		
Sid Caesar	✓		
Nicolas Cage	✓		✓
Colbie Caillat			✓
Jiggly Caliente			✓
James Cameron			✓
Tyler Cameron			✓
Laura Campbell			✓
Naomi Campbell			✓
Nell Campbell			✓
Neve Campbell	✓		
Tevin Campbell		✓	
John Candy	✓		✓
Dyan Cannon	✓		
Captain Beefheart and The Magic Band		✓	
Alessia Cara		✓	
Steve Carell	✓		✓
Mariah Carey		✓	
Brandi Carlile		✓	
George Carlin	✓		
Jerrod Carmichael	✓		
John Carpenter			✓
Sabrina Carpenter	✓	✓	✓
David Carradine	✓		
Leslie Carrara-Rudolph			✓
Jim Carrey	✓		✓
The Cars		✓	
Betty Carter		✓	
Dana Carvey	✓		✓
Julian Casablancas			✓
Case			✓
Johnny Cash	✓		✓
June Carter Cash			✓
Rosanne Cash		✓	
Dick Cavett	✓		✓
Cee Lo Green		✓	
John Cena	✓		✓
Timothée Chalamet	✓	✓	✓
Jackie Chan	✓		
Chance the Rapper	✓	✓	✓
The Chainsmokers		✓	
Graham Chapman			✓
Tracy Chapman		✓	
Dave Chappelle	✓		✓
Jeannette Charles			✓
Ray Charles	✓	✓	
The Charlie Daniels Band		✓	
Annazette Chase			✓
Chevy Chase	✓		✓
Jessica Chastain	✓		
Don Cheadle	✓		
Cheap Trick		✓	
Cher		✓	✓
Eagle Eye Cherry		✓	
Chicago		✓	
The Chieftains		✓	
Chris Christie			✓
Cheetah Chrome			✓
Ciara		✓	
James Ciccone			✓
Eric Clapton		✓	
Caitlin Clark			✓
Gary Clark Jr.		✓	
Emilia Clarke			✓
Kelly Clarkson		✓	
Patricia Clarkson			✓
The Clash		✓	
Claud			✓
Andrew Dice Clay	✓		
Jill Clayburgh	✓		
John Cleese			✓
Ellen Cleghorne			✓
Roger Clemens			✓
Jimmy Cliff		✓	
Hillary Clinton			✓
George Clooney	✓		
Glenn Close	✓		✓
James Coburn	✓		
Johnnie Cochran			✓
Bruce Cockburn		✓	
Joe Cocker		✓	
Andy Cohen			✓
Sacha Baron Cohen			✓
Marc Cohn			✓
Stephen Colbert			✓
Coldplay		✓	
Paula Cole		✓	
Dabney Coleman	✓		
Gary Coleman			✓
Lisa Coleman			✓
Ornette Coleman		✓	
Chris Colfer			✓
Jacob Collier			✓
Bootsy Collins		✓	
Harlan Collins		✓	
Judy Collins		✓	
Color Me Badd		✓	
Luke Combs		✓	
The Commodores		✓	
Common			✓
David Cone			✓
Didi Conn			✓
Harry Connick Jr.		✓	
Robert Conrad	✓		
Consequence			✓
Bert Convy			✓
Ry Cooder		✓	
Dane Cook	✓		
David Cook		✓	
Peter Cook	✓		
Rita Coolidge		✓	
Coolio		✓	
Anderson Cooper			✓
Bradley Cooper	✓		✓
Leroy Cooper			✓
David Copperfield			✓
Francis Ford Coppola	✓		
Barbara Corcoran			✓
James Corden			✓
Marty Cordova			✓
Chris Cornell			✓
The Corrs		✓	
Howard Cosell	✓		
Bob Costas			✓
Elvis Costello		✓	✓
Nikolaj Coster-Waldau			✓
John Cougar Mellencamp		✓	
Counting Crows		✓	
Allen Covert			✓
Cowboy Junkies		✓	
Simon Cowell			✓
Courteney Cox	✓		
Daniel Craig	✓		✓
Bryan Cranston	✓		✓
The Cranberries		✓	
Crash Test Dummies		✓	
Broderick Crawford	✓		
Chace Crawford			✓
Cindy Crawford			✓
Connie Crawford			✓
Hank Crawford			✓
Creed		✓	
Richard Crenna			✓
Dan Crenshaw			✓
Andrae Crouch		✓	
Sandra Crouch		✓	
Sheryl Crow		✓	
Russell Crowe	✓		
Julee Cruise		✓	
Billy Crystal	✓		✓
Mark Cuban			✓
Kid Cudi		✓	✓
Kieran Culkin	✓		✓
Macaulay Culkin	✓		
Robert Culp	✓		
The Cult		✓	
Benedict Cumberbatch	✓		✓
Alan Cumming	✓		
Jim Cummings			✓
The Cure		✓	
Tim Curry	✓		
Jane Curtin			✓
Jackie Curtis			✓
Jamie Lee Curtis	✓		✓
Joan Cusack			✓
André Cymone			✓
Cypress Hill		✓	
Miley Cyrus	✓	✓	✓
Tish Cyrus			✓

== D ==
Performer	Host	Musical guest	Cameo
D'Angelo		✓	
Terence Trent D'Arby		✓	
Vincent D'Onofrio			✓
DaBaby		✓	✓
Willem Dafoe	✓		✓
E.G. Daily		✓	
Dallas Cowboys Cheerleaders			✓
Ray Dalton			✓
Carson Daly			✓
Johnny Damon			✓
Matt Damon	✓		✓
Claire Danes	✓		
Rodney Dangerfield	✓		✓
Jeff Daniels	✓		✓
Stormy Daniels	✓	✓	✓
Rick Danko		✓	✓
Blythe Danner	✓		
Danny Boy			✓
Paul Dano			✓
Ted Danson	✓		✓
Tony Danza	✓		✓
Ron Darling			✓
Dave Matthews Band		✓	
Michael Daves		✓	
Larry David	✓		✓
Amy Davidson			✓
Pete Davidson	✓		✓
Chili Davis			✓
Geena Davis	✓		
Michael Davis			✓
Miles Davis		✓	
Russ Davis			✓
Tom Davis			✓
Ken Davitian			✓
Rosario Dawson	✓		
Charlie Day	✓		✓
Robert De Niro	✓		✓
Clive Deamer			✓
Greg Dean			✓
Olivia Dean		✓	
Death Cab for Cutie		✓	
El DeBarge			✓
Ariana DeBose	✓		
Deee-Lite		✓	
Calvert DeForest			✓
Ellen DeGeneres	✓		
Vance DeGeneres			✓
Lana Del Rey		✓	
Benicio del Toro			✓
Brian Dennehy			✓
Bruce Dern	✓		
Laura Dern			✓
Des'ree		✓	
Heather Desaulniers			✓
Desmond Child and Rouge		✓	
Zooey Deschanel	✓		✓
Destiny's Child		✓	
Blu DeTiger			✓
Mink DeVille		✓	
Danny DeVito	✓		✓
Julia DeVito			✓
Karla DeVito			✓
Devo		✓	
Dexys Midnight Runners		✓	
Susan Dey	✓		
Neil Diamond			✓
Cameron Diaz	✓		✓
Leonardo DiCaprio			✓
Dez Dickerson			✓
Eric Dickerson			✓
Angie Dickinson	✓		
Diddy		✓	
Diddy-Dirty Money		✓	
Dido			✓
David Diehl			✓
Dijon		✓	
Denny Dillon			✓
Matt Dillon	✓		
Ryan Dillon			✓
Peter Dinklage	✓		✓
The Dirt Band		✓	
Disclosure		✓	
Andrew Dismukes			✓
Mike Ditka			✓
The Dixie Chicks		✓	
DJ Khaled		✓	✓
DMX		✓	
Christopher Dodd			✓
Shannen Doherty	✓		
Doja Cat		✓	
Thomas Dolby			✓
Bob Dole			✓
Elizabeth Dole			✓
Colman Domingo	✓		
The Donnas		✓	
The Doobie Brothers		✓	
Jonathan Dorn			✓
Kirk Douglas	✓		
Michael Douglas	✓		✓
Brad Dourif			✓
Tony Dow			✓
Jim Downey			✓
Roma Downey	✓		
Morton Downey Jr.			✓
Robert Downey Jr.	✓		
Robert Downey Sr.			✓
Brian Doyle-Murray			✓
Imagine Dragons		✓	
Dr. Demento			✓
Dr. Dre		✓	
Dr. John		✓	
Drake	✓	✓	
Rachel Dratch			✓
The Dream Academy		✓	
Fran Drescher			✓
Dylan Dreyer			✓
Richard Dreyfuss	✓		
Adam Driver	✓		✓
David Duchovny	✓		
Duffy		✓	
Jean Dujardin			✓
Lena Dunham	✓		
Nora Dunn			✓
Griffin Dunne	✓		✓
Kirsten Dunst	✓		✓
Duran Duran		✓	
Christopher Durang			✓
Robert Duvall			✓
Shelley Duvall	✓		✓
Bob Dylan		✓	

== See also ==
- List of Saturday Night Live guests (E–H)
- List of Saturday Night Live guests (I–L)
- List of Saturday Night Live guests (M–P)
- List of Saturday Night Live guests (Q–T)
- List of Saturday Night Live guests (U–Z)
