= Don Janse =

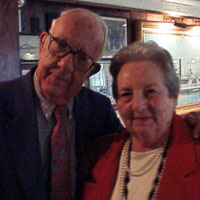
Don and Helen Janse at the Griswold Inn, April 17, 1998

Donald L. "Don" Janse (November 28, 1929 – August 11, 1999) was a famous vocal director and arranger from Old Lyme, Connecticut. He was best known for his work at the United States Coast Guard Academy, where he directed The Idlers from 1957 until his retirement in 1987. Over the years, he entertained Presidents and Kings.

In later years, he directed the Don Janse Chorale and wrote many original pieces for choir. His groups were recorded on the Pickwick and Design labels. The Don Janse Chorale also performed numerous tracks on the Singer (Sewing Machine) Company's first consumer record album - "Favorite Christmas Songs from Singer" (September 21, 1964).

Don Janse died August 11, 1999. His wife Helen (Haskins) Janse (1921–2004), a long-time contributor and regular accompanist to Don's work, died April 28, 2004.
