= The Idlers =

American collegiate a cappella ensemble

The Idlers of the United States Coast Guard Academy (USCGA) are an all-male collegiate a cappella ensemble specializing in the performance of sea shanties and patriotic music.

== Overview ==
A relatively exclusive group with a history and traditions similar to many fraternal organizations, the Idlers are the only all-male a cappella vocal group at the U. S. Coast Guard Academy. Membership is attained through annual auditions overseen by the current members and the director. Group size varies based on current requirements, but generally includes between 12 and 20 men. The ideal group includes 3 or 4 members for each part: Tenor 1, Tenor 2, Baritone, and Bass. The group began in 1957 with 14 singers, two of which were freshman (4/c cadets). The Idlers have an elected president, who historically was the "pitch" and leads rehearsals in the absence of the director. The vice president was the "vice-pitch", also an elected position.

== History ==
The Original Idlers, circa 1958

=== Founding ===
The Idlers were formed in 1957 by eight members of the USCGA Class of 1959 on summer cruise. They quickly drew the attention of the Academy's bandmaster Don Janse and began building their repertoire and fame. In the fall of 1957, the Idlers membership was extended to all Academy classes, as reflected in this photo, taken several months thereafter. Within two years the Idlers had recorded three vinyl albums (for both the Design and MGM labels), and had performed for President and Mrs. Eisenhower at the White House and on The Bell Telephone Hour (NBC).

=== 1960s ===
Don Janse went back to school in the early 1960s and John Heffermann briefly directed the Idlers. When Don returned he brought a number of new tunes which would soon become Idlers staples, including arrangements of Banua, The First Time I Ever, and the Coast Guard Hymn.

=== 1970s ===
The 1970s saw a resurgence of interest in folk music. Patterned after The Kingston Trio, a splinter group known as The New London Trio performed with guitar, upright bass, and banjo. The Idlers sang at the re-interment of Captain Hopley Yeaton, the father of the Coast Guard, on October 19, 1975. The Singing Idlers made an appearance on Saturday Night Live on February 28, 1976, where Leon Redbone was the musical guest, and the hostess Jill Clayburgh sang "Sea Cruise" backed by the group. During the Academy centennial in 1976, several reunion attendees and other Idlers living nearby performed at a black tie dinner held at the Norwich Sheraton – arguably the first reunion of past and present members on the same stage. In January 1977 the Idlers performed at the Smithsonian Air & Space Museum and the American History Museum associated with the Presidential Inauguration of Jimmy Carter.

=== 1980s ===
In both 1980 and 1982, The Idlers performed at Carnegie Hall during Eve Queler's performance of Wagner's Rienzi opera. In 1984, the Idlers and Icebreakers appeared on a sailing ship float with a Statue of Liberty head (and Robert Vaughn) in the Macy's Thanksgiving Day Parade. The 1980s drew to a close with Don Janse's retirement in 1987. Robert G. Newton had been conducting the Idlers sister group, The Icebreakers, and now began directing both groups. Dr. Newton took the Idlers on their first annual tour of Florida in 1989, performing for Magic Music Days at Walt Disney World, and at the Palm Beach International Polo Club, accompanied on the keyboard by then LTjg Mark Dietrich, I'86. The Idlers performed at three Balls during President George H. W. Bush's Inauguration in 1989.

=== 1990s ===
In 1990, The Idlers supported the Coast Guard's Bicentennial celebration with performances at the Senior Bowl in Mobile, AL, and the military tribute ball in Dallas, TX. With the start of the Gulf War, The Idlers supported dozens of USO functions throughout the country, with notable performances in and around New York City, at Ellis Island, and at Fisher's Island in Miami, FL. The Idlers were in such great demand that several quartets were formed, featuring one vocalist for each of the 4 parts. Singing Valentines, intimate dinner parties, accent performances for Flag Dinners – nothing was too small for an Idlers Quartet. The Idlers marched in the November 22, 1990 Macy's Thanksgiving Day Parade with Miss America 1991, Marjorie Vincent. The group performed throughout Washington D.C. during President William J. Clinton's Inauguration in 1993. The group sang aboard the aircraft carrier USS Intrepid as part of the October 24, 1995, tribute to slain leader Yitzhak Rabin.

40th Year Reunion
1998 saw the first stand-alone reunion of The Idlers. Conceived and executed by Edward "Cherry" Beale, I'92, the reunion spanned an entire weekend in April. An opening dinner was hosted at The Griswold Inn in Essex, Connecticut, on Friday night. Some remarked that this was the retirement dinner Don Janse never got. Saturday was filled with rehearsals for the reunion concert in Leamy Hall. The audience was full, and the show was opened by Forebitter of Mystic Seaport. Performances by the current Idlers, quartets, and Trios filled the middle of the program. John Heffermann, then Don Janse took turns conducting the combined 50-voice ensemble. Bob Newton finished the program, then handed out awards and recognition.

=== 2000s ===
The group traveled to New Orleans for a November 9, 2001 USO concert. The Idlers performed from the Parade of Roses' Abe Lincoln float on New Year's Day, 2004. The city of Fort Worth, Texas declared January 13, 2006 to be USCG Academy day in honor of a performance by The Idlers.- Members of the group performed a patriotic salute and the National Anthem in Browns Stadium to a sold-out crowd on September 9, 2007.

50th Year Reunion
The 50th year reunion was held April 18, 2008 at the Griswold Inn, and April 19, 2008 at the Coast Guard Academy. Thirty nine men returned to pay tribute to the 50 classes of graduates, and five decades of spreading goodwill through song.

=== 2010s ===
The Idlers started their 6th full decade with a week-long tour of Italy in March 2010. A recording from a cathedral in Italy served as the basis for their latest CD. In 2011 and 2012, the group completed spring break tours of Florida, with numerous public appearances including Disney World.

== Music ==
=== General ===
The Idlers memorize all their music. The repertoire varies from year to year but typically is heavy on Sea Chanteys and patriotic tunes. The occasional show tune and holiday song round out the mix. The Sea Chanty list is weighted towards capstan songs. Several numbers feature soloists, but a principal concern of all Idlers is the ability to blend well. No individual voice stands out, as they work together to create a smooth and pleasing harmony.

=== Repertoire ===
Core numbers

- Banua
- Eternal Father
- Alma Mater
- Mingulay Boat Song
- The Rattlin' Bog
- The Armed Forces Medley

Regular favorites

- 10,000 Miles Away
- The Idlers Song
- South Australia
- High Barbaree
- A Whale of a Tale
- Drunken Sailor
- Eddystone Light
- The Wild Rover

=== Discography ===
(incomplete, reference)

- Sing Along with The Idlers, 1960, Pickwick
- Americana, 1960, Pickwick
- Blow Ye Winds (with CGA Singers), 1960, MGM
- Songs of Action (with CGA Singers), 1965?, MGM
- Good Times Are Not Over, 1968, CGA
- Songs of Seas and Waterways (with CGA Singers), 1976, CGA
- A Seabag of Songs (with CGA Singers), 1977, CGA
- Cadet Music (with Icebreakers), 1993, CGA
- Cadet Music (with Icebreakers), 1997, CGA
- USCGA Cadet Glee Glub (with Icebreakers), 2004, CGA
- Ten Thousand Miles Away, 2006, CGA

=== Instruments ===
Some performances are augmented by various instruments. An upright bass, banjo, and 12-string guitar are typical – these instruments were the staple of the New London Trio in the mid- and late 1970s. Over the years, The Idlers have also performed with a squeezebox (or concertina), the harmonica (or mouth organ), spoons, washboard, tin whistle, and squeeze-bulb klaxon horn.

== Current members ==
The 2023-2024 members of The Idlers are 1/c Dillion Nitz, 1/c Lucas Stevens, 1/c Mychal Riccio, 1/c Ryan Younes, 2/c Kieth Nico Carreon, 2/c John Rex Gaviola, 2/c Luke Myers, 2/c Nicholas Monahan, 2/c William Nunn, 3/c Miguel Cotto, 3/c Gabriel Cooper, 3/c Aidan Garcia, 3/c Justus Moorlach, 3/c Christian Short, 4/c Ryan Doty, 4/c Anthony Fotos, 4/c Collin Key, 4/c Carson Wirtz.

== Notable and famous Idlers ==
- Edward K. Beale, I'92, Commander, author, helicopter pilot, Idlers historian
- Gary Blore, I'75, Rear Admiral (Bio)
- Dan Burbank, I'85, Captain, Astronaut (Bio), musician
- Everett Rollins, I'79, Captain
- Jerry Cronin, I'80, Musician (Dramtreeo Site)
- Nicholas Dujmovic, I'80, Historian & Author ()
- Frank Giampietro, I'91, Poet ()
- Richard Healing, I'62, Member: NTSB (Article / Article);
- Joel Sipes, I'59, Rear Admiral
- Joseph Vorbach, I'59, Rear Admiral (Bio)
