= List of Saturday Night Live guests (M–P) =

The following is a list of people who have been guests on Saturday Night Live. This section consists of people who fall between the letters M and P.

The list below shows the people who have appeared on the show. It is split into three sections: Host, if the person hosted the show at any given time; Musical guest, if a person was the musical guest on the show at any given time; and Cameo, which is for a person who has appeared on the show but did not act as host or musical guest at any given time.

== M ==
Performer	Host	Musical guest	Cameo
Bernie Mac	✓		
Norm Macdonald	✓		✓
Andie MacDowell	✓		
Seth MacFarlane	✓		
Lonnie Mack			✓
Ian MacKaye			✓
Macklemore		✓	
Kyle MacLachlan	✓		
Elle Macpherson	✓		✓
John Madden	✓		✓
Mickey Madden			✓
Mikey Madison	✓		
Madlib			✓
Madness		✓	
Madonna	✓	✓	✓
Tobey Maguire	✓		
John Mahoney			✓
Ella Mai		✓	
Jonathan Majors	✓		
Wendie Malick			✓
Rami Malek	✓		
John Malkovich	✓		
Måneskin		✓	
Aimee Mann			✓
Archie Manning			✓
Eli Manning	✓		✓
Olivia Manning			✓
Peyton Manning	✓		✓
Joe Mantegna	✓		✓
Julianna Margulies	✓		
Mariachi Vargas de Tecalitlán		✓	
Damian Marley			✓
Maroon 5		✓	
Bruno Mars	✓	✓	
Branford Marsalis			✓
Wynton Marsalis		✓	
Penny Marshall			✓
Billy Martin	✓		
Chris Martin		✓	
Pamela Sue Martin	✓		
Ricky Martin		✓	
Steve Martin	✓		✓
Strother Martin	✓		
Tino Martinez			✓
J. Mascis			✓
Mary Stuart Masterson	✓		
Gaten Matarazzo			✓
Debbie Matenopoulos			✓
Jerry Mathers			✓
Charlie Matthau			✓
Walter Matthau	✓		
Dave Matthews		✓	
John Mayer		✓	✓
Joey Mazzarino			✓
Rachel McAdams			✓
James McAvoy	✓		
Jack McBrayer			✓
Christian McBride			✓
Cindy McCain			✓
John McCain	✓		✓
Melissa McCarthy	✓		✓
Linda McCartney		✓	
Paul McCartney		✓	✓
Delbert McClinton		✓	✓
Matthew McConaughey	✓		
Brian McConnachie			✓
Eric McCormack	✓		
Travie McCoy			✓
The McCrary Sisters			✓
Darryl McDaniels			✓
Dylan McDermott	✓		
Michael McDonald		✓	
Terry McDonell			✓
Jack McDowell			✓
Malcolm McDowell	✓		
John McEnroe			✓
Bobby McFerrin		✓	
The McGarrigle Sisters		✓	
Eleanor McGovern			✓
George McGovern	✓		
Douglas McGrath			✓
Tim McGraw	✓		
Abby McGrew			✓
Michael McKean	✓		
Kathrine McKee			✓
Maria McKee			✓
Ian McKellen	✓		
Mark McKinney			✓
Kate McKinnon	✓		✓
Sarah McLachlan		✓	
Caleb McLaughlin			✓
John McLaughlin			✓
Vince McMahon			✓
Tate McRae		✓	
Taylor Mead			✓
Tim Meadows			✓
Kevin Meaney			✓
Anne Meara			✓
Meat Loaf		✓	
Megan Thee Stallion	✓	✓	✓
Melle Mel		✓	
Milan Melvin			✓
Wendy Melvoin			✓
Men At Work		✓	
Shawn Mendes		✓	
Vic Mensa			✓
Natalie Merchant		✓	
Metallica		✓	
Laurie Metcalf			✓
Paul Mescal	✓		
The Meters		✓	
Method Man			✓
Seth Meyers	✓		✓
MGMT		✓	
Mick Fleetwood's Zoo		✓	
Lorne Michaels			✓
Bette Midler		✓	
Midnight Oil		✓	
The Mighty Mighty Bosstones		✓	
Migos		✓	✓
Miguel		✓	
Mike the Dog			✓
Meek Mill		✓	✓
Marcus Miller			✓
Von Miller			✓
Nicki Minaj		✓	✓
Liza Minnelli			✓
Kylie Minogue		✓	
Lin-Manuel Miranda	✓		✓
Helen Mirren	✓		✓
Father John Misty		✓	
Barry Mitchell			✓
Kel Mitchell			✓
Ty Mitchell			✓
Bentley Mitchum			✓
Robert Mitchum	✓		
Mk.gee		✓	
MØ			✓
Leon Mobley			✓
Moby		✓	
Modest Mouse		✓	
Matthew Modine	✓		
Jason Momoa	✓		✓
Janelle Monáe		✓	
Eddie Money		✓	
Joe Montana	✓		
Kyle Mooney			✓
Demi Moore	✓		✓
Dudley Moore	✓		
Julianne Moore	✓		
Mary Tyler Moore	✓		✓
Rick Moranis	✓		✓
Maven Morgan			✓
Tracy Morgan	✓		✓
Garrett Morris			✓
Maren Morris		✓	
Alanis Morissette		✓	
Van Morrison		✓	
Morrissey		✓	
Rob Morrow	✓		✓
Jonny Moseley	✓		
Elisabeth Moss			✓
The Motels		✓	
Bobby Moynihan			✓
Daniel P. Moynihan			✓
Mr. Hudson			✓
Mr. Mister		✓	
Mr. T	✓		✓
Jason Mraz		✓	
Ms. Dynamite		✓	
John Mulaney	✓		✓
Megan Mullally	✓		
Carey Mulligan	✓		
Dermot Mulroney			✓
Marcus Mumford			✓
Mumford & Sons		✓	
The Muppets			✓
Brittany Murphy	✓		
Charlie Murphy			✓
Eddie Murphy	✓		✓
Pat Murphy			✓
Anne Murray		✓	
Bill Murray	✓		✓
Brent Musburger			✓
Muse		✓	
Kacey Musgraves		✓	
Musical Youth		✓	
Elon Musk	✓		
Maye Musk			✓
Charlie Musselwhite			✓
My Chemical Romance		✓	
My Morning Jacket		✓	
Mystikal			✓
Mike Myers	✓		✓

== N ==
Performer	Host	Musical guest	Cameo
Ralph Nader	✓		✓
Kumail Nanjiani	✓		✓
Nate Dogg			✓
Inde Navarrette	✓		
Kevin Nealon			✓
Liam Neeson	✓		✓
Nelly		✓	
Frank Nelson			✓
Jerry Nelson			✓
Ricky Nelson	✓		
Willie Nelson	✓	✓	
Nelson		✓	
N.E.R.D.		✓	
Michael Nesmith			✓
Ron Nessen	✓		
Graig Nettles			✓
Aaron Neville		✓	
Ivan Neville			✓
The Neville Brothers		✓	
New Edition		✓	
The New Joe Jackson Band		✓	
The New Leviathan Orchestra		✓	
The New York City Children's Chorus			✓
Bob Newhart	✓		
David "Fathead" Newman			✓
Edwin Newman	✓		✓
Fred Newman			✓
Laraine Newman			✓
Randy Newman	✓	✓	✓
Olivia Newton-John	✓	✓	
Casey Nicholaw			✓
Jack Nicholson			✓
Stevie Nicks		✓	
Leslie Nielsen	✓		
Lisa Niemi			✓
Dan Nigro			✓
Leonard Nimoy			✓
Nirvana		✓	
No Doubt		✓	
Klaus Nomi			✓
Noname			✓
Edward Norton	✓		✓
The Notting Hillbillies			✓
Don Novello	✓		✓
Krist Novoselic			✓
NSYNC		✓	
Gary Numan		✓	
Audrey Nuna			✓
Tobe Nwigwe			✓
Diana Nyad			✓

== O ==
Performer	Host	Musical guest	Cameo
Conan O'Brien	✓		✓
Mike O'Brien			✓
Patrick O'Connell			✓
Carroll O'Connor			✓
Josh O'Connor	✓		
Mark O'Connor			✓
Sinéad O'Connor		✓	
Rosie O'Donnell	✓		
Michael O'Donoghue			✓
Catherine O'Hara	✓		✓
Shaun O'Hara			✓
Shaquille O'Neal			✓
Ed O'Neill	✓		
Oasis		✓	
John Oates		✓	
Barack Obama			✓
Ric Ocasek		✓	
Billy Ocean		✓	
Frank Ocean		✓	
Bob Odenkirk			✓
Of Monsters And Men		✓	
Nick Offerman			✓
Natasha Ofili			✓
Sandra Oh	✓		
Olivia			✓
Olodum			✓
Ashley Olsen	✓		
Elizabeth Olsen			✓
Mary-Kate Olsen	✓		
Oneohtrix Point Never			✓
One Direction		✓	
Yoko Ono			✓
Rita Ora			✓
Roy Orbison		✓	
Jenna Ortega	✓		
Bob Orton			✓
Harry Osborne			✓
Joan Osborne		✓	
Cheri Oteri			✓
Outkast		✓	
Rick Overton			✓
Catherine Oxenberg	✓		
Dr. Oz			✓

== P ==
Performer	Host	Musical guest	Cameo
P.O.D.		✓	
Anderson .Paak		✓	
Frankie Pace			✓
Elliot Page	✓		
Jimmy Page			✓
Regé-Jean Page	✓		
Mary Palin			✓
Michael Palin	✓		✓
Sarah Palin			✓
Owen Pallett			✓
Keke Palmer	✓		
Panic! at the Disco		✓	
Gwyneth Paltrow	✓		✓
Joseph Papp			✓
Ashley Park			✓
Kevin Parker			✓
Sarah Jessica Parker	✓		
Bert Parks			✓
Parliament-Funkadelic		✓	
Tayla Parx			✓
Chris Parnell			✓
Jim Parsons	✓		
Dolly Parton	✓	✓	
Pedro Pascal	✓		✓
Passion Pit		✓	
George Pataki			✓
David Paterson			✓
Jason Patric	✓		
Patti Smith Group		✓	
Aaron Paul			✓
Sarah Paulson			✓
Luciano Pavarotti		✓	
Bill Paxton	✓		✓
Julie Payne			✓
Kherington Payne			✓
Trisha Paytas			✓
Walter Payton	✓		
Pearl Jam		✓	
Diana Peckham			✓
Nasim Pedrad			✓
Paula Pell			✓
Clara Peller			✓
Janice Pendarvis			✓
Michael Penn			✓
Sean Penn	✓		✓
Penn & Teller			✓
Peppermint			✓
Anthony Perkins	✓		
Rosie Perez			✓
Rhea Perlman	✓		✓
Harold Perrineau			✓
Katy Perry	✓	✓	
Luke Perry	✓		
Matthew Perry	✓		
The Persuasions		✓	
Joe Pesci	✓		✓
Bernadette Peters	✓		✓
Al Alen Petersen			✓
Cassandra Peterson			✓
Kim Petras			✓
Tom Petty		✓	
Debbie Phelps			✓
Michael Phelps	✓		
Regis Philbin			✓
Ryan Phillippe	✓		✓
Esther Phillips		✓	
Wintley Phipps		✓	
Phish		✓	
Phoenix		✓	
James Pickens Jr.			✓
David Hyde Pierce	✓		
Kate Pierson			✓
Bronson Pinchot	✓		
Chris Pine	✓		✓
Pink		✓	✓
"Rowdy" Roddy Piper			✓
Joe Piscopo			✓
Brad Pitt			✓
Jeremy Piven	✓		
Mary Kay Place	✓		
Sylvia Plachy			✓
Robert Plant		✓	
Playboi Carti			✓
Aubrey Plaza	✓		✓
Donald Pleasence	✓		
Los Pleneros de la Cresta			✓
Suzanne Pleshette			✓
George Plimpton			✓
Scott Podsednik			✓
Amy Poehler	✓		✓
The Pogues		✓	
Buster Poindexter		✓	✓
Leslie Pollack			✓
John Popper		✓	✓
Paulina Porizkova			✓
Billy Porter			✓
Portishead		✓	
Natalie Portman	✓		✓
Paula Poundstone			✓
Maury Povich			✓
Glen Powell	✓		✓
Power Station		✓	
Emily Prager			✓
Chris Pratt	✓		
Paula Prentiss	✓		
Preservation Hall Jazz Band		✓	
Jaime Pressly	✓		
Billy Preston		✓	
The Pretenders		✓	
Alan Price		✓	
Kelly Price			✓
Margo Price		✓	
Thommy Price			✓
Jason Priestley	✓		
Prime Time			✓
Prince		✓	✓
Princess Elizabeth of Yugoslavia			✓
John Prine		✓	
Freddie Prinze Jr.	✓		
Jeff Probst			✓
Proof			✓
Richard Pryor	✓		
Shelley Pryor			✓
PSY			✓
Public Enemy		✓	
The Pull		✓	
Bill Pullman	✓		
Pusha T			✓

== See also ==
- List of Saturday Night Live guests (A–D)
- List of Saturday Night Live guests (E–H)
- List of Saturday Night Live guests (I–L)
- List of Saturday Night Live guests (Q–T)
- List of Saturday Night Live guests (U–Z)
