= Punkie Johnson =

American actress and comedian (born 1985)

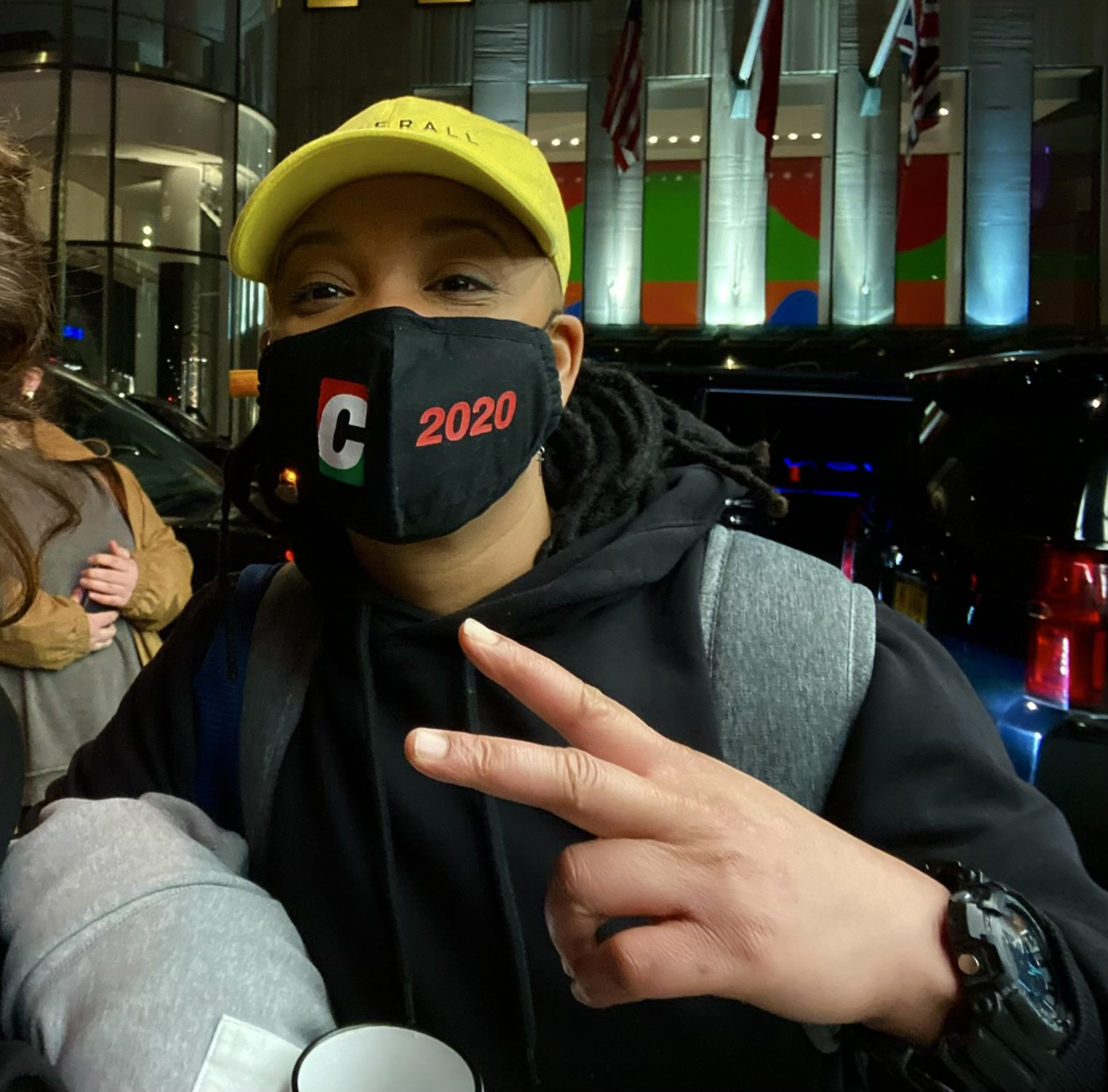
- Johnson in 2021
- Born: Jessica Williams; April 29, 1985 (age 41); New Orleans, Louisiana, U.S.
- Education: Nicholls State University (BA)
- Occupations: Comedian; actress
- Years active: 2015–present

Jessica Williams (born April 29, 1985), known professionally as Punkie Johnson, is an American comedian and actress based in New York City and began her career as a stand-up comedian at The Comedy Store in California. Johnson is best known for being a cast member on the NBC sketch comedy series Saturday Night Live for four seasons, joining its 46th season in 2020 and leaving in 2024 after its 49th season.

== Early life ==
Johnson, born Jessica Williams, is of African American heritage. She was raised by her single mother, Mary Johnson, in New Orleans, Louisiana, attending Catholic and public schools. She graduated from McDonogh 35 High School in 2003.

Johnson studied at Nicholls State University in Thibodaux, Louisiana, where she graduated in 2008 with a bachelor's degree in general studies.

== Career ==
Johnson began her career as a stand-up comedian. She later joined The Comedy Store in Los Angeles as a paid regular. In 2019, Johnson performed at Just for Laughs comedy festival.

As an actress, Johnson has appeared in various television series such as Space Force, A Black Lady Sketch Show, Corporate, and Adam Ruins Everything.

=== Saturday Night Live ===
In 2020, Johnson was cast as a featured player on Saturday Night Live, starting in its forty-sixth season. She was promoted to repertory status in 2022 before the beginning of the 48th season. During that season, Johnson co-wrote the viral song "Big Boys". On Thursday, August 1, 2024, after four years of being a cast member, it was announced that Johnson would not be returning to the show. Her final episode aired on May 18, 2024, with host Jake Gyllenhaal.

== Personal life ==
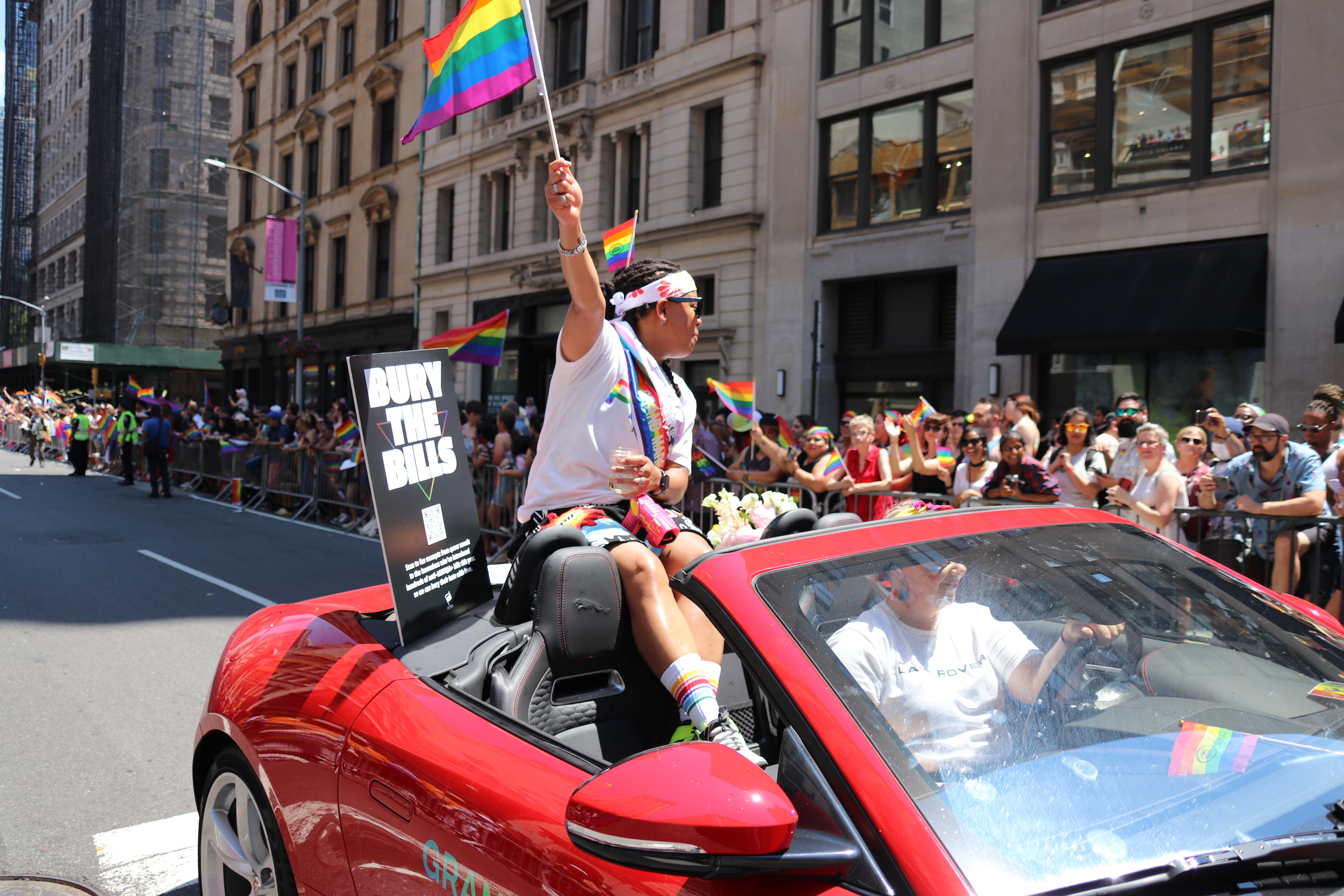
Punkie Johnson at the NYC Gay Pride Parade in 2022

Johnson is a lesbian as well as identifying with the queer community. She and her wife had been partnered since 2002, but in a 2022 episode of the podcast Films To Be Buried With she revealed she was in the middle of divorce proceedings and had since begun a new relationship. In a 2021 interview with NBC News, Johnson affirmed her LGBTQ identity, stating: "I'm just this little lesbian chick from New Orleans who is just enjoying life doing comedy".

== Filmography ==
Film
Year	Title	Role	Notes
2019	The Lot	Punkie	Short film
2020	Sixteen Thousand Dollars	Jo'Nique	Short film
2020	The Adventures of Whit	Detective	Short film
2023	Bottoms	Rhodes	

Television
Year	Title	Role	Notes
2018	Take My Wife		Episode: "Episode 205"
2018	Adam Ruins Everything	Ava	Episode: "Adam Ruins Guns"
2019	Corporate	Taylor the Tattoo Artist	Episode: "The Fall"
2019	A Black Lady Sketch Show	Dance Biter	Episode: "Angela Bassett Is the Baddest Bitch"
2019	Crank Yankers	Shasta	Episode: "Jimmy Kimmel, Kathy Griffin & Jeff Ross"
2020	Bill Burr Presents: The Ringers	Herself	
2020	Space Force	Staff Sergeant Kiki Rhodes	Episode: "Space Flag"
2020–2024	Saturday Night Live	Various characters	Repertory cast member
2021	Love Life	Ida Watkins	Supporting role (season 2)
2022	Ghosts	Ally	2 episodes
2023	Firebuds	Cousin Fanny (voice)	Episode: "Annie Spokely/Ingrid on Ice"

== See also ==
- LGBT culture in New York City
- List of LGBT people from New York City
- NYC Pride March
