= Frederick Pease Harlow =

American sailor and writer

- Born: December 12, 1856; Mount Morris, Illinois, U.S.
- Died: September 10, 1952 (aged 95)
- Occupations: Sailor and writer

Frederick Pease Harlow (December 12, 1856 – September 10, 1952) was an American sailor and writer.

== Early life ==
Harlow was born Mount Morris, Illinois, the youngest of six children of an educator and Methodist minister, William Thompson Harlow, and his wife, Frances Ann Winsor. In 1866, his family returned to Duxbury, where he watched the landing of the French Atlantic Cable Company. He went to school in Bristol, Rhode Island, and he graduated from high school in Newport.

== Career ==
Harlow shipped on the Akbar during two years on a trip to Australia, but he left the sea and went to Chicago. He went to Kansas City where he was an express messenger for some time on the railroad, and then he was express agent in La Junta, Colorado, where he injured his leg by a package thrown into his car. He got a position in the Wells Fargo Express Co. and he was sent to Seattle as agent for the Northern Pacific Railway. During the rest of his life, he studied expert bookkeeping. During World War II, he was accountant for the Washington Shipping Corporation. Between 1928 and 1931, he made four ship models, Akbar, Conquest, Glory of the Seas, and Great Admiral.

He took a three-year trip around the World and wrote The Making of a Sailor (Salem Research Society, 1928), the narrative of his two inaugural voyages, coastwise on New England in 1872 and afterwards to the Far East in the Boston ship Akbar; and Chanteying Aboard American Ships (Barre, Mass.: Barre Press, 1962), based on his lifetime of deepwater experience, prepared and posthumously published at the insistence and under the guidance of Ernest Dodge of the Peabody Museum of Salem, Mass.

== Personal life ==
On February 14, 1898, Harlow was married to Gertrude Gilleland and they had one daughter, Frances Winsor Harlow. He died on September 10, 1952.

== Bibliography ==
- Biographical entry in Encyclopedia of American Literature of the Sea and Great Lakes, edited by Jill B. Gidmark

• Curatorial and exhibition files, Kendall Whaling Museum • Curatorial and exhibition files, New Bedford Whaling Museum • Stuart M. Frank, Jolly Sailos Bold: Ballads and Songs of the American Sailor (East Windsor, NJ: Camsco Music, 2011), passim.
