= The Griswold Inn =

Historic inn in Essex, Connecticut

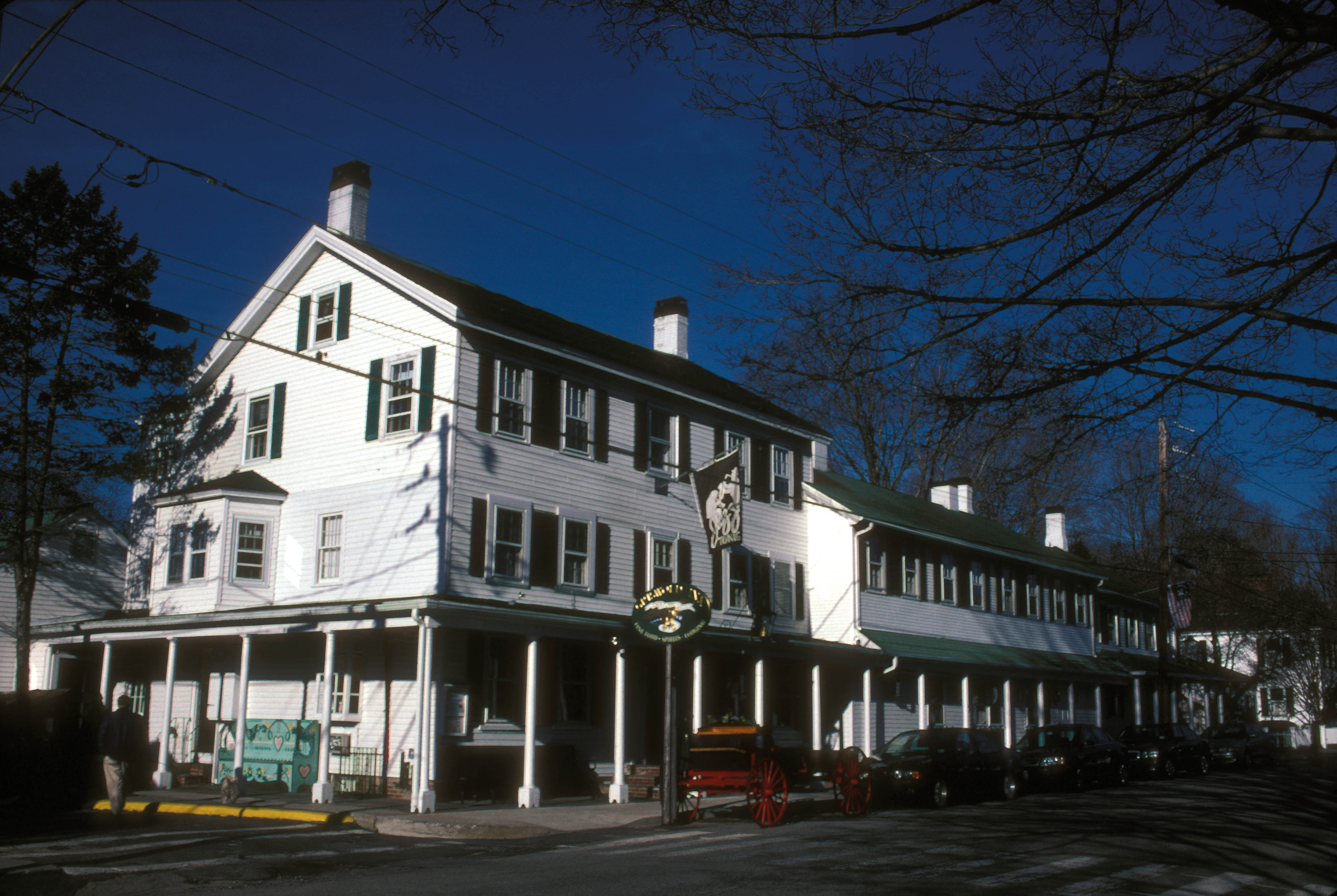

General information
- Location: Essex, Connecticut, 36 Main Street, Essex, CT 06426
- Coordinates: 41.3516°N 72.3868°W

The Griswold Inn is located in Essex, Connecticut and is one of the oldest continuously run inns in the United States. It was founded by three brothers in the late 18th century and named after the Griswold Family of the area, and it has been under the stewardship of only six families. British troops captured it during the War of 1812 and used it as a base of operations. During Prohibition, it still maintained a lively entertainment schedule for the local yachtsmen. Over the years, several surrounding buildings were added to the inn complex, each with its own history. It was also used as a filming location for the gothic soap opera Dark Shadows.

== Historical displays ==
The Griswold Inn sign, May 15, 1999

The walls of the inn hold numerous historical artifacts. Paintings are prominently displayed of famous vessels from the ages of sail and steam, and the Gun Room has a collection of rare firearms. The inn has the largest privately held collection of the works of Antonio Jacobsen, the country's most prolific painter of maritime art.

== Amenities ==
The tavern serves New England cuisine. It serves lunch and dinner on most days, and it features a special Hunt Breakfast on Sundays, a convention which has existed for approximately two hundred years. The Tap Room was built in 1735 as a schoolhouse, but today it offers drinks and casual food as well as live entertainment.

== Sea music ==
The Griswold Inn is known for hosting sea music performances. The Inn has hosted chantey nights for over 50 years and is one of the venues of the Connecticut Sea Music Festival.

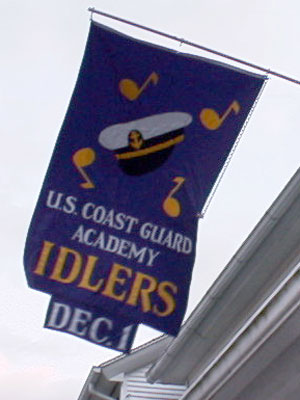

== See also ==
- List of the oldest restaurants in the United States
