= List of Saturday Night Live guests (Q–T) =

Saturday Night Live (SNL) is an American late-night sketch comedy and variety show created by Lorne Michaels. It premiered on NBC on October 11, 1975, under the title NBC's Saturday Night. The show usually satirizes contemporary American popular culture and politics. SNL features a two-tiered cast: the repertory cast members, and newer cast members known as "Featured Players." A typical episode of SNL features a single host, who delivers the opening monologue and performs in sketches with the cast. The format also features a musical guest, and a number of episodes have featured celebrity cameos.

George Carlin was the first to host the show. Candice Bergen was both the first female host in November 8, 1975, and the first to host a second time in December of the same year. On occasion the episode's host also serves as the musical guest; the first was Paul Simon on October 18, 1975. The most recent to pull double duty was Harry Styles on March 14th, 2026. The Rolling Stones are the only band to ever serve as both host and musical guest during the same episode, which aired October 7, 1978. Guests who host five times become members of the Five-Timers Club, introduced on the December 8, 1990, episode, when Tom Hanks became the seventh person to host their fifth episode.

The list below shows the people who have appeared on the show. It is split into three sections: "Host", if the person hosted the show at any given time; "Musical guest", if a person was the musical guest on the show at any given time; and "Cameo", which is for a person who has appeared on the show but did not act as host or musical guest.

== Q ==
Q
Performer	Host	Musical guest	Cameo
Dennis Quaid	✓		
Queen		✓	
Queen Ida		✓	
Queen Latifah	✓	✓	✓
Queens of the Stone Age		✓	
Questlove			✓
Colin Quinn			✓
Zachary Quinto			✓

== R ==
Performer	Host	Musical guest	Cameo
R.E.M.		✓	
Daniel Radcliffe	✓		
Radiohead		✓	
Corinne Bailey Rae		✓	
Issa Rae	✓		
Rage Against the Machine		✓	
Bonnie Raitt		✓	
Mary Lynn Rajskub			✓
Rancid		✓	
Tony Randall			✓
Reneé Rapp		✓	
Thalmus Rasulala			✓
Emily Ratajkowski			✓
Donnell Rawlings			✓
Gene Rayburn			✓
Raye		✓	
Rayvon			✓
Razor Ruddock			✓
Stephen Rea			✓
Ron Reagan	✓		
Ariel Rechtshaid			✓
Eugene Record		✓	
Red Hot Chili Peppers		✓	
Leon Redbone		✓	
Redman			✓
Jason Reed			✓
Lou Reed		✓	✓
Rex Reed			✓
Norman Reedus			✓
Betty Reese			✓
Christopher Reeve	✓		✓
Martha Reeves		✓	
Rei Ami			✓
John C. Reilly	✓		
Rob Reiner	✓		✓
Judge Reinhold	✓		
Paul Reiser	✓		
Rema			✓
Jeremy Renner	✓		
Janet Reno			✓
Jeff Renuado			✓
The Replacements		✓	
Simon Rex			✓
Burt Reynolds	✓		
Ryan Reynolds	✓		✓
Thomas Rhett		✓	
Busta Rhymes			✓
Christina Ricci	✓		✓
Frank Rich			✓
Keith Richards		✓	✓
Miranda Richardson	✓		
Lionel Richie		✓	
Jonathan Richman			✓
Jeff Richmond			✓
Don Rickles	✓		✓
Daisy Ridley			✓
Rob Riggle			✓
Rihanna		✓	
Rikrok			✓
Molly Ringwald			✓
Kelly Ripa	✓		✓
Joan Rivers	✓		
Anthony Rizzo			✓
Chappell Roan		✓	
Margot Robbie	✓		
Tim Robbins	✓		✓
Robert Cray Band		✓	
Robert Plant		✓	
Doris Roberts			✓
Marcus Roberts			✓
Cliff Robertson			✓
Robbie Robertson		✓	
Martin P. Robinson			✓
Robyn		✓	
Roc Raida			✓
The Roches		✓	
Chris Rock	✓		✓
Jay Rock			✓
The Rock	✓		✓
The Rockettes			✓
Kate Rockwell			✓
Sam Rockwell	✓		✓
Andy Roddick	✓		
Nile Rodgers			✓
Dennis Rodman			✓
Olivia Rodrigo	✓	✓	
Alex Rodriguez			✓
Seth Rogen	✓		✓
Buddy Rogers			✓
Charles Rogers			✓
Maggie Rogers		✓	
Al Roker			✓
Scott Rolen			✓
The Rolling Stones	✓	✓	
Rollins Band		✓	
Ray Romano	✓		
Saoirse Ronan	✓		
Mark Ronson		✓	✓
Linda Ronstadt		✓	✓
The Roots			✓
Rosalía		✓	✓
George Rose		✓	
David Ross			✓
George H. Ross			✓
Ronda Rousey	✓		
Kelly Rowland			✓
Badal Roy			✓
Jerry Rubin			✓
Rick Rubin			✓
Paul Rudd	✓		✓
David Rudman			✓
Maya Rudolph	✓		✓
Run DMC		✓	
Todd Rundgren		✓	
RuPaul	✓		✓
Bill Russell	✓		
Leon Russell		✓	✓
Mary Russell		✓	
Winona Ryder	✓		✓

== S ==
Performer	Host	Musical guest	Cameo
Ernie Sabella			✓
Sade		✓	
Bob Saget	✓		
Susan Saint James	✓		✓
Soupy Sales			✓
Salt-N-Pepa		✓	
Sam and Dave		✓	
Andy Samberg	✓		✓
Sampha			✓
Savanna Samson			✓
David Sanborn		✓	
Mark Sanchez			✓
Adam Sandler	✓		✓
Bernie Sanders			✓
Deion Sanders	✓		
Isabel Sanford			✓
Santana		✓	
Alejandro Sanz			✓
Horatio Sanz			✓
Susan Sarandon			✓
Michael Sarrazin	✓		✓
Peter Sarsgaard	✓		✓
Fred Savage	✓		
Joanne Savage			✓
Kala Savage			✓
Leo Sayer		✓	
Boz Scaggs		✓	
Chuck Scarborough			✓
Akiva Schaffer			✓
Roy Scheider	✓		
Richard Schiff			✓
Rob Schneider			✓
Liev Schreiber	✓		✓
George Shultz			✓
Amy Schumer	✓		✓
Chuck Schumer			✓
Arnold Schwarzenegger			✓
David Schwimmer	✓		
Scissor Sisters		✓	
Martin Scorsese			✓
Drew Scott			✓
Jonathan Scott			✓
Seann William Scott	✓		
Tom Scott			✓
Travis Scott		✓	
Gil Scott-Heron		✓	
Steven Seagal	✓		
Seal		✓	
Sean Paul		✓	
Tom Seaver			✓
John Sebastian		✓	
The Section			✓
Neil Sedaka		✓	
Jason Segel	✓		
Streeter Seidell			✓
Jerry Seinfeld	✓		✓
Seka			✓
Brian Setzer			✓
Stephanie Seymour			✓
Paul Shaffer	✓		✓
Shaggy		✓	
Shakira		✓	
Tupac Shakur		✓	
Garry Shandling	✓		
Molly Shannon	✓		✓
Al Sharpton	✓		✓
William Shatner	✓		✓
Charlie Sheen	✓		
Martin Sheen	✓		✓
Ed Sheeran		✓	
Judge Judy Sheindlin			✓
Blake Shelton	✓	✓	
Mike Sherman			✓
The Shins		✓	
Ellen Shipley		✓	
Martin Short	✓		✓
Grant Show			✓
Rosie Shuster			✓
Sia		✓	✓
Gabourey Sidibe	✓		
Beanie Sigel			✓
Jamie-Lynn Sigler			✓
Silverchair		✓	
Sarah Silverman	✓		
J.K. Simmons	✓		✓
Richard Simmons			✓
Carly Simon		✓	
Paul Simon	✓	✓	✓
Paul Simon (politician)			✓
Simple Minds		✓	
Simply Red		✓	
Ashlee Simpson		✓	
Jessica Simpson	✓		
O. J. Simpson	✓		✓
Sturgill Simpson		✓	✓
Molly Sims			✓
Sinbad	✓		
The Singing Idlers			✓
Gene Siskel			✓
Sisqo		✓	
Jeremy Sisto			✓
Troye Sivan		✓	✓
Skid Row		✓	✓
Leland Sklar			✓
Christian Slater	✓		✓
John Slattery			✓
Percy Sledge		✓	
Sleigh Bells		✓	
Jean Smart	✓		
The Smashing Pumpkins		✓	
Pat Smear			✓
Elliott Smith		✓	
G.E. Smith			✓
Patti Smith		✓	✓
Rex Smith		✓	
Sam Smith		✓	✓
Willow Smith		✓	✓
The Smithereens		✓	
Jimmy Smits	✓		
J.B. Smoove			✓
Dick Smothers	✓		
Tom Smothers	✓		
Chris Snee			✓
Snoop Dogg	✓	✓	
Phoebe Snow		✓	
Snow Patrol		✓	
The Social Experiment			✓
Solange		✓	
Soul Asylum		✓	
Soundgarden		✓	
Sissy Spacek	✓		
Kevin Spacey	✓		
David Spade	✓		✓
The Spanic Boys		✓	
Sparks		✓	
Bubba Sparxxx		✓	
Britney Spears	✓	✓	✓
The Specials		✓	
Regina Spektor		✓	
John Spencer			✓
Octavia Spencer	✓		
Sy Sperling			✓
Spice Girls		✓	
Steven Spielberg			✓
Miskel Spillman	✓		✓
Spin Doctors		✓	
Spinal Tap		✓	
The Spinners		✓	
Caroll Spinney			✓
Emily Spivey			✓
Spoon		✓	
George Springer			✓
Bruce Springsteen		✓	
Squeeze		✓	
Billy Squier		✓	
Ken Stabler			✓
Sylvester Stallone	✓		✓
Stanley Clarke Trio		✓	
Harry Dean Stanton	✓		
Chris Stapleton		✓	
Jean Stapleton			✓
Maureen Stapleton	✓		
Morgane Stapleton			✓
Francis Farewell Starlite			✓
Maurice Starr			✓
Ringo Starr	✓		
The Statler Brothers			✓
Gwen Stefani		✓	✓
Chris Stein		✓	✓
George Steinbrenner	✓		
Howard Stern			✓
Fisher Stevens			✓
Ivory Steward			✓
Jon Stewart	✓		
Kristen Stewart	✓		
Patrick Stewart	✓		
Rod Stewart		✓	
Julia Stiles	✓		✓
Ben Stiller	✓		✓
Jerry Stiller			✓
Sting	✓	✓	
Emma Stone	✓		✓
Oliver Stone			✓
Sharon Stone	✓		✓
Stone City Band			✓
Stone Temple Pilots		✓	
Stray Cats		✓	
Barbra Streisand			✓
The Strokes		✓	
Cecily Strong			✓
Penelope Strong			✓
Kerri Strug			✓
Stuff		✓	
Trudie Styler			✓
Harry Styles	✓	✓	✓
The Stylistics		✓	
Suburban Lawns			✓
Jason Sudeikis	✓		✓
The Sugarcubes		✓	
Sum 41		✓	✓
Sun Ra		✓	
David Susskind			✓
Kiefer Sutherland	✓		✓
Mena Suvari	✓		
Hilary Swank	✓		
Lynn Swann			✓
Patrick Swayze	✓		
Mike Sweeney			✓
Sydney Sweeney	✓		
Taylor Swift	✓	✓	✓
Swizz Beatz			✓
Keith Sykes		✓	
Syreeta			✓
SZA		✓	✓

== T ==
Performer	Host	Musical guest	Cameo
T-Pain		✓	✓
T.I.		✓	
Jorma Taccone			✓
Fred Tackett		✓	✓
Taj Mahal		✓	
Take 6		✓	
James Talarico			✓
Talking Heads		✓	
Támar			✓
Tame Impala		✓	
Quentin Tarantino	✓		
Fran Tarkenton	✓		
Brandon Tartikoff	✓		✓
Channing Tatum	✓		
James Taylor		✓	
Rip Taylor			✓
Teyana Taylor	✓		✓
Anya Taylor-Joy	✓		
Technotronic		✓	
Teenage Fanclub		✓	
Miles Teller	✓		
Tenacious D		✓	✓
Annamarie Tendler			✓
Lee Tergesen			✓
The-Dream			✓
Them Crooked Vultures		✓	
Charlize Theron	✓		
Justin Theroux			✓
Toots Thielemans			✓
Third Eye Blind		✓	
Betty Thomas	✓		
Dave Thomas	✓		✓
Elizabeth Thompson			✓
Emma Thompson	✓		
The Thompson Twins		✓	
Billy Bob Thornton	✓		
Marv Throneberry			✓
Cheryl Tiegs			✓
Gary Tigerman		✓	
Charlene Tilton	✓		
Timbaland			✓
Justin Timberlake	✓	✓	✓
Timbuk 3		✓	
The Time		✓	
Tin Machine		✓	
The Ting Tings		✓	
Jacqueline Titone			✓
Libby Titus		✓	
TLC		✓	
Tom Petty and The Heartbreakers		✓	✓
Marisa Tomei	✓		
Lily Tomlin	✓		✓
Tony! Toni! Toné!		✓	
Toots and the Maytals		✓	
Peter Tosh		✓	
The Tragically Hip		✓	
Daniel J. Travanti	✓		
Randy Travis		✓	
John Travolta	✓		
Alex Trebek			✓
Danny Trejo			✓
A Tribe Called Quest		✓	
Triple H			✓
Garry Trudeau			✓
Donald Trump	✓		✓
Ivanka Trump			✓
Stanley Tucci			✓
Brice Turang			✓
Kathleen Turner	✓		
Tina Turner		✓	✓
John Turturro	✓		
TV on the Radio		✓	
Twenty One Pilots		✓	
Ty Dolla Sign			✓
Soozie Tyrell			✓
Cicely Tyson	✓		
Mike Tyson			✓
