= Rembrandt Peale =

American artist and museum keeper (1778–1860)

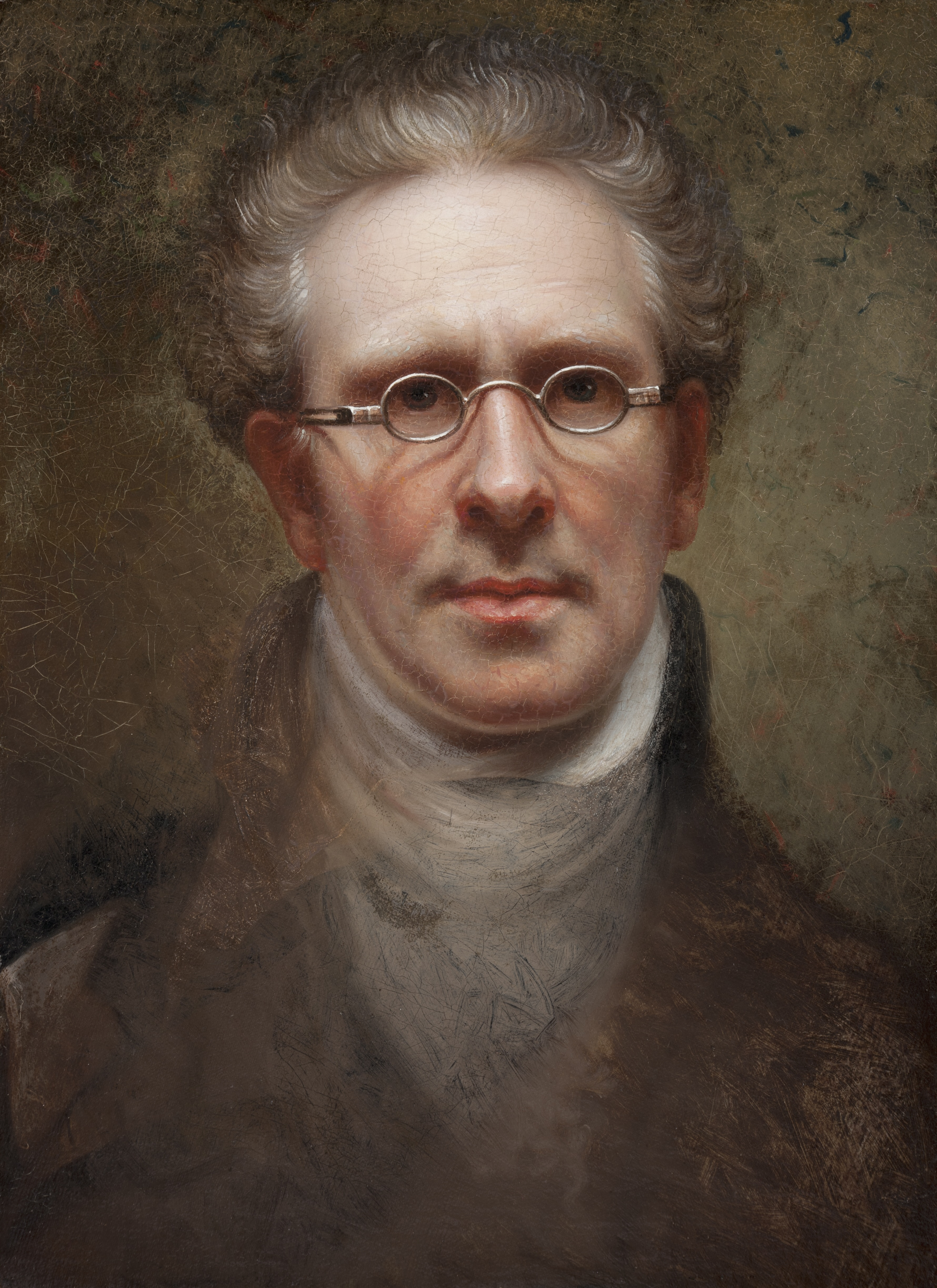
- Self-portrait, 1828, Detroit Institute of Arts
- Born: February 22, 1778; Near present-day Richboro, Bucks County, Pennsylvania, U.S.
- Died: October 3, 1860 (aged 82); Philadelphia, Pennsylvania, U.S.
- Education: Paris (1808), (1809–1810), Great Britain (1832)
- Known for: Artist
- Notable work: Rubens Peale with a Geranium, George Washington, Patriae Pater, Court of Death
- Movement: Neoclassical
- Spouse: Harriet Cany Peale (m. 1840)
- Parents: Charles Willson Peale; Rachel Brewer
- Relatives: Raphaelle Peale (brother); Rubens Peale (brother); Sophonisba Angusciola Peale (sister); Titian Ramsay Peale I (brother); Franklin Peale (half-brother); Titian Peale (half-brother)
- Patrons: Charles Willson Peale, George Washington, Thomas Jefferson, Rubens Peale, John Marshall, John C. Calhoun, Charles Mathews, Jean-Antoine Houdon, DeWitt Clinton, Thomas Sumter

Rembrandt Peale (February 22, 1778 – October 3, 1860) was an American artist and museum keeper. A prolific portrait painter, he was especially acclaimed for his likenesses of presidents George Washington and Thomas Jefferson. Peale's style was influenced by French neoclassicism after a stay in Paris in his early thirties.

== Early life and education ==
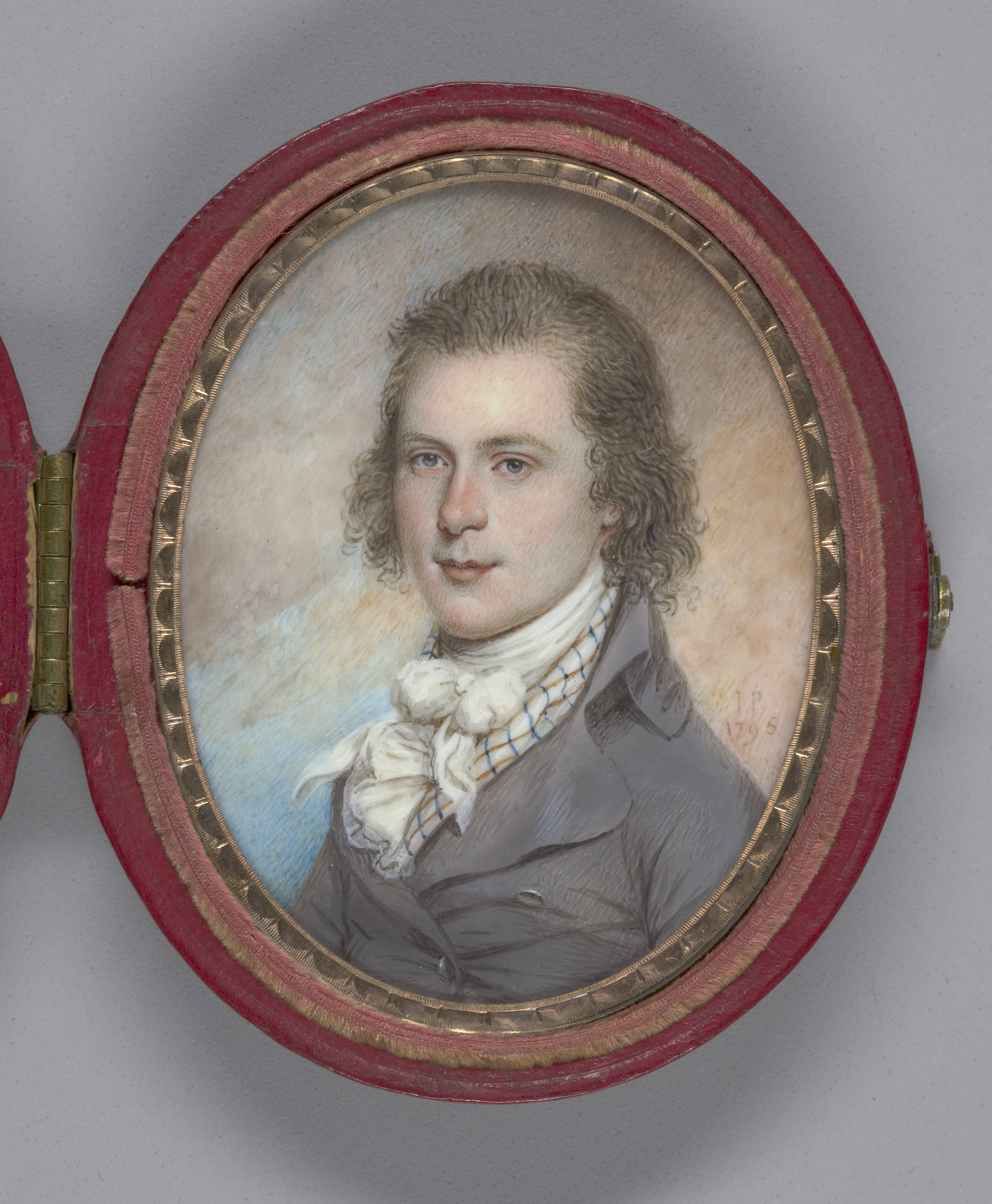
1795 miniature of Peale by his uncle, James Peale

Peale was born on February 22, 1778, near present-day Richboro, Pennsylvania, in Bucks County, Pennsylvania, the third of six surviving children (11 had died) to Rachel Brewer and Charles Willson Peale, in Bucks County. His father was also a notable artist, and named him after the noted 17th-century Dutch painter and engraver Rembrandt Harmenszoon van Rijn. His father also taught all of his children, including Raphaelle, Rubens, and Titian, to paint scenery and portraiture, and tutored Rembrandt in the arts and sciences.

Rembrandt began drawing at the age of eight. A year after his mother's death and the remarriage of his father, Peale left the school of the arts, and completed his first self-portrait at the age of 13. The canvas displays the young artist's early mastery. The clothes, however, give the notion that Peale exaggerated what a 13-year-old would look like, and Peale's hair curls like the hair of a Renaissance angel. Later in his life, Peale "often showed this painting to young beginners, to encourage them to go from 'bad' to better..."

== Career ==
In July 1787, Charles Willson Peale introduced his son Rembrandt to George Washington, and the young aspirant artist watched his father paint the future president. In 1795, at the age of 17, Rembrandt painted an aging Washington, making him appear far more aged than in reality. The portrait was well received, and Rembrandt had made his debut.

In 1822, Peale moved to New York City, where he embarked on an attempt to paint what he hoped would become the "standard likeness" of Washington. He studied portraits by other artists including John Trumbull, Gilbert Stuart and his own father, as well as his own 1795 picture which had never truly satisfied him. His resulting work Patriae Pater, completed in 1824, depicts Washington through an oval window, and is considered by many to be second only to Gilbert Stuart's iconic Athenaeum painting of the first president. Peale subsequently attempted to capitalize on the success of what quickly became known as his "Porthole" picture. Patriae Pater (Latin for "Father of Our Country") was purchased by Congress in 1832 for $2,000. It currently hangs in the Old Senate Chamber.

In 1826, he helped found the National Academy of Design in New York City.

Peale went on to create over 70 detailed replicas, including one of Washington in full military uniform that currently hangs in the Oval Office. Peale continued to paint other noted portraits, such as those of the third president Thomas Jefferson while he was in office (1805), and later on a portrait of Chief Justice John Marshall.

=== Travels ===
Noted for his "itinerant" nature, Peale visited Europe several times to study art (Ward). Throughout his life, Peale traveled across the western hemisphere in search of inspiration and opportunities as an artist. His father helped pay his way to Paris, where he stayed from June to September 1808, and again from October 1809 to November 1810. In Paris, Peale studied the works of Jacques-Louis David, which influenced him to paint in the Neoclassical style. He painted the famous explorer Alexander von Humboldt and several other noted patrons such as Joseph Louis Gay-Lussac and François André Michaux. After his successes in France, Peale returned to Philadelphia in 1810.

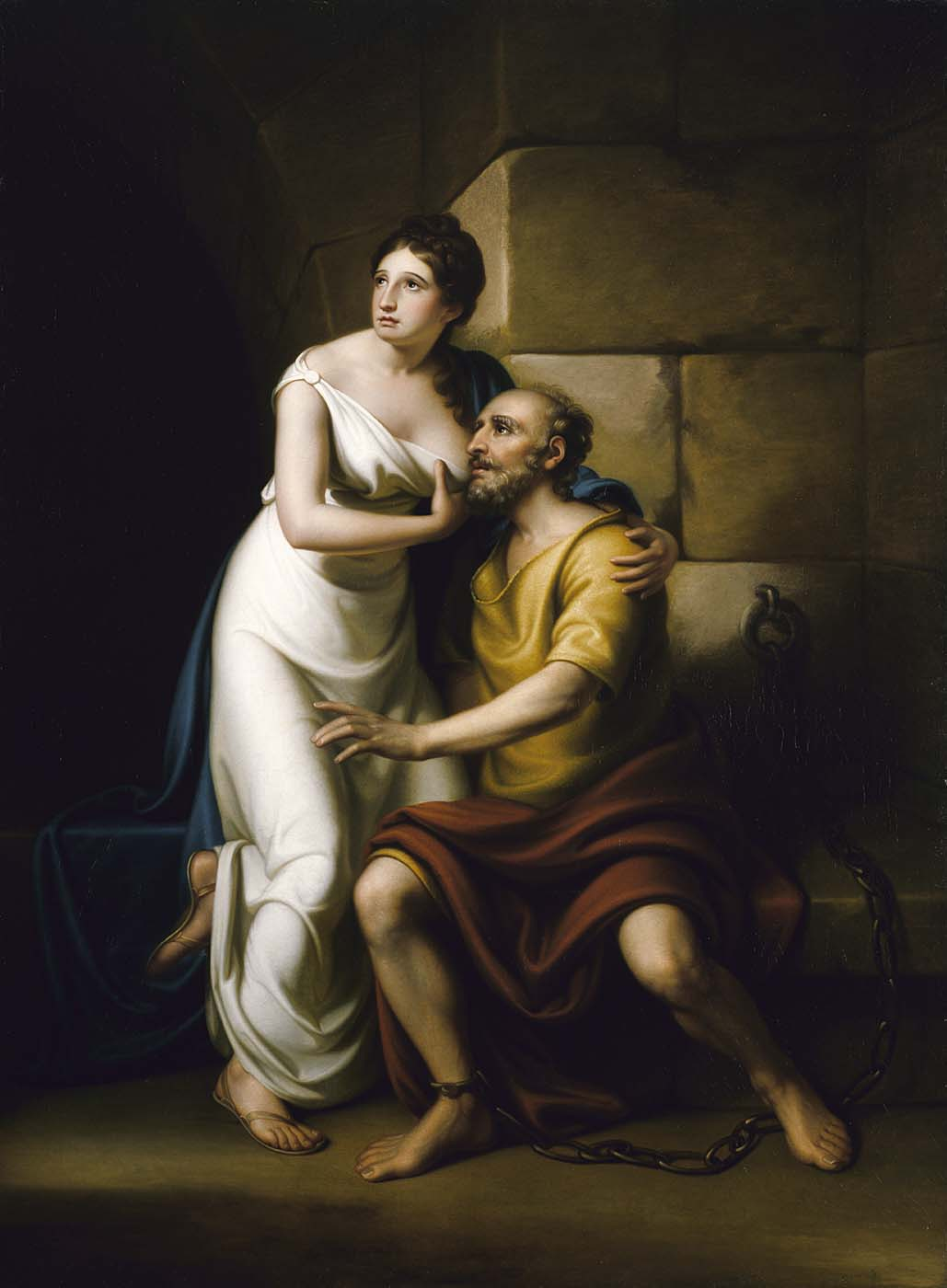
The Roman Daughter (1811)

His efforts to establish his knowledge and mastery of art were displayed in his painting The Roman Daughter (1811). The painting depicts a young girl shielding her father, a prisoner in chains, and feeding him from her breast, the emblem of "Roman Charity" reported in the pages of Pliny. It was deemed too "sensational" by the people of Philadelphia, who were unsympathetic to his endeavors toward "improving the state of fine arts in America" in the 19th century. Amid the economic hardship of the War of 1812, President Jefferson—who promised to buy the 1795 portrait of Washington, but could not keep his promise—instead encouraged Peale to go to Europe, as "we have genius among us but no unemployed wealth to reward it".

=== Peale's Baltimore Museum ===
Motivated by his father's establishment of the Philadelphia Museum (1786) and having been unsuccessful in Philadelphia, Rembrandt Peale assumed his father's role in another city. On August 15, 1814, Peale launched his first museum as soon as he arrived in the municipality of Baltimore, Maryland on Holliday Street between East Saratoga and Lexington Streets, the first building constructed in America to serve as a museum. It later served as the second Baltimore City Hall, 1830–1875; a "Colored" primary, grammar, and high school, part of Baltimore's segregated public school system, 1878–1889; and was restored in 1931 as the Municipal Museum of the City of Baltimore. Renovated and restored again in 1981, it reopened with a groundbreaking interpretive history exhibition, "Rowhouse: A Baltimore Style of Living". In 1985, the Municipal Museum, which had grown to five sites (Peale Museum, Carroll Mansion, 1840 House, Baltimore Center for Urban Archaeology, and H.L. Mencken House) was renamed Baltimore City Life Museums. It closed in 1997, a year after opening a new 30,000sf exhibition center.

The museum was elaborately illuminated by gas light, following the example of his brother Rubens in Philadelphia. This innovation made a great impression. Peale had acquired an important gas lighting patent, and with some associates founded the successful Gas Light Company of Baltimore. Having poor business sense, though, he did little to manage the company and was forced out after a few years due to the War of 1812.

In 1828, an ambitious Peale raised funds and tried earning money for his previous paintings, in order to travel to Rome. He took along his 15-year-old son, Michael Angelo, a determined young artist who copied his father's paintings in admiration. Peale successfully displayed portraits of Horatio Greenough and Washington as Patriæ Pater in the Florentine academy.

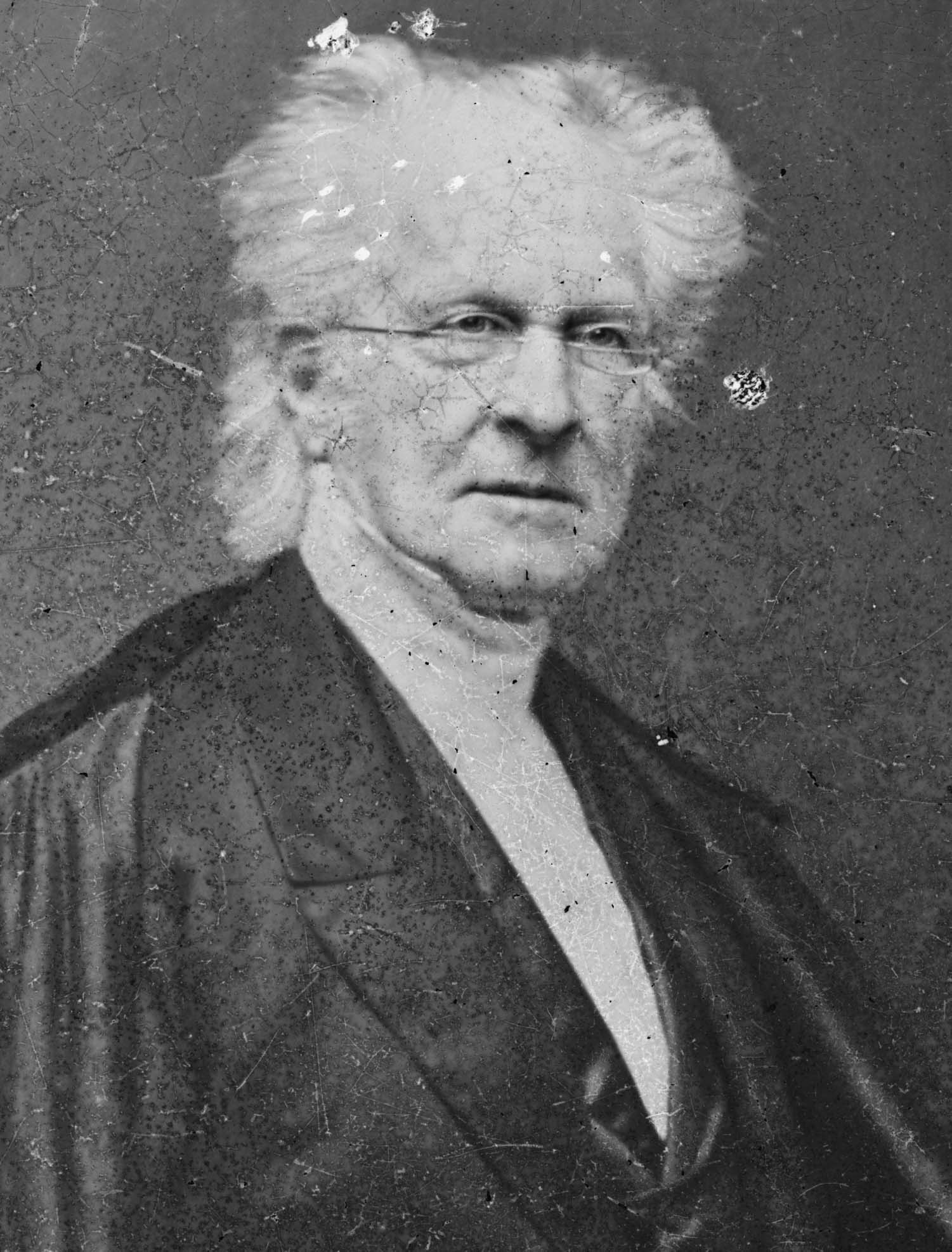
Peale, "the oldest living American artist", captured by Mathew B. Brady in 1855–1860.

In the last years of his life, Peale published memories of his life and travels as a series in The Crayon, an arts periodical. At the age of 82, Peale died on October 3, 1860, at his house on 1506 Vine St in Philadelphia. He is buried at Woodlands Cemetery in West Philadelphia.

=== Works ===
Exhibited and discussed in "In Pursuit of Fame: Rembrandt Peale 1778–1860", Washington D.C., National Portrait Gallery, Smithsonian institution, 1992–93, The portrait of Margaret Irvine Miller exemplifies Peale's ability to convey a story and capture character through taking liberty with the way in which he portrayed his sitters. Mrs. Miller, by birth working-class, later raised her position in Philadelphia society. Though her clothing is aristocratic, Mrs. Miller's pose and gaze are those of a straightforward, working-class woman. The subtle juxtaposition is masterfully captured in the finest of terms.

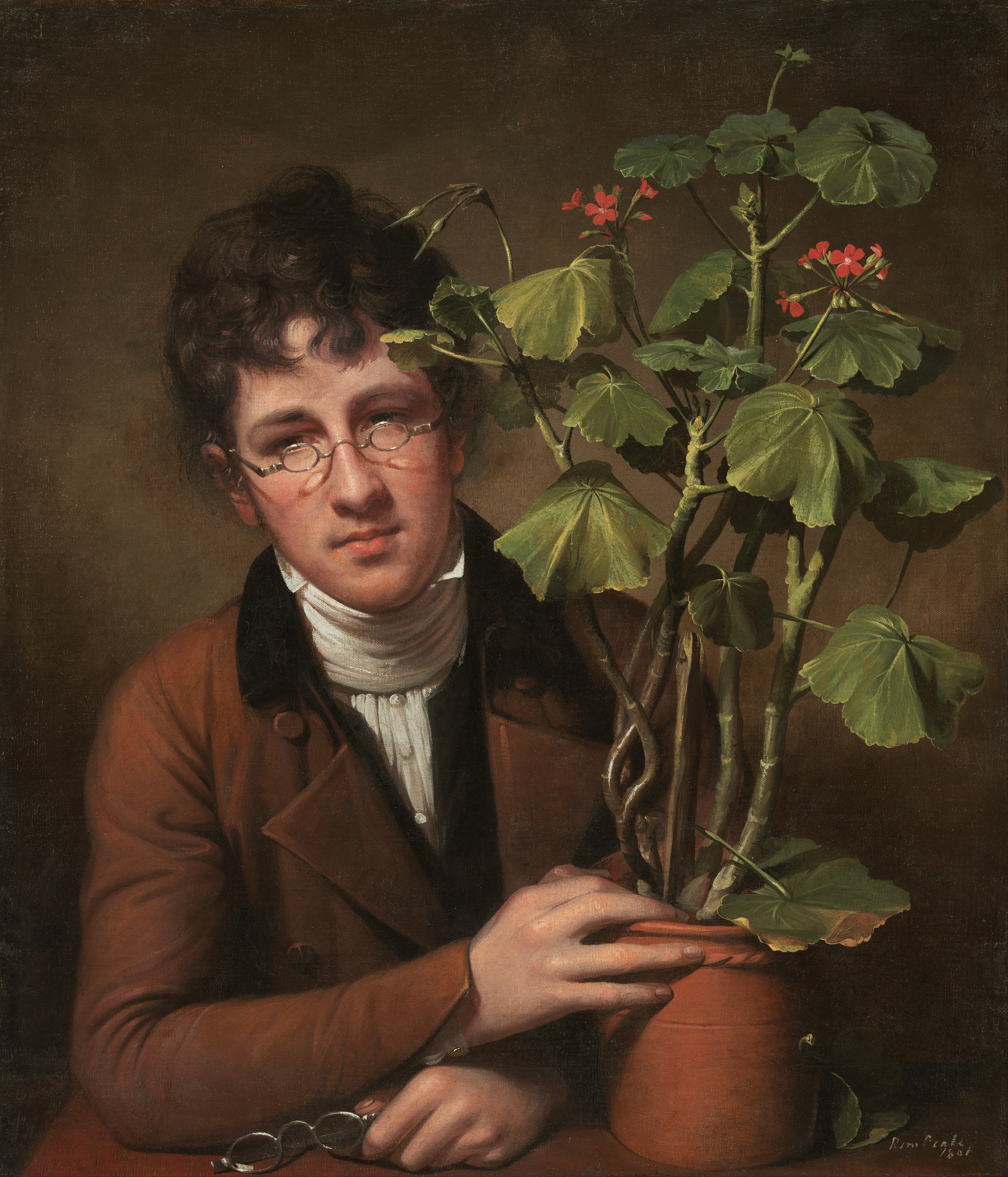
Rembrandt Peale, Rubens Peale with a Geranium (1801)

In 1801, Peale painted a portrait of his brother Rubens, youngest of the six Peale children, who always had an admiration for gardening and tending to natural life. Peale seated his brother next to a geranium. The painting signifies the artist's admiration for a sibling's love of nature, and may have been inspired by the Dutch 17th-century artist, David Teniers the Younger, who had painted a series of oil-on-copper paintings representing the five senses. His painting, Smell is quite similar to Rembrandt Peale's. Rembrandt's piece captures the essence of a young gardener/artist's peace of mind, gracefully looking out, a posture of wonder and calmness.

In 1824, Peale painted the Patriæ Pater, in which a rectangle supporting an oval wreath surrounds the eye-catching image of George Washington. The most successful painting of Peale's 50-year career, it inspired John Marshall to have his portrait done by Peale in the same fashion. The painting was criticized as lacking authenticity, as it was not completed until after Washington's death (1799). Nonetheless, Peale received commendations for his portrait by many noted politicians such as Washington's nephew, Judge Bushrod Washington, who was an associate U.S. Supreme Court Justice, and Marshall.

Peale's neoclassical painting The Roman Daughter demonstrates compassion and graceful defense; his copy of Correggio's Angel, and his immense allegorical painting, Court of Death (1820), reveal the same artistic style.

== Personal life ==
At the age of 20, Peale married 22-year-old Eleanor May Short (1776–1836) at St. Joseph's Catholic Church in Philadelphia. During their marriage, Peale and Short had nine children: Rosalba, Eleanor, Michael Angelo, Angelica, and Emma Clara among them. In 1840, he married Harriet Cany (1799–1869), one of his pupils and an artist in her own right.

== Legacy ==
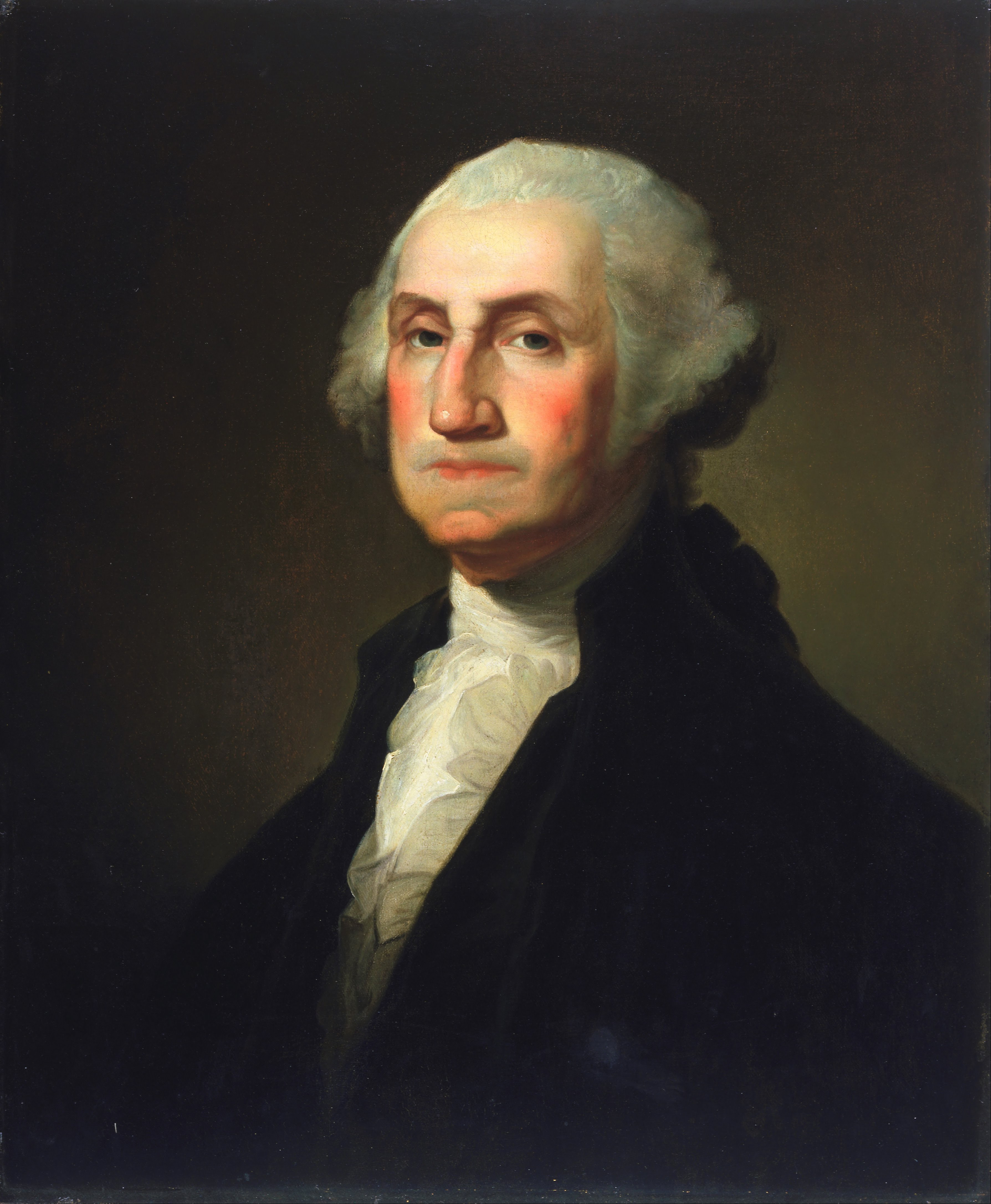
Portrait of George Washington (1795–1823)

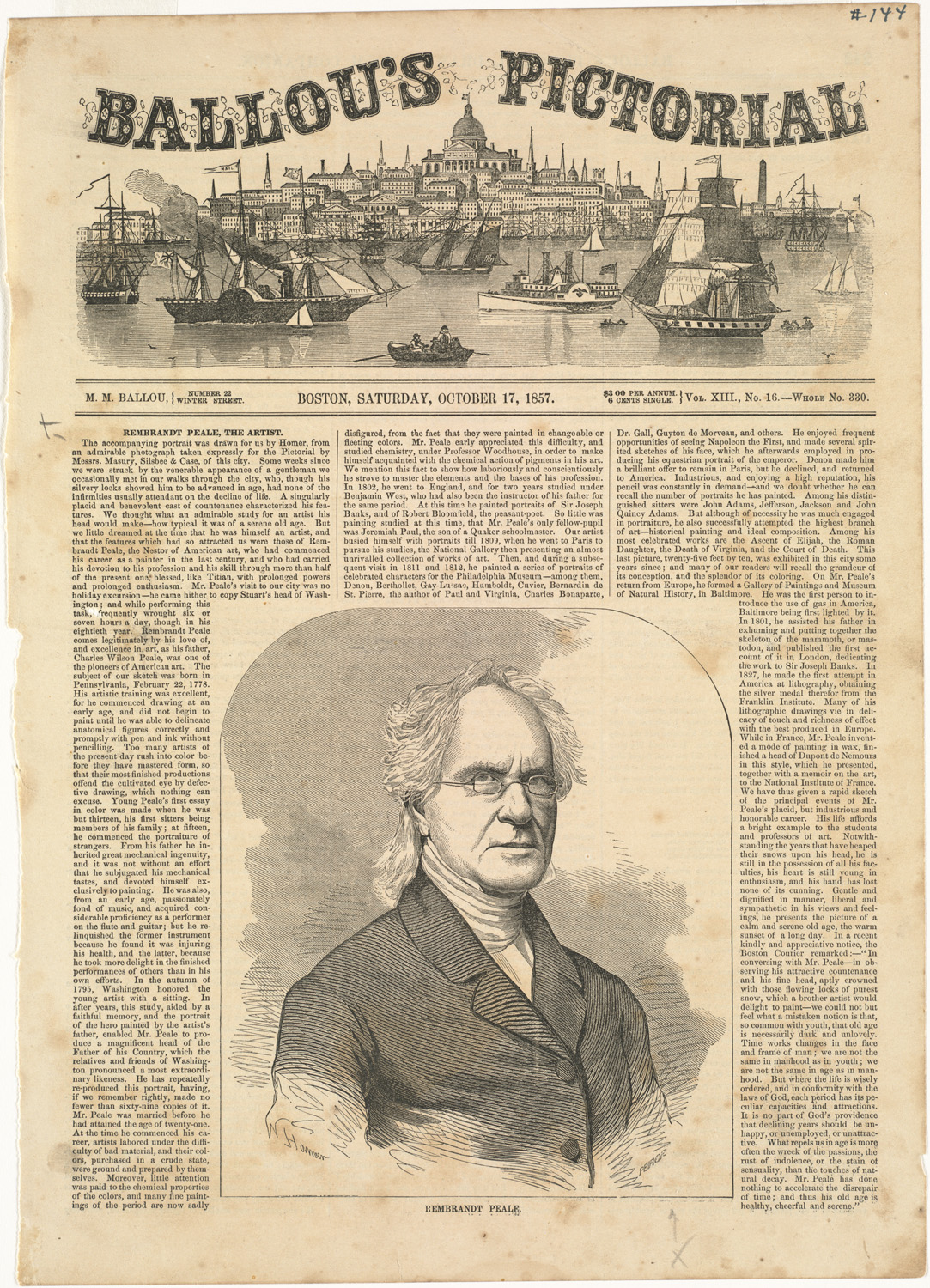
Ballou's Pictorial, Volume XIII, October 17, 1857

Rembrandt Peale completed more than 600 paintings. He painted portraits of many notable people, including American presidents George Washington and Thomas Jefferson, Chief Justice John Marshall, and John C. Calhoun. His paintings are in many public collections.

== Collections ==
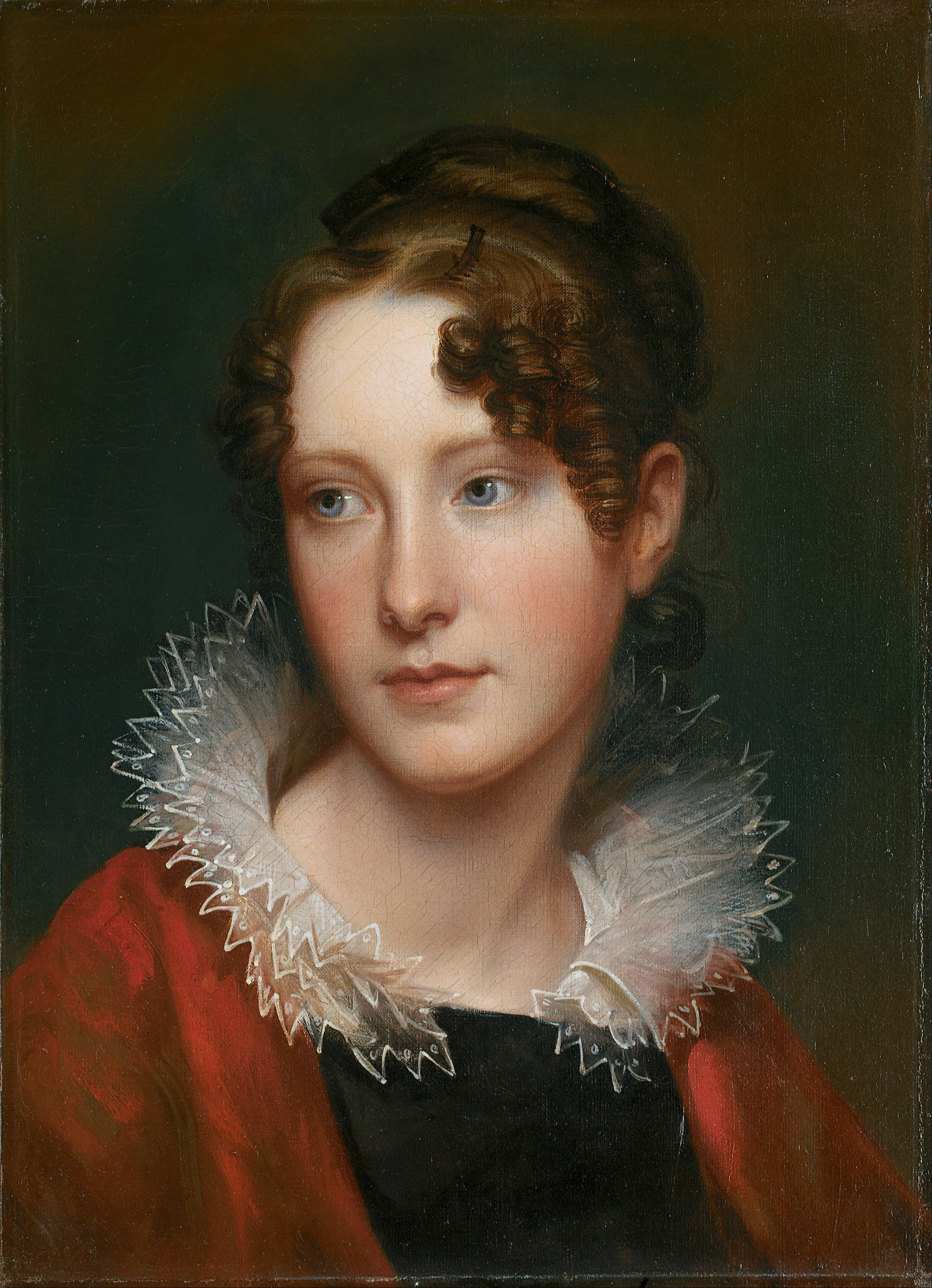
Portrait of Rosalba Peale (1820), Smithsonian American Art Museum

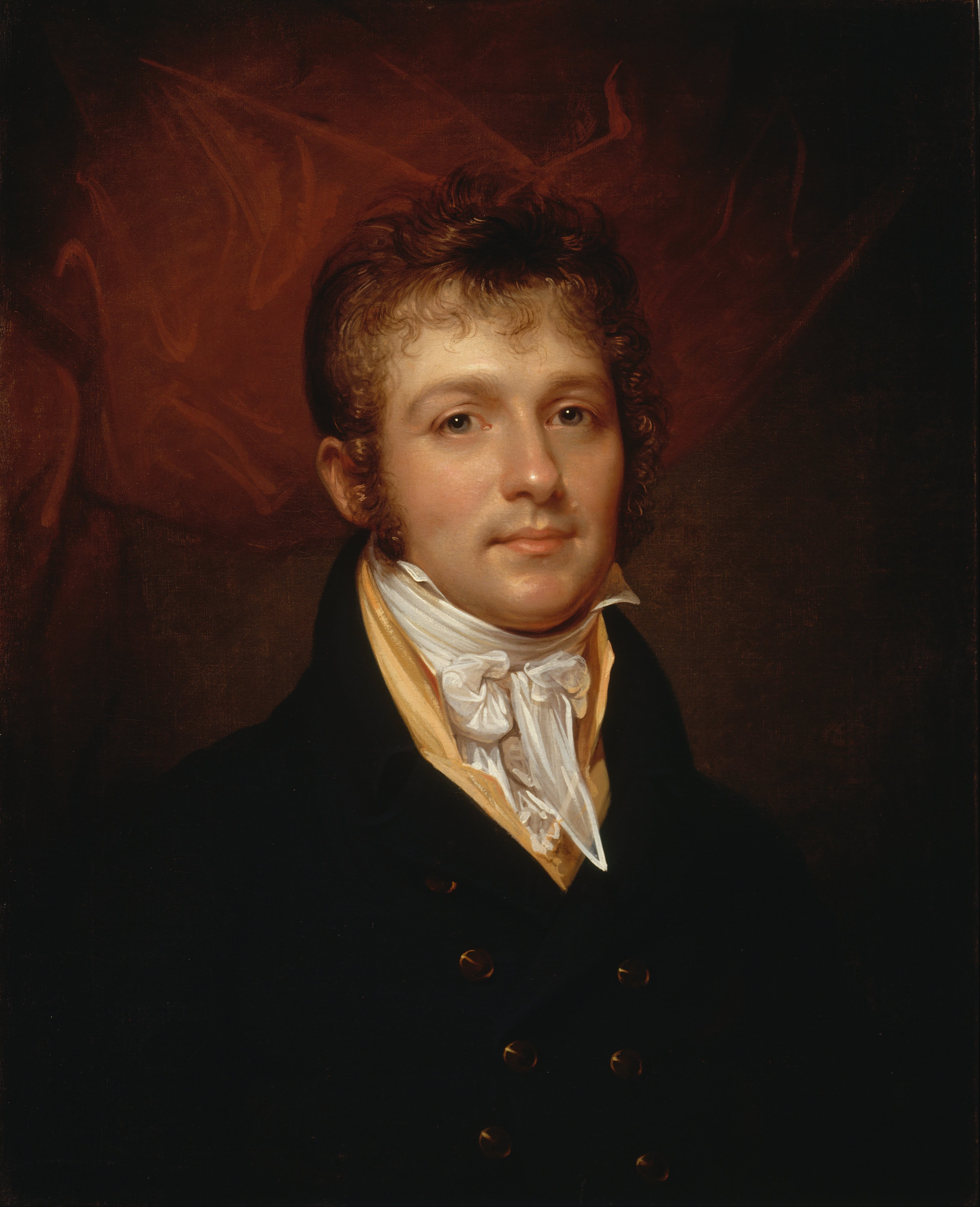
Portrait of Edward Shippen Burd of Philadelphia (c. 1806–1808)

The following is a partial list of collections holding works by Rembrandt Peale:

- Washington, D.C.: National Museum of American Art and National Portrait Gallery, The Smithsonian Institution
- Baltimore, Maryland: The Peale Museum, Baltimore Museum of Art, Maryland Historical Society, Walters Art Museum
- Philadelphia, Pennsylvania: The Historical Society of Pennsylvania, Atwater Kent Museum, Pennsylvania Academy of Fine Arts
- Detroit, Michigan: Detroit Institute of Arts
- Columbus, Georgia: The Columbus Museum
- Birmingham, Alabama: Birmingham Museum of Art
- New York: Brooklyn Museum, The Peale Museum of New York
- New London, Connecticut: Lyman Allyn Art Museum
- Dallas, Texas: The Dallas Museum of Art Modern American Collection
- Pittsfield, Massachusetts: Berkshire Museum
- Philadelphia, Pennsylvania: La Salle University Art Museum
- Williamsburg, Virginia: Muscarelle Museum of Art at William & Mary
- Wilmington, Delaware: Hagley Museum and Library and Winterthur Museum, Garden and Library
- Saint Louis, Missouri: Saint Louis Art Museum

== Other notable paintings ==
- Charles Willson Peale, Historical Society of Pennsylvania, Philadelphia, 1812
- Washington Before Yorktown, Corcoran Gallery of Art, 1824
- John C. Calhoun, Gibbes Museum of Art, 1834
- The Sisters, Eleanor and Rosalba Peale, A. Augustus Healy Fund, Brooklyn Museum, 1826
- General Thomas Sumter, Independence National Historical Park, Philadelphia, 1796
- Mrs. Marbury, Private Collection, 1797
- Sculpture, Atwater Kent Museum, Philadelphia, c. 1812
- DeWitt Clinton, Historical Society of Pennsylvania, Philadelphia, 1823
- Mary Jane Peale, Elise Peale Patterson de Golpi-Toro, New York, 1835
- Eleanor May Short Peale, Private Collection, 1836
- William Henry Harrison, Grouseland (William Henry Harrison House), Vincennes, IN

== A portrait identified ==
A painting of a comedian who was an acquaintance of the British painter George Clint—an artist whose style resembled Peale's, and who claimed the picture as his own—was examined by the National Portrait Gallery of London in 1914. It was initially confirmed as Clint's artwork. Later, the gallery further examined the history behind the painting: the English comedian, Charles Mathews, had arrived in New York in 1822, and left shortly after Peale had welcomed him for a portrait painting.

== Gallery ==
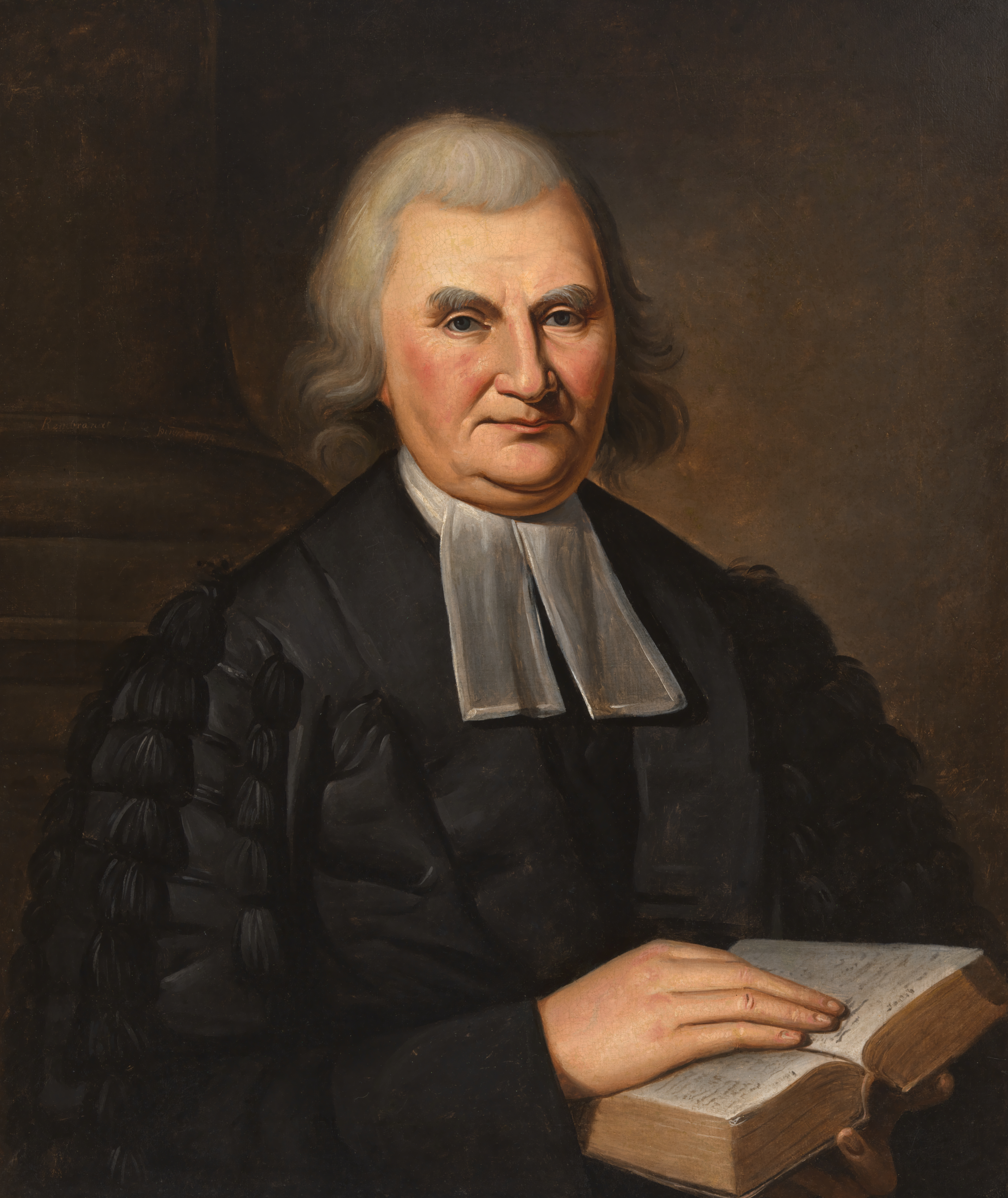
Portrait of John Witherspoon, c. 1794

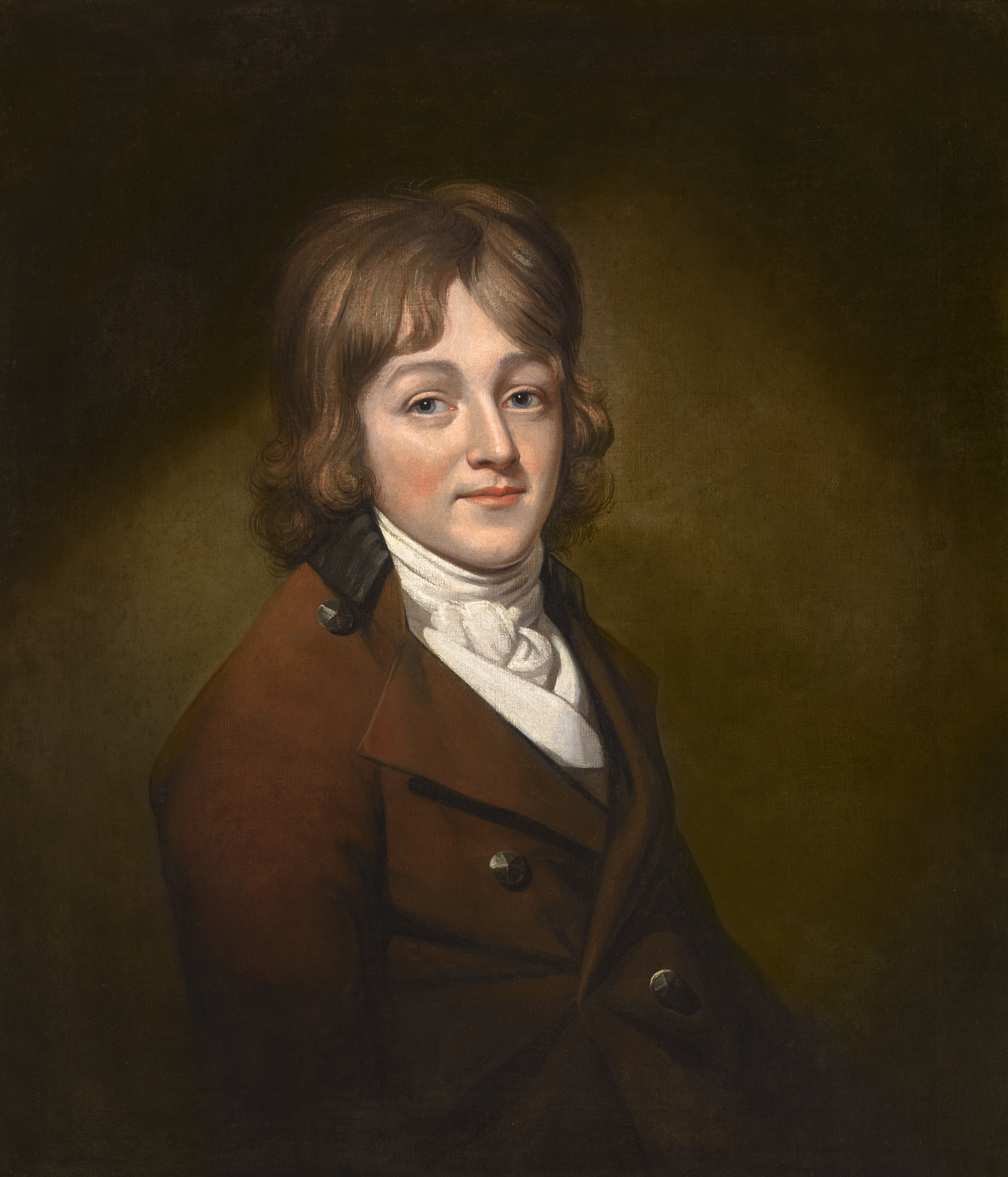
Portrait of Francis Scott Key, c. 1796

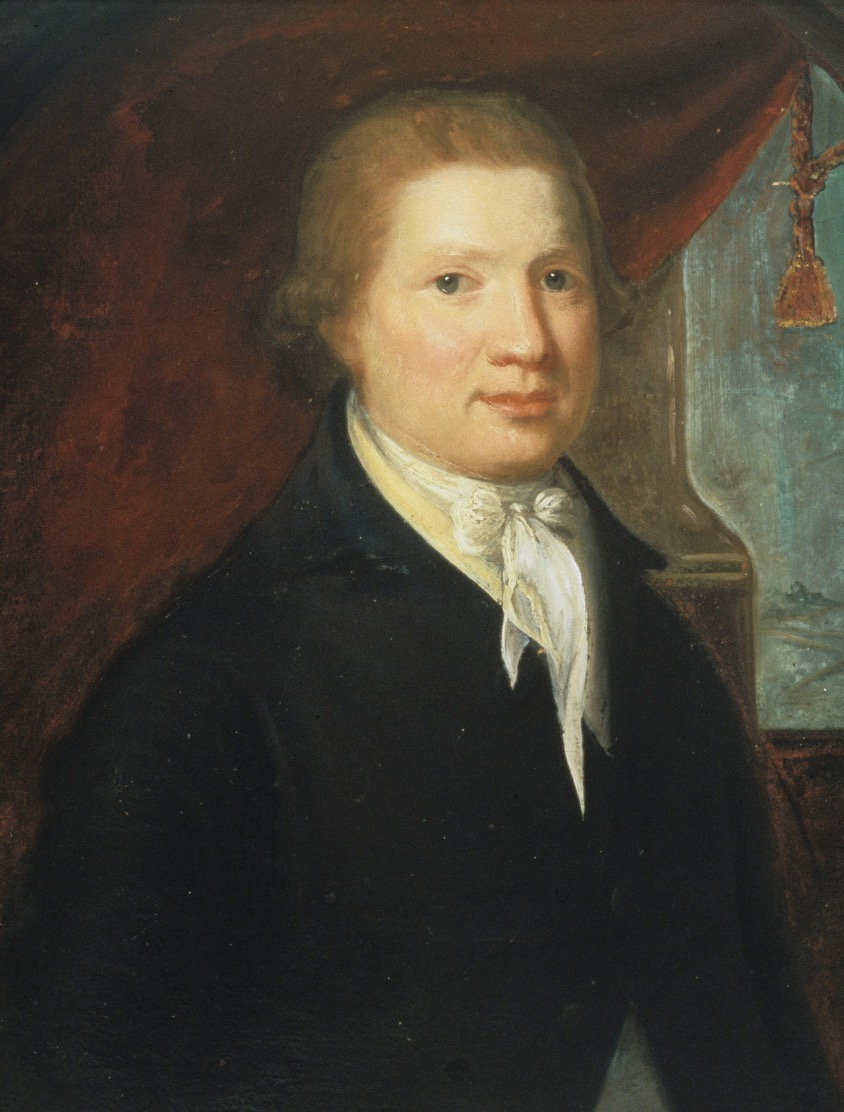
Portrait of Joseph McMinn, c. 1796

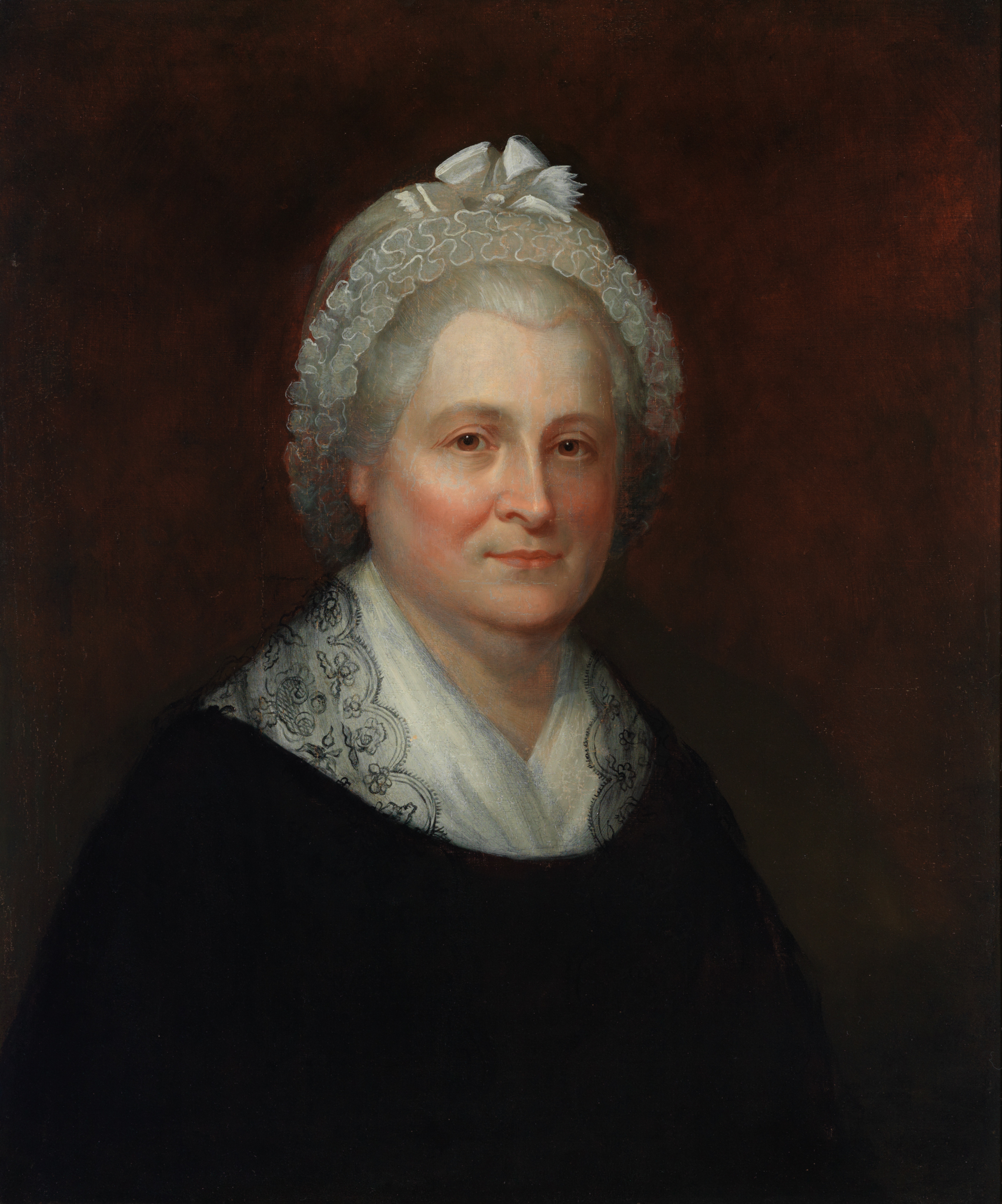
Portrait of Martha Washington, c. 1796

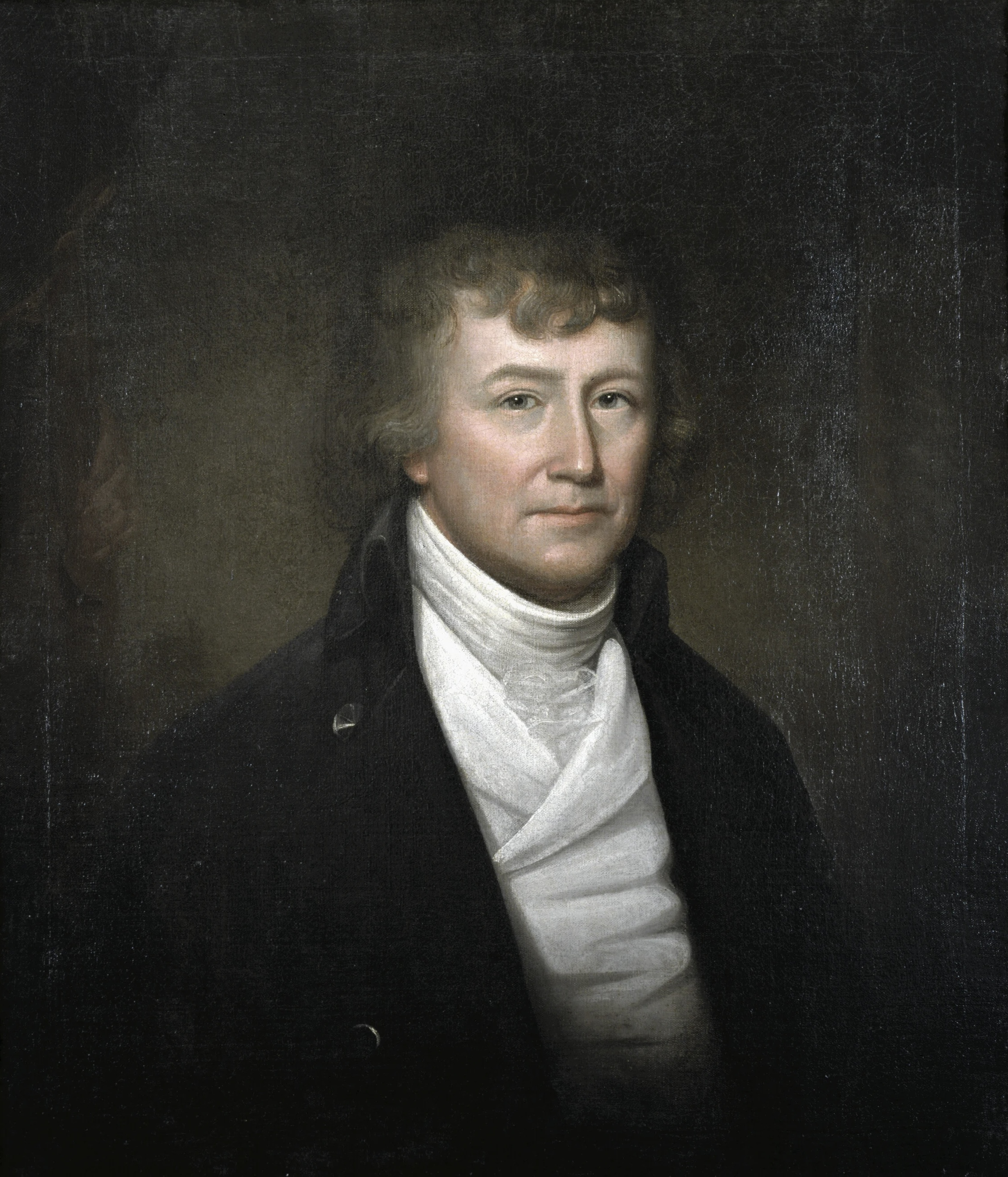
Portrait of Alexander Contee Hanson Sr., c. 1798

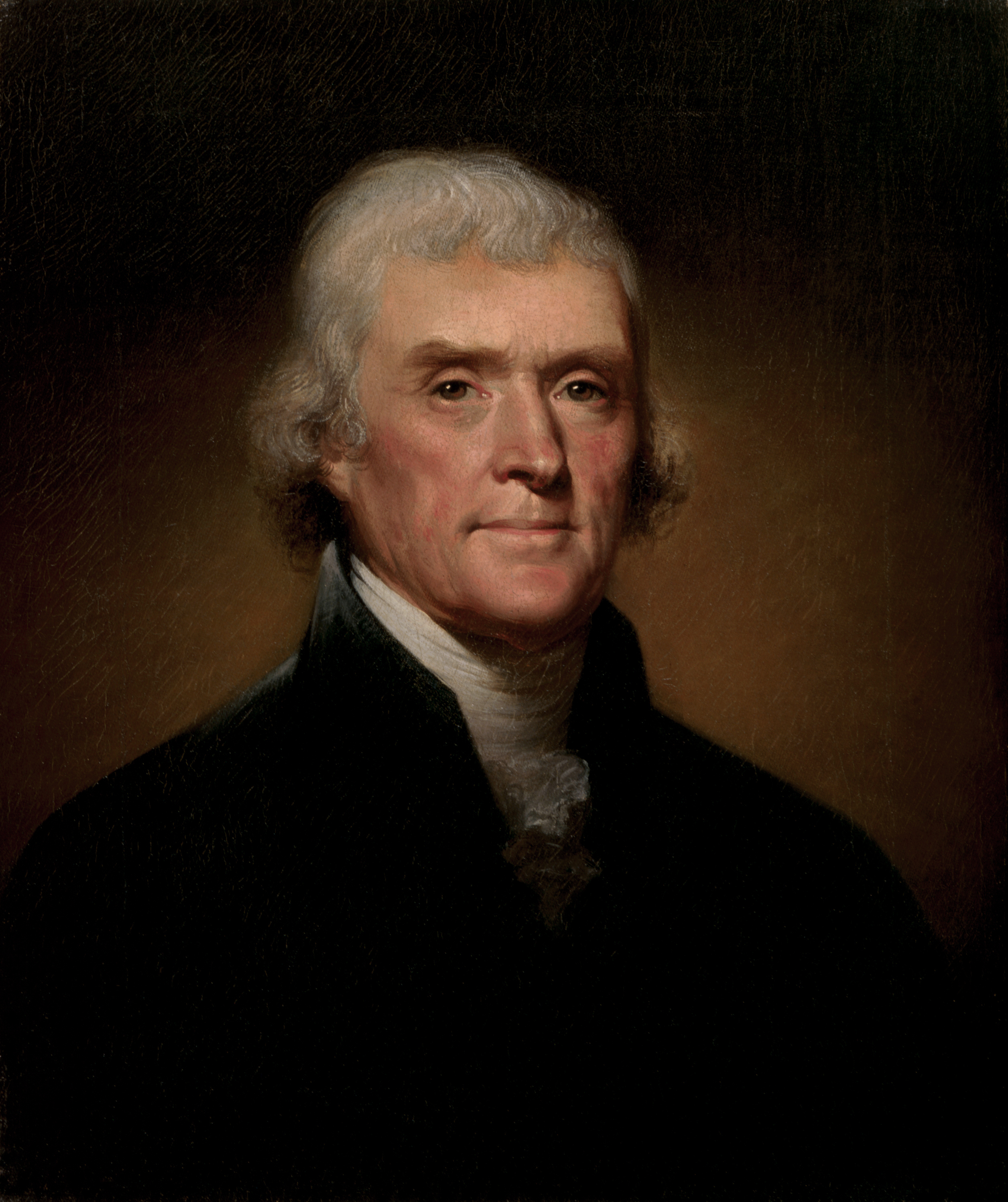
Portrait of Thomas Jefferson, c. 1800

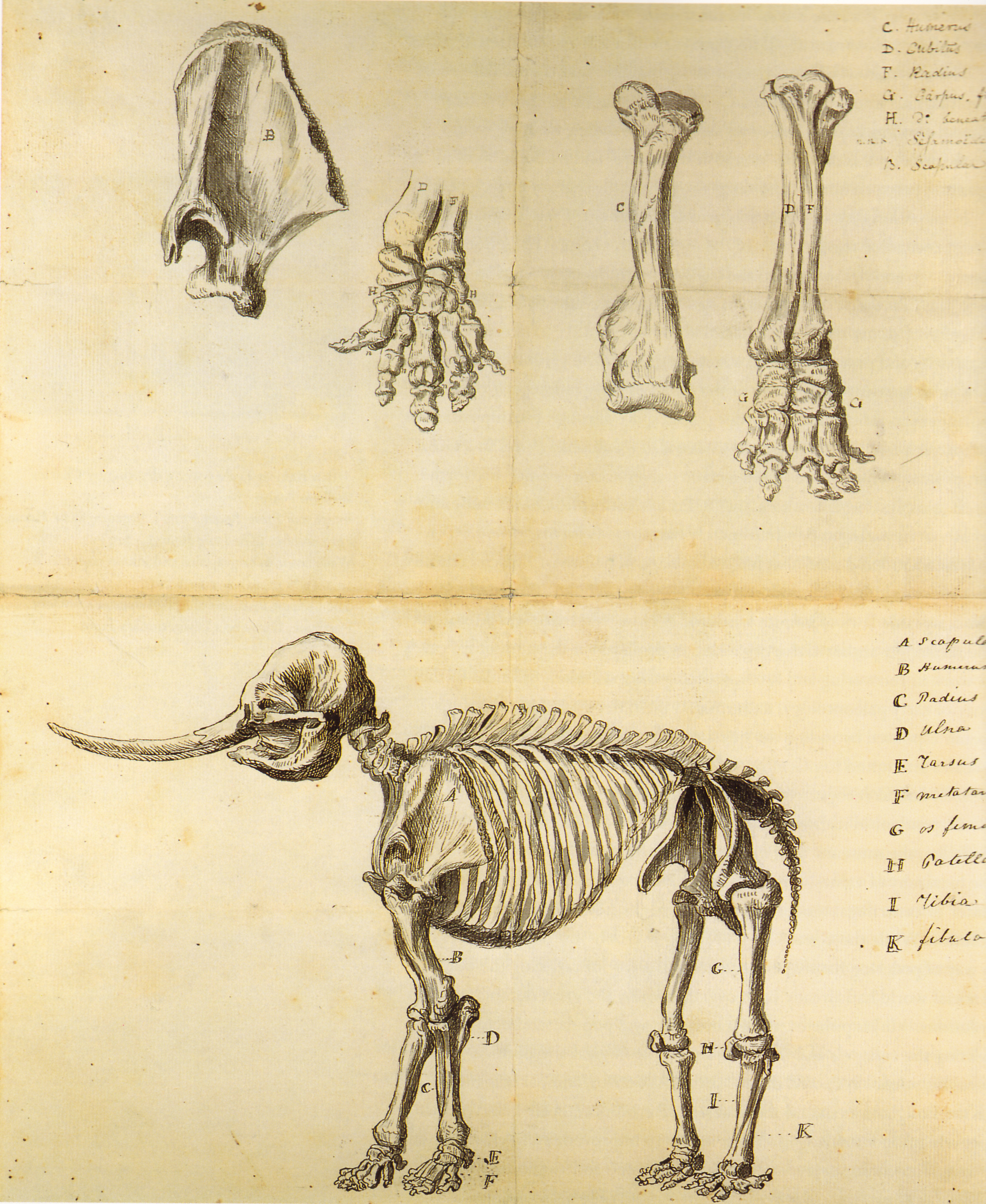
Working Sketch of the Mastodon, c. 1801

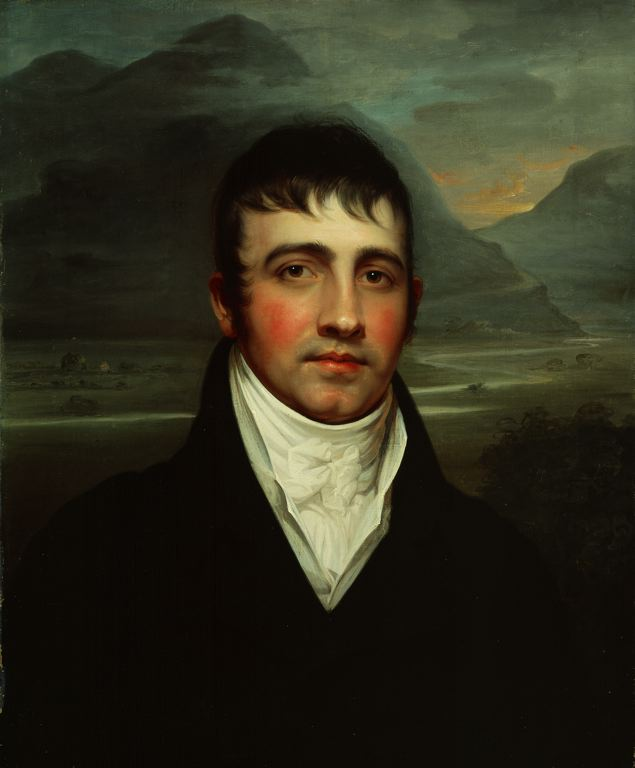
Portrait of Samuel Fisher Bradford, c. 1803–1808

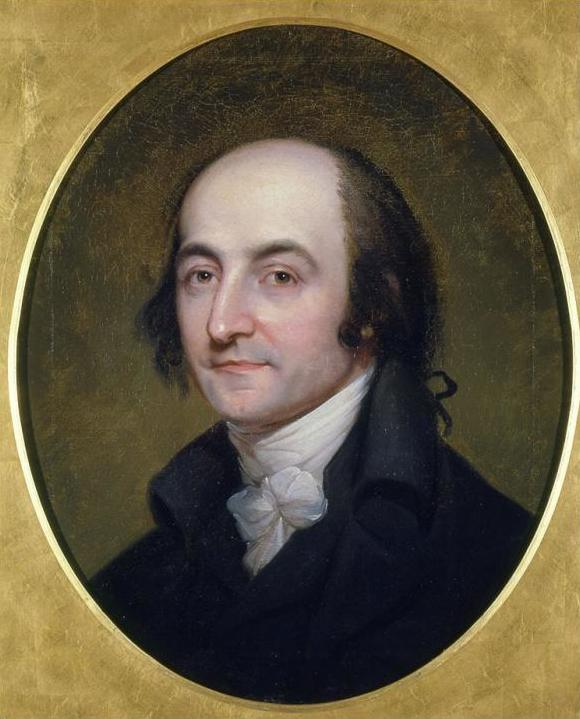
Portrait of Albert Gallatin, c. 1805

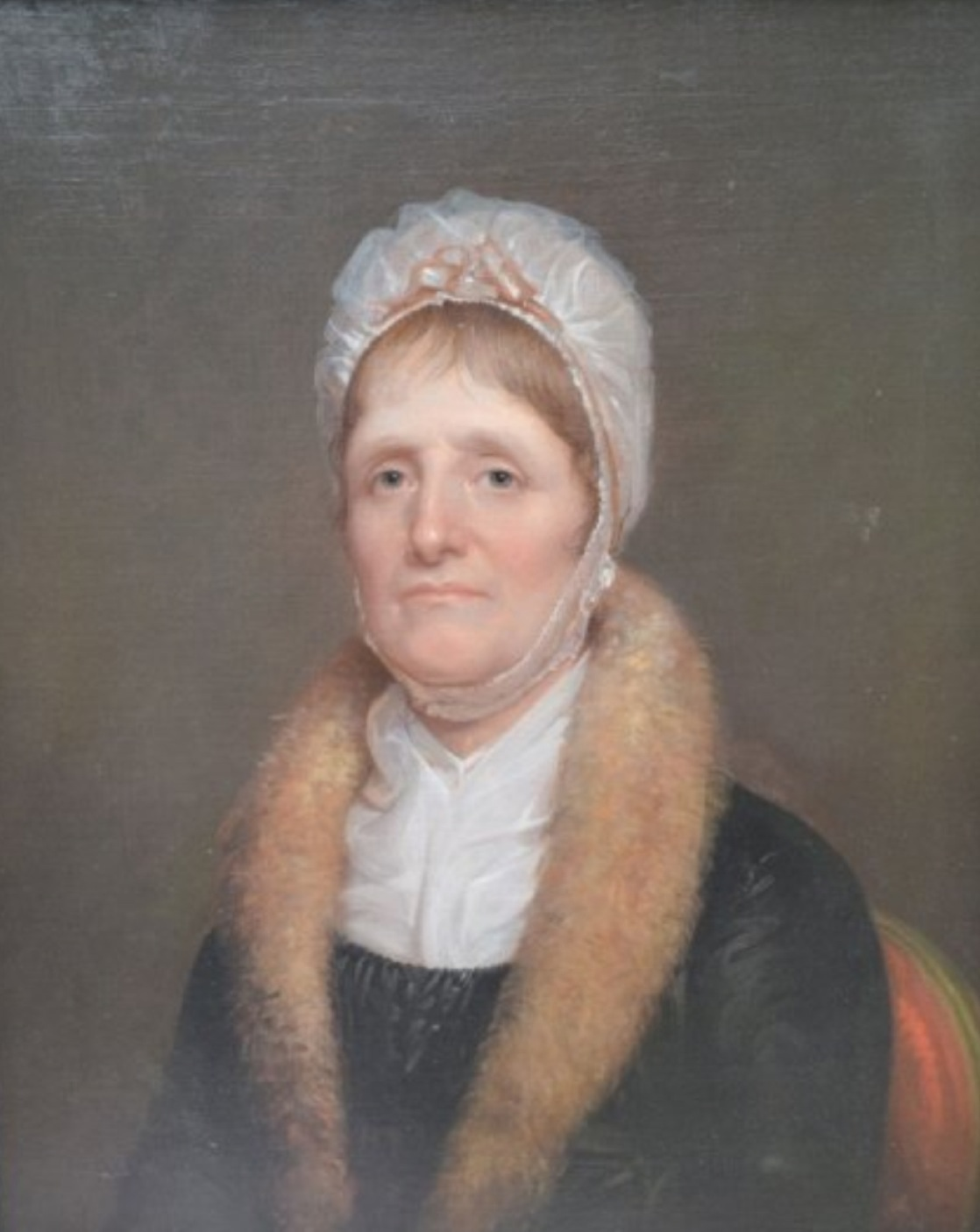
Portrait of Margaret Irvine Miller, c. 1805

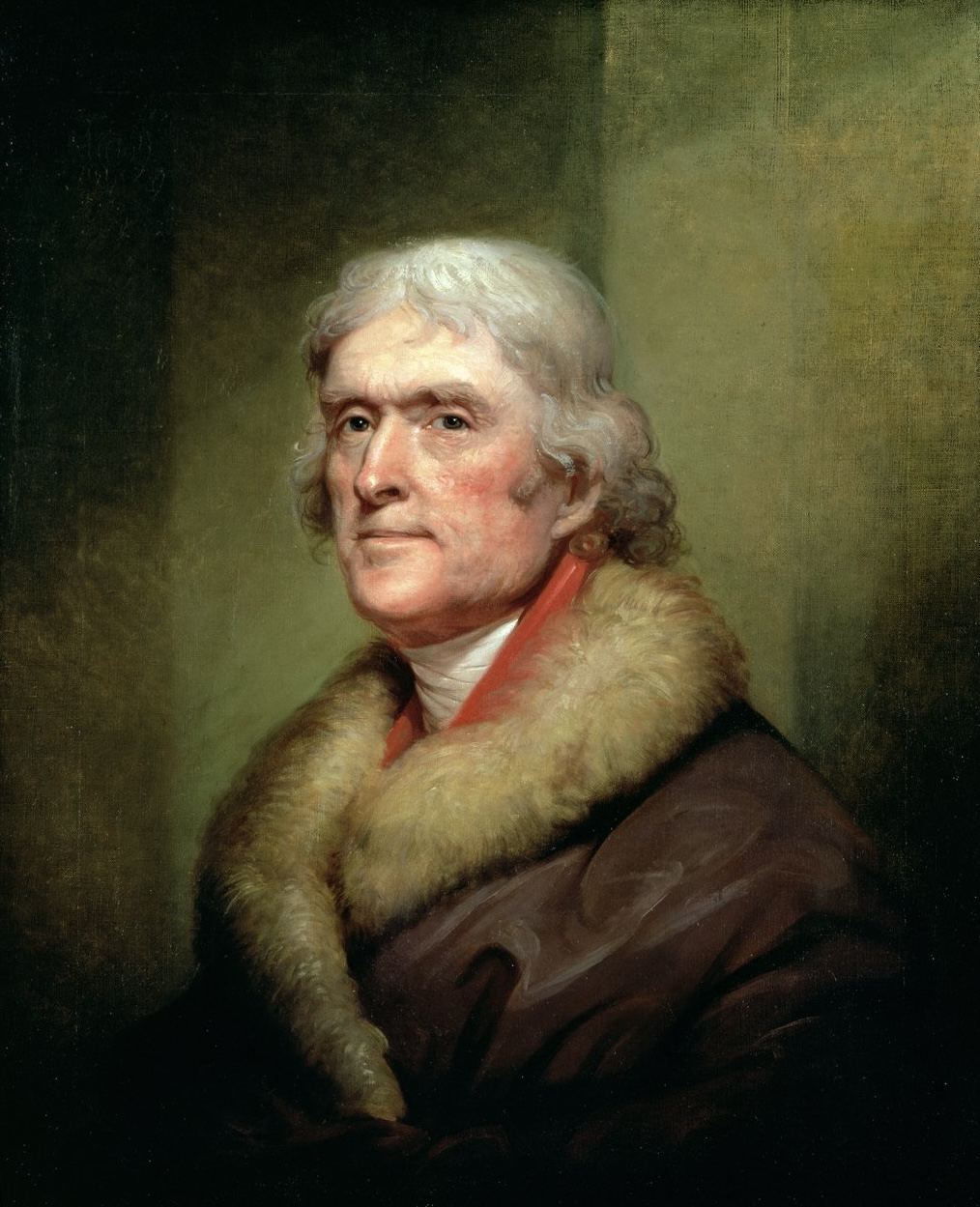
Portrait of Thomas Jefferson, c. 1805

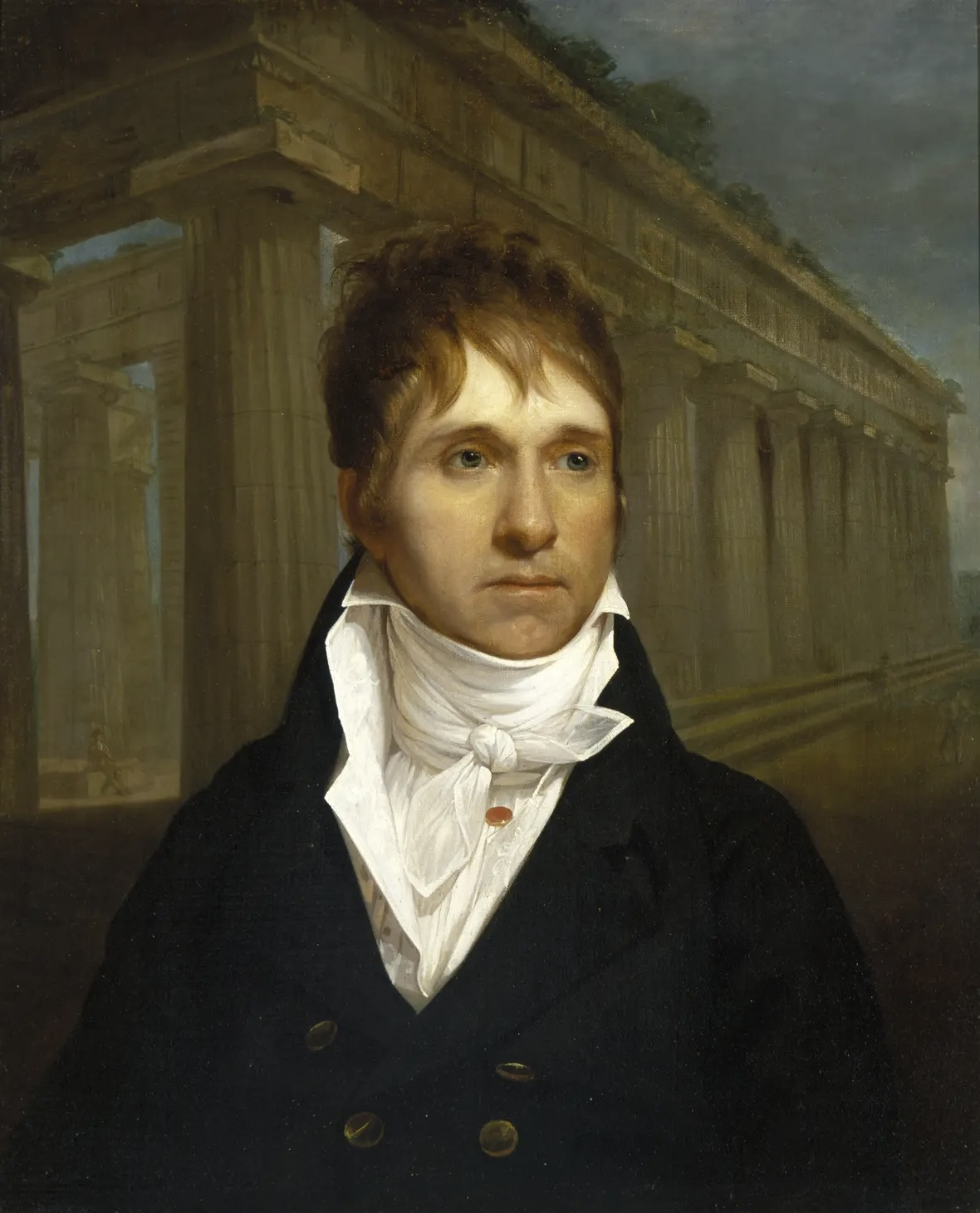
Portrait of William Short, c. 1806

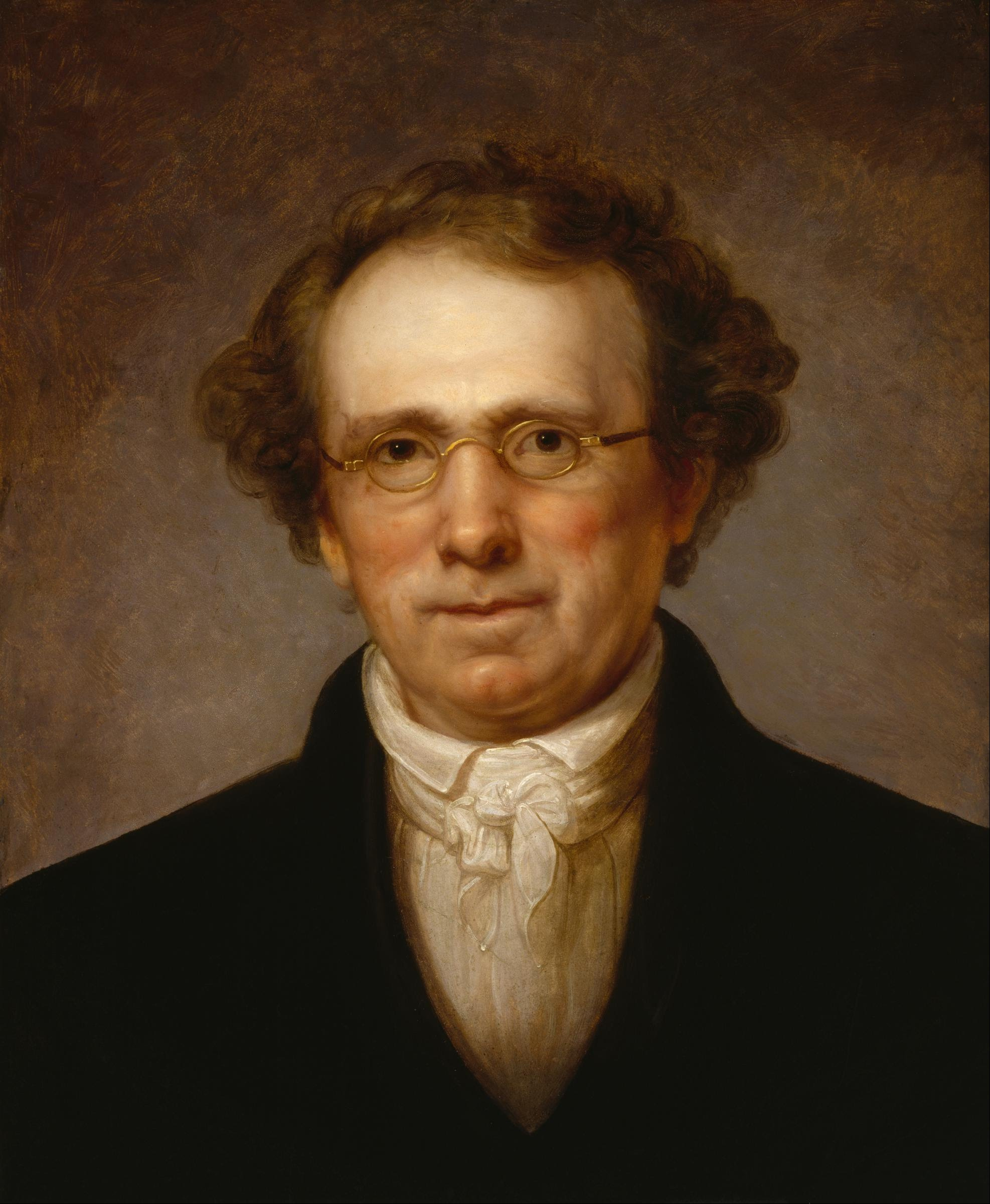
Portrait of Henry Robinson, c. 1806–1808

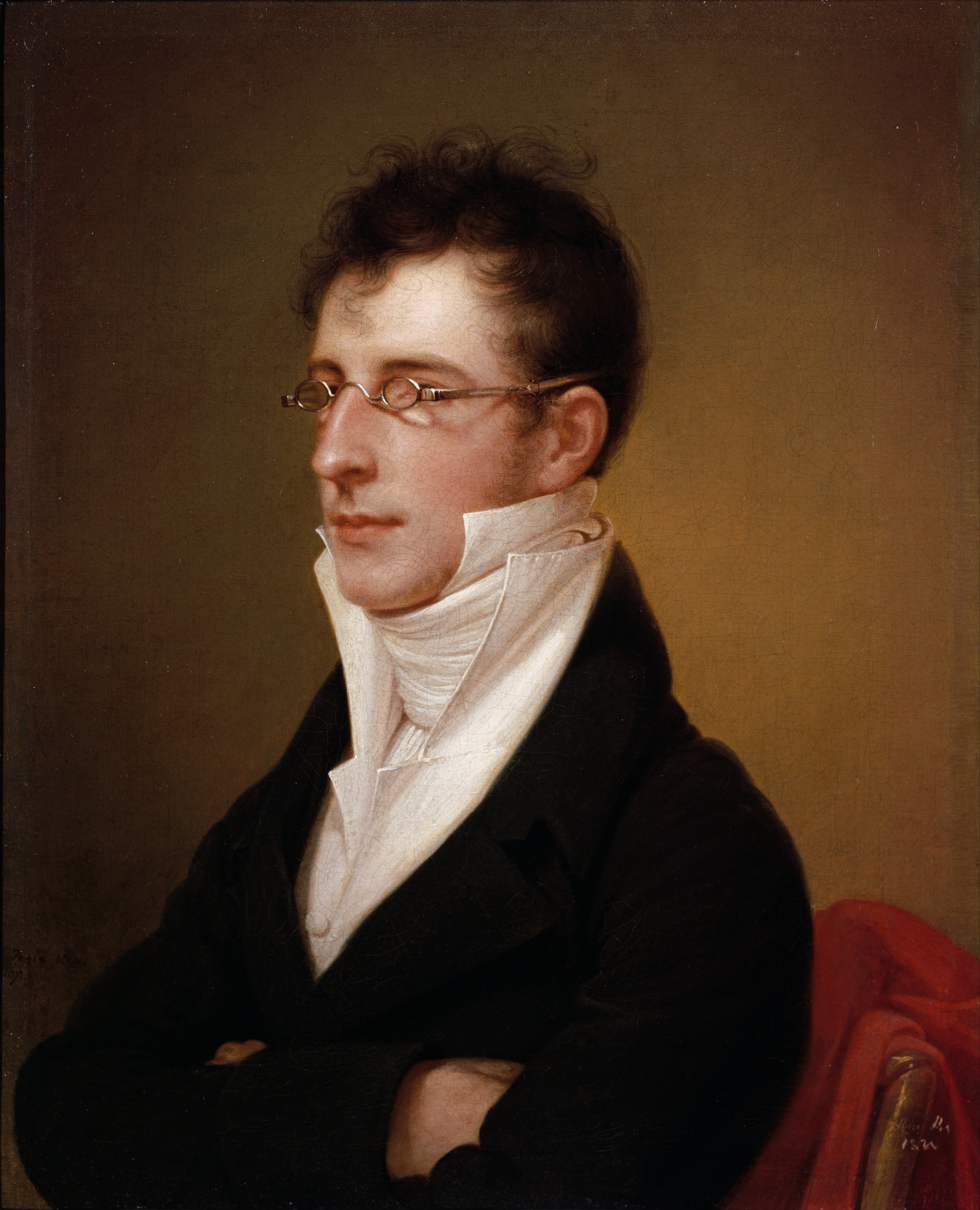
Portrait of Rubens Peale, c. 1807

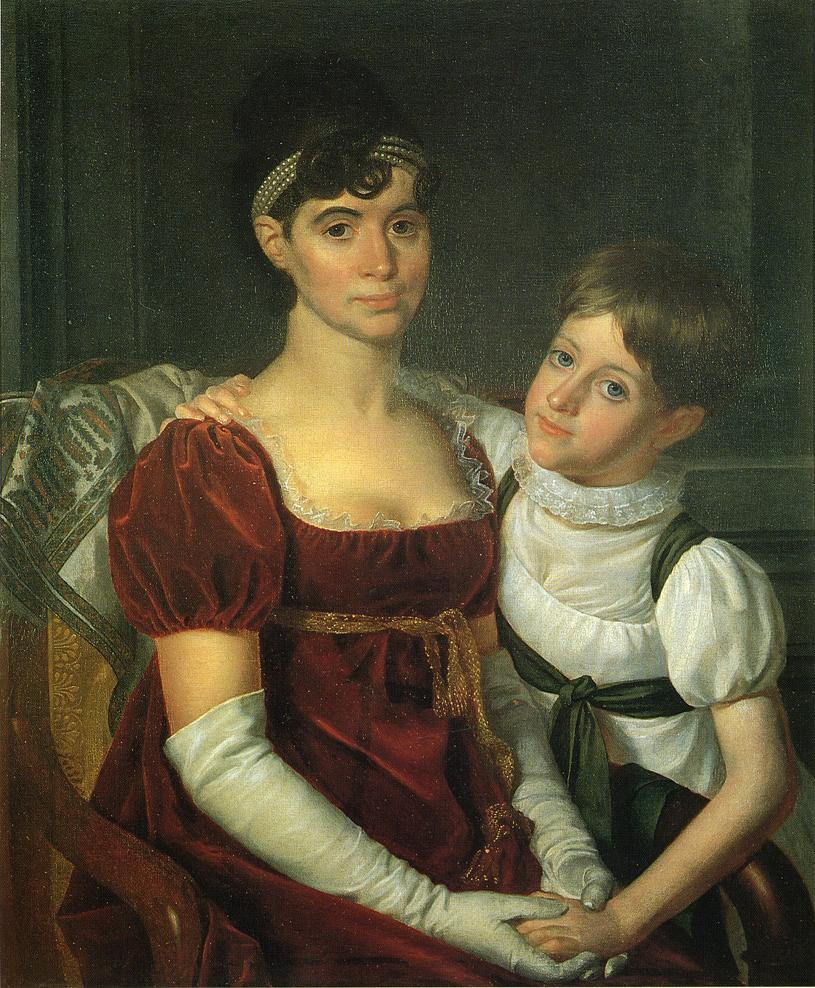
Portrait of Alida Livingston Armstrong and Daughter, c. 1810

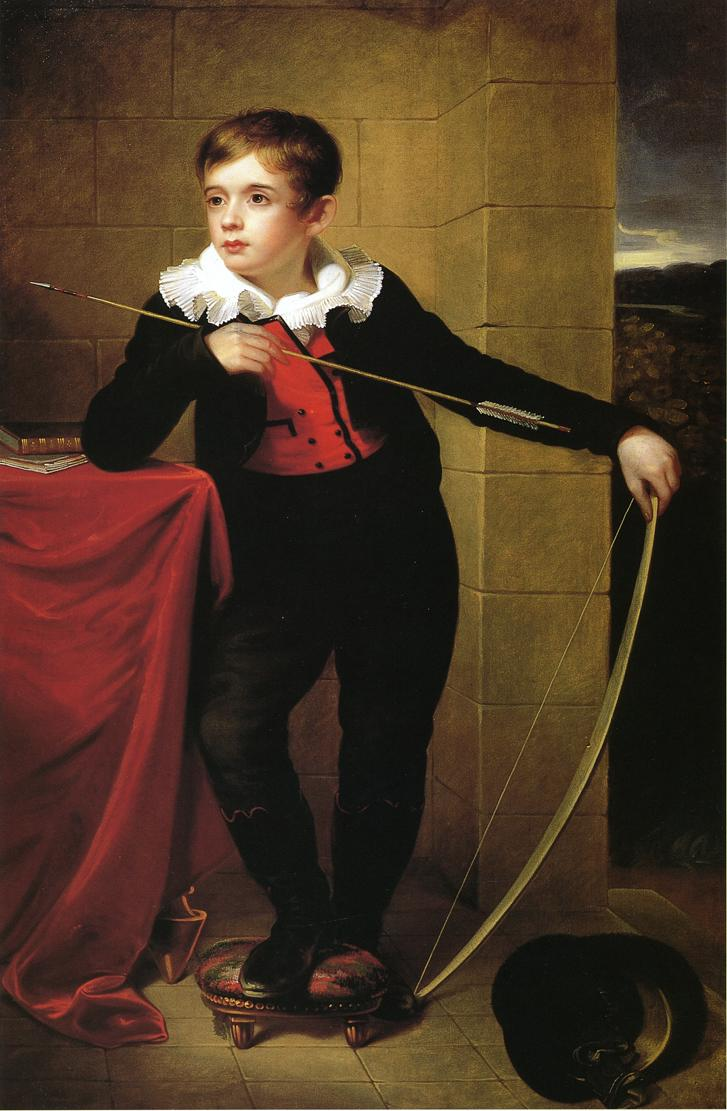
Portrait of a boy from the Taylor Family, c. 1812

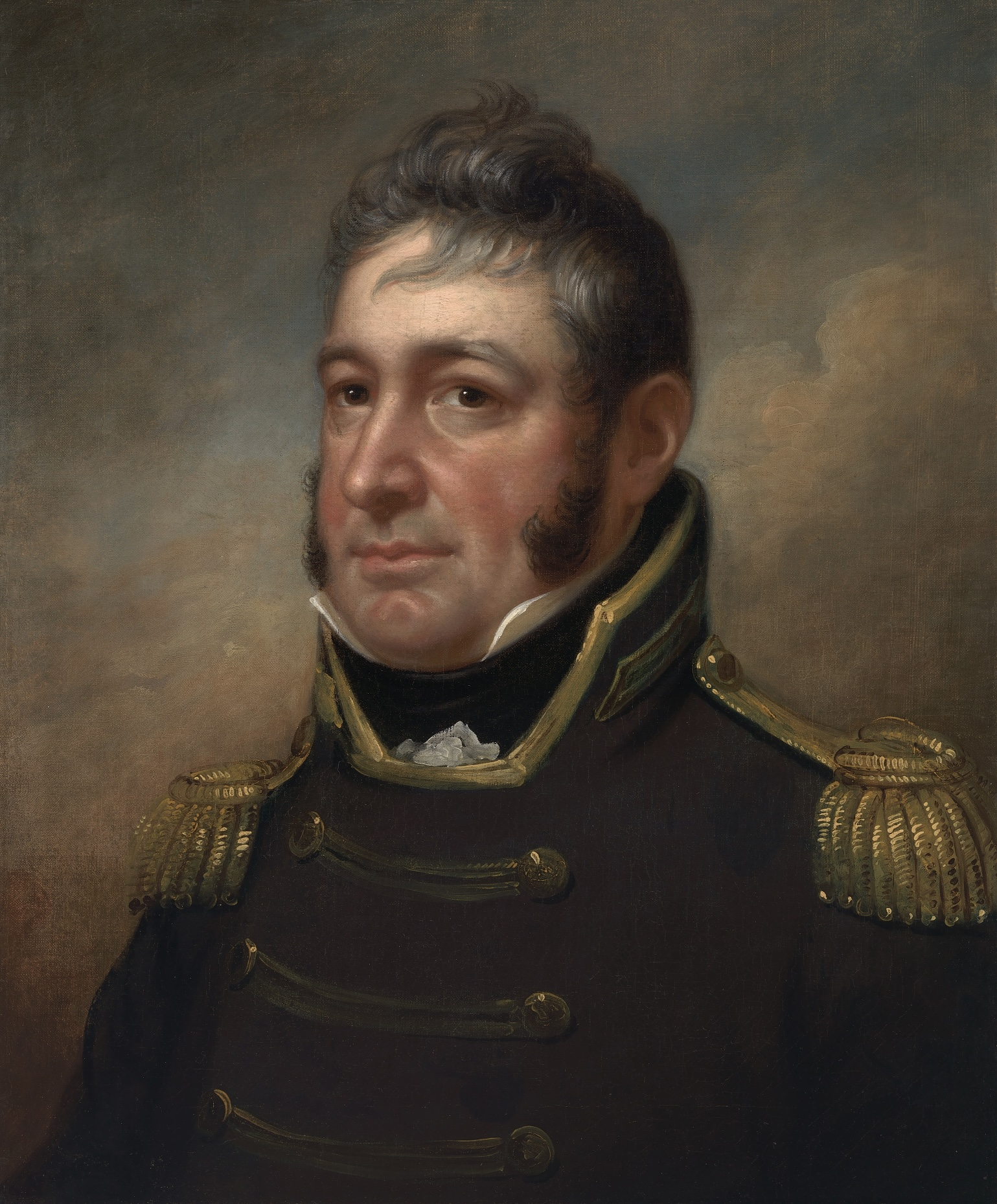
Portrait of William Bainbridge, c. 1814

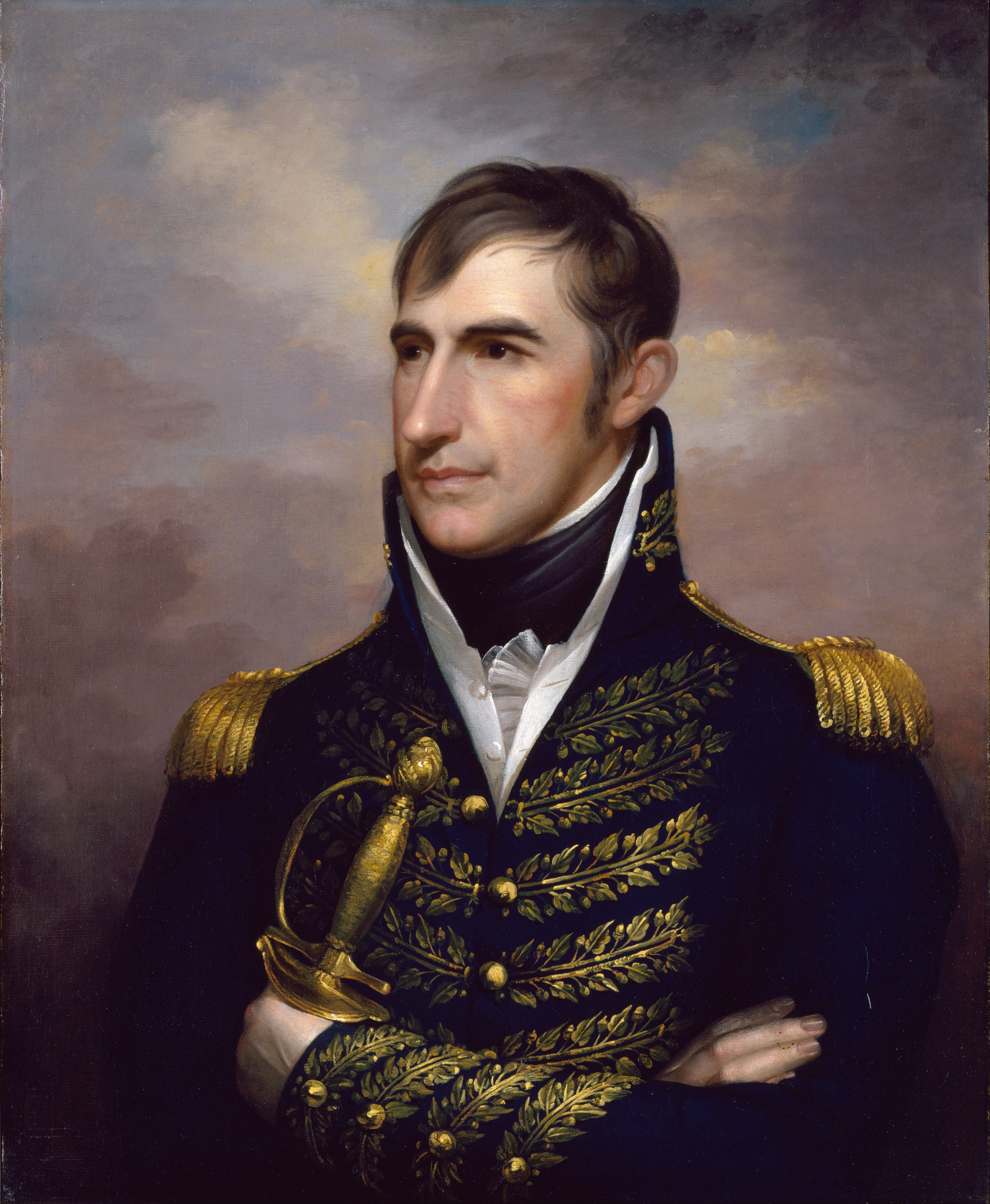
Portrait of William Henry Harrison, c. 1814

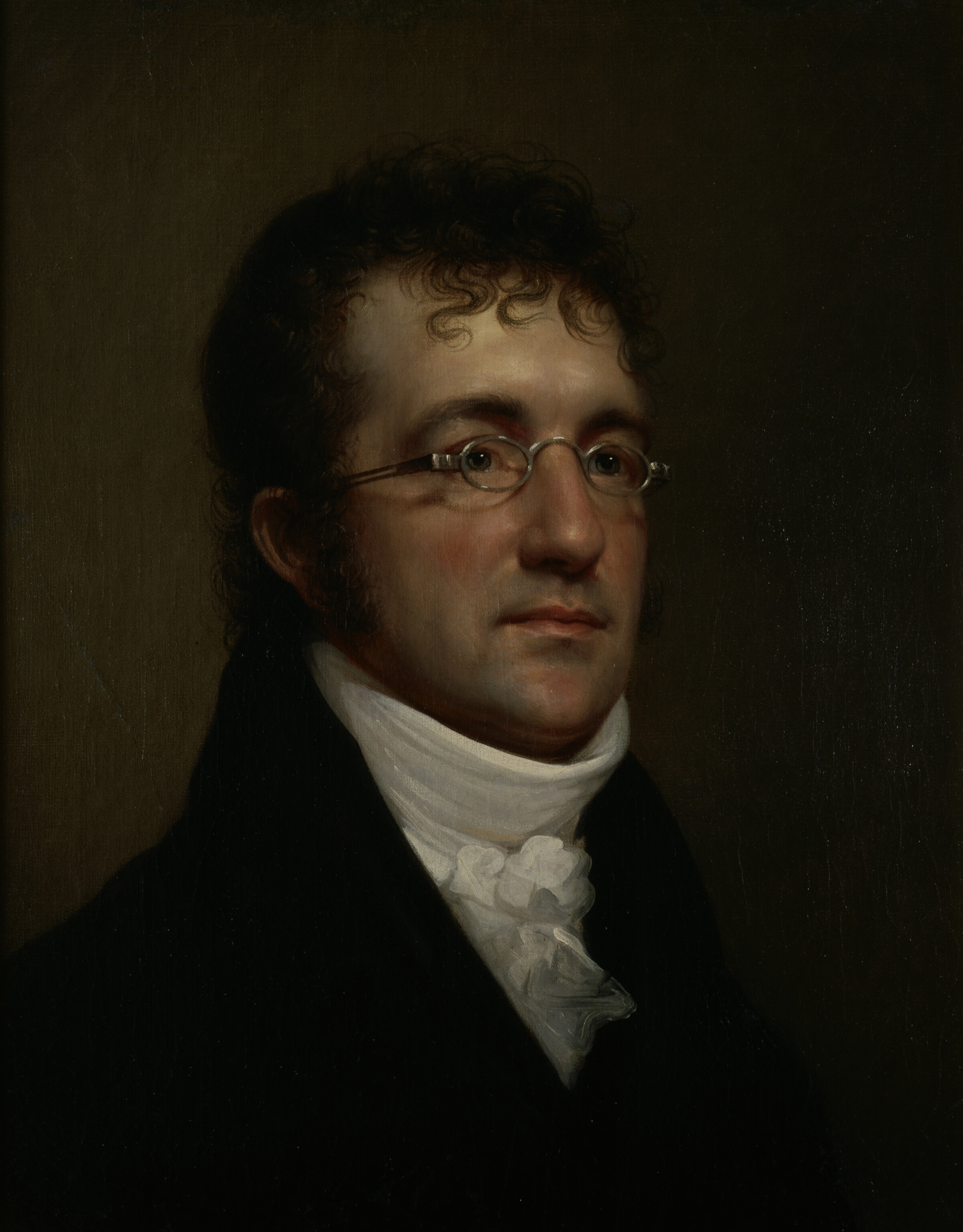
Portrait of Benjamin Henry Latrobe, c. 1815

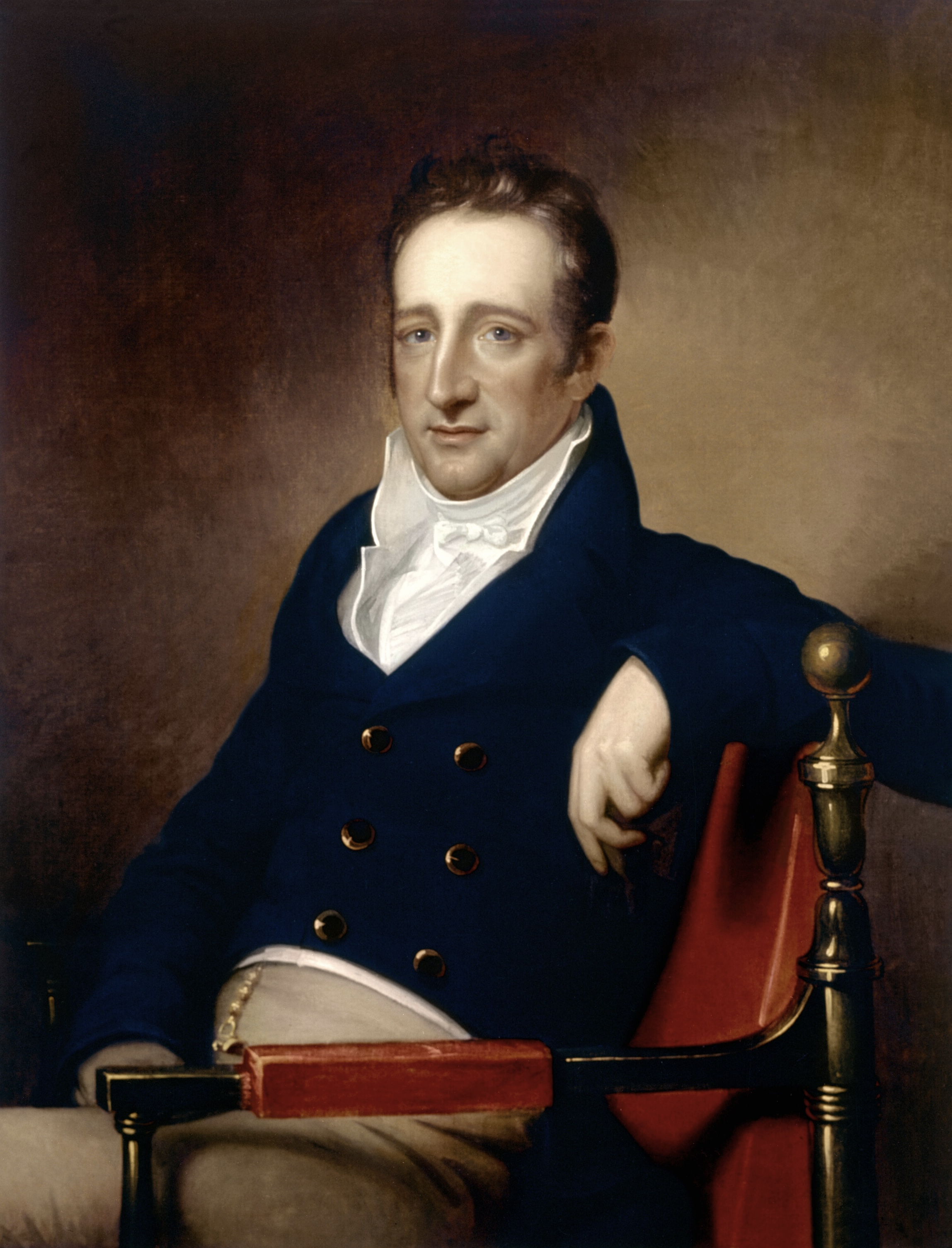
Portrait of Issac McKim, c. 1815

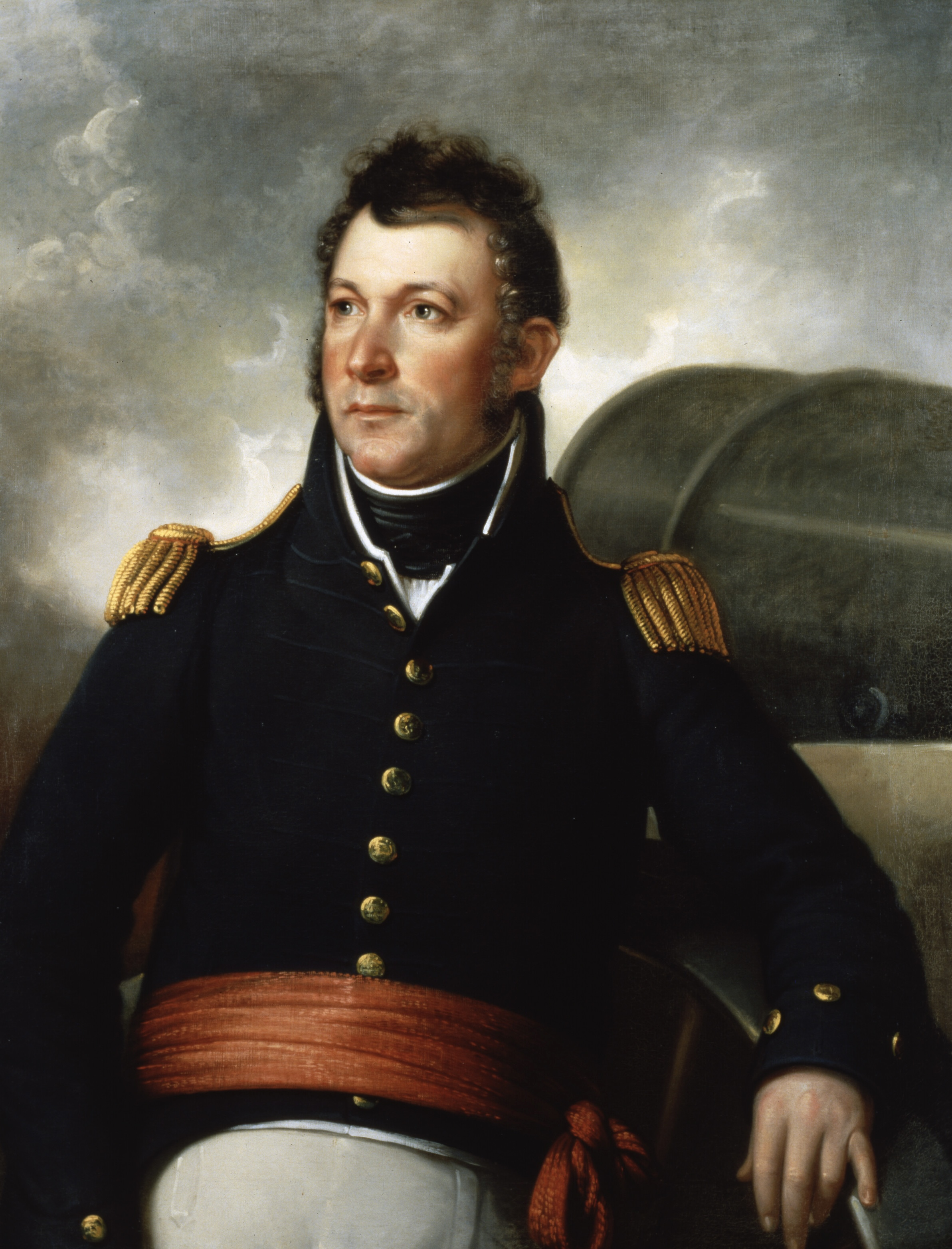
Portrait of George Armistead, c. 1817

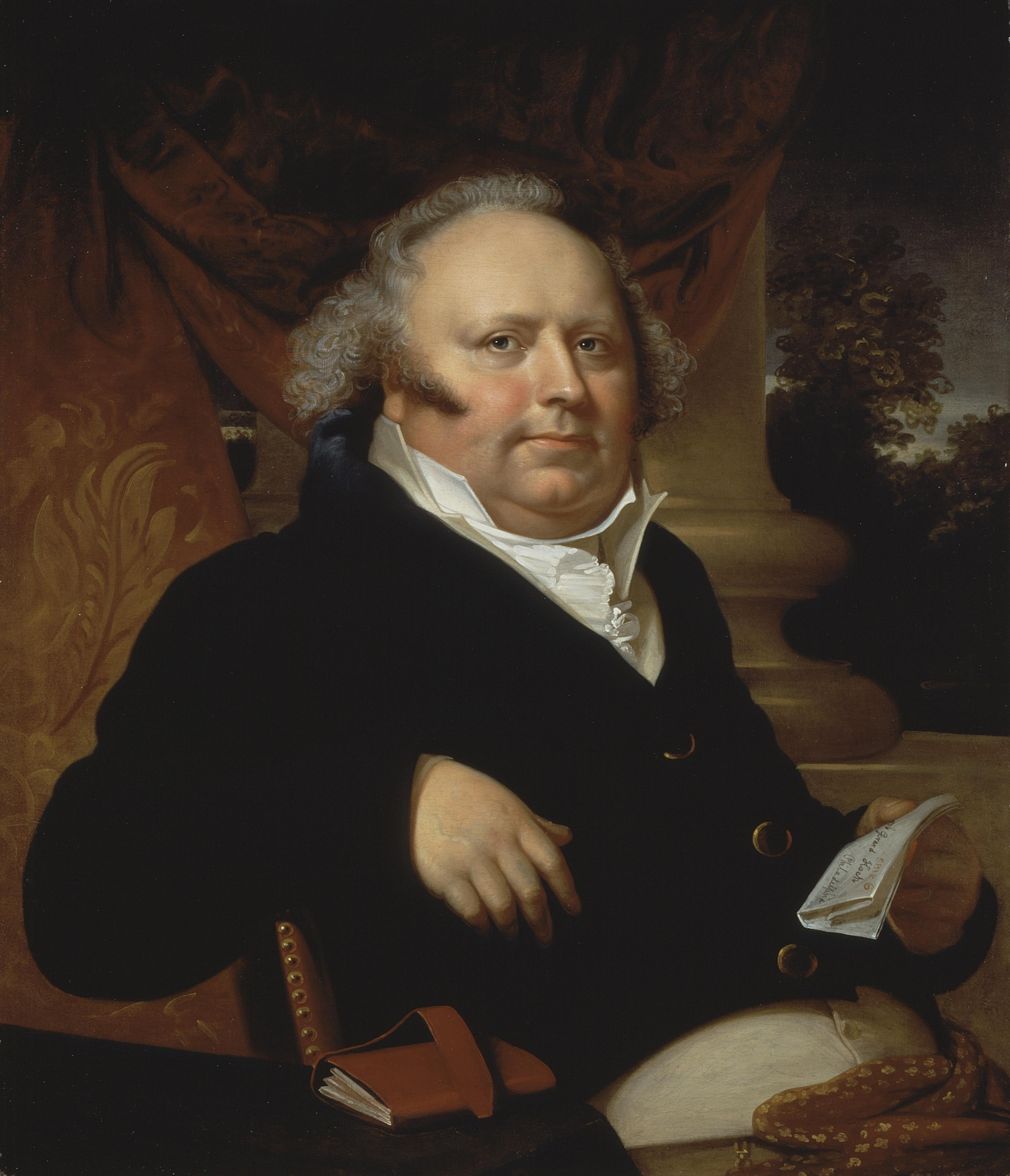
Portrait of Jacob Gerard Koch, c. 1817

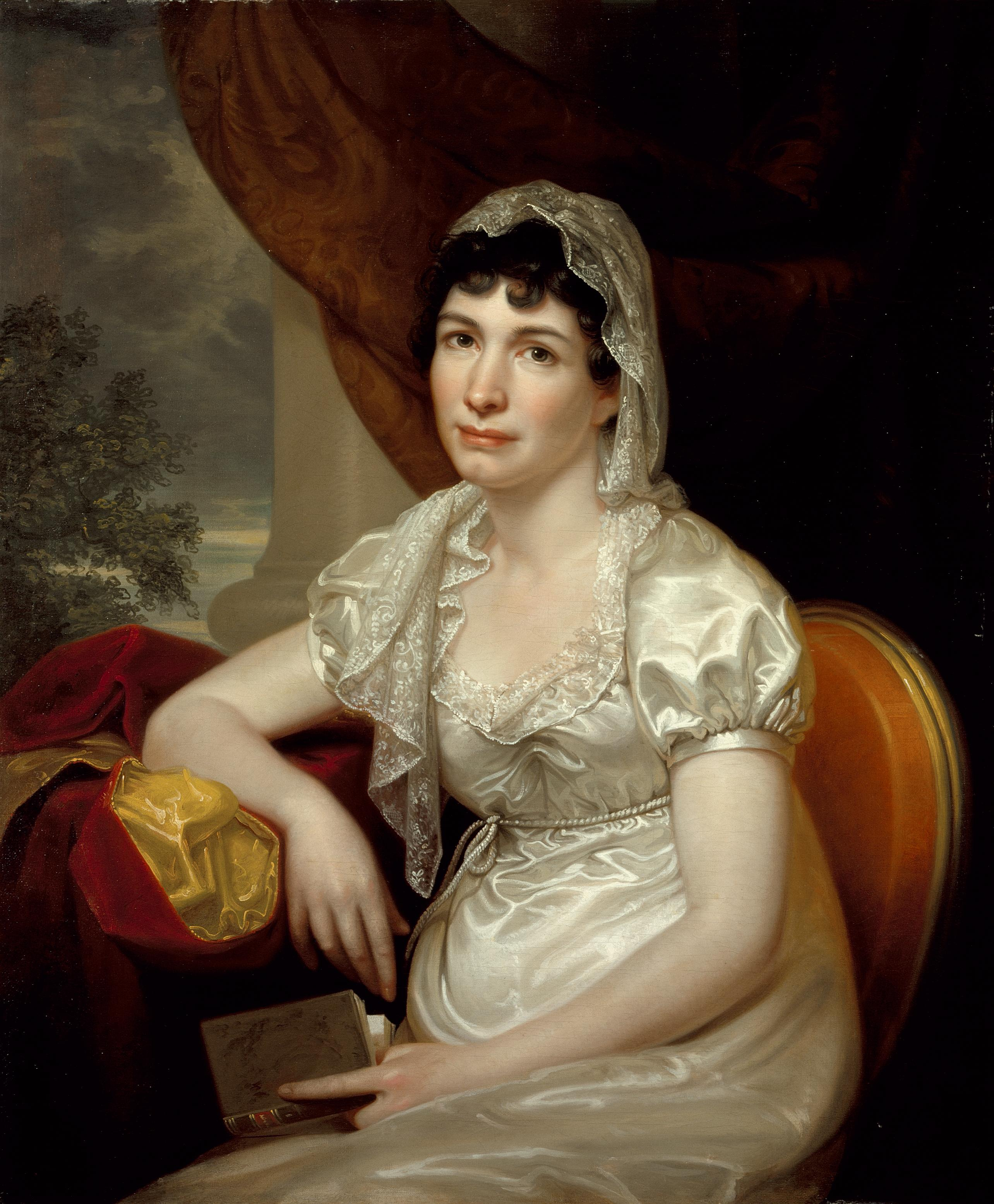
Portrait of Jane Griffith Koch, c. 1817

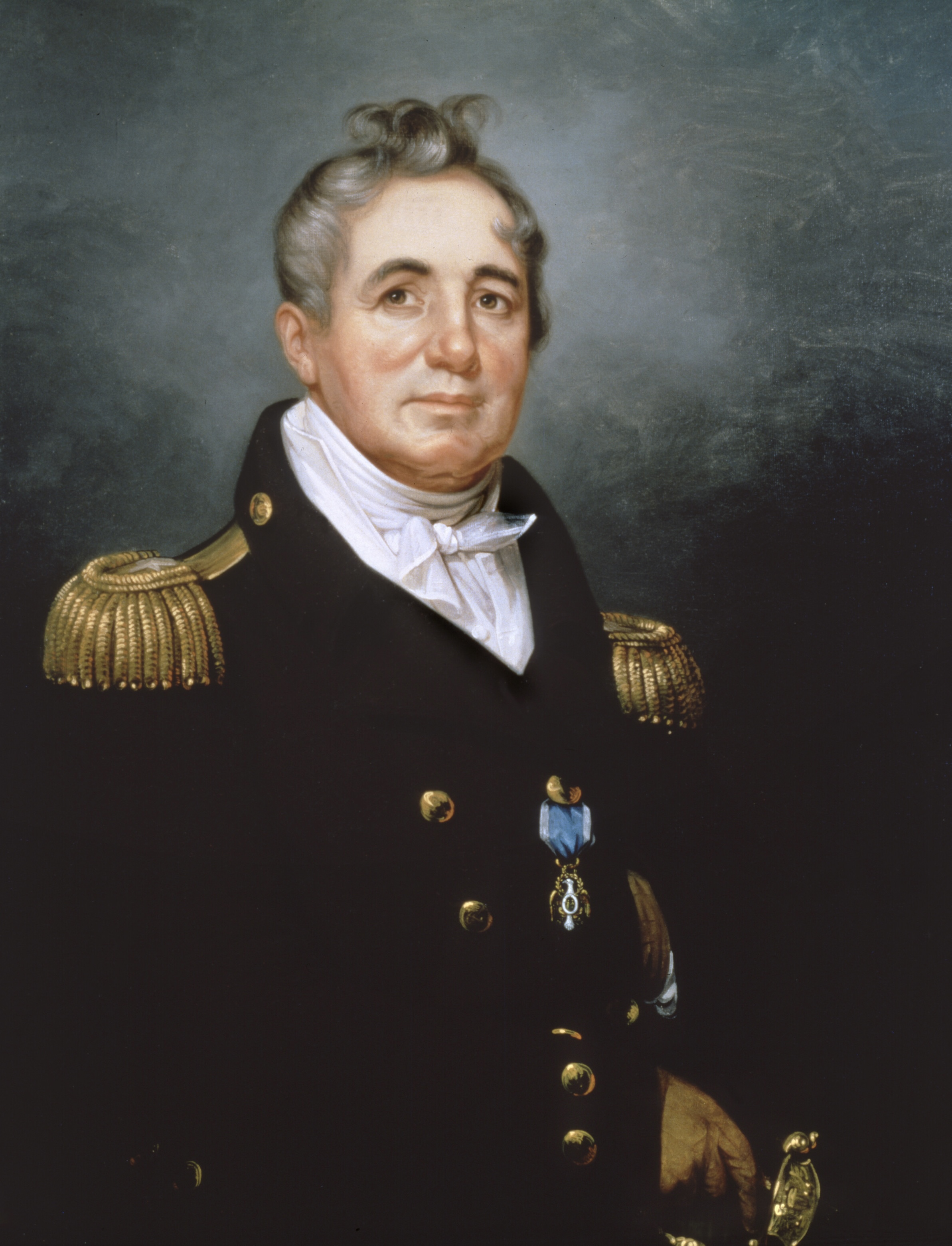
Portrait of Joshua Barney, c. 1817

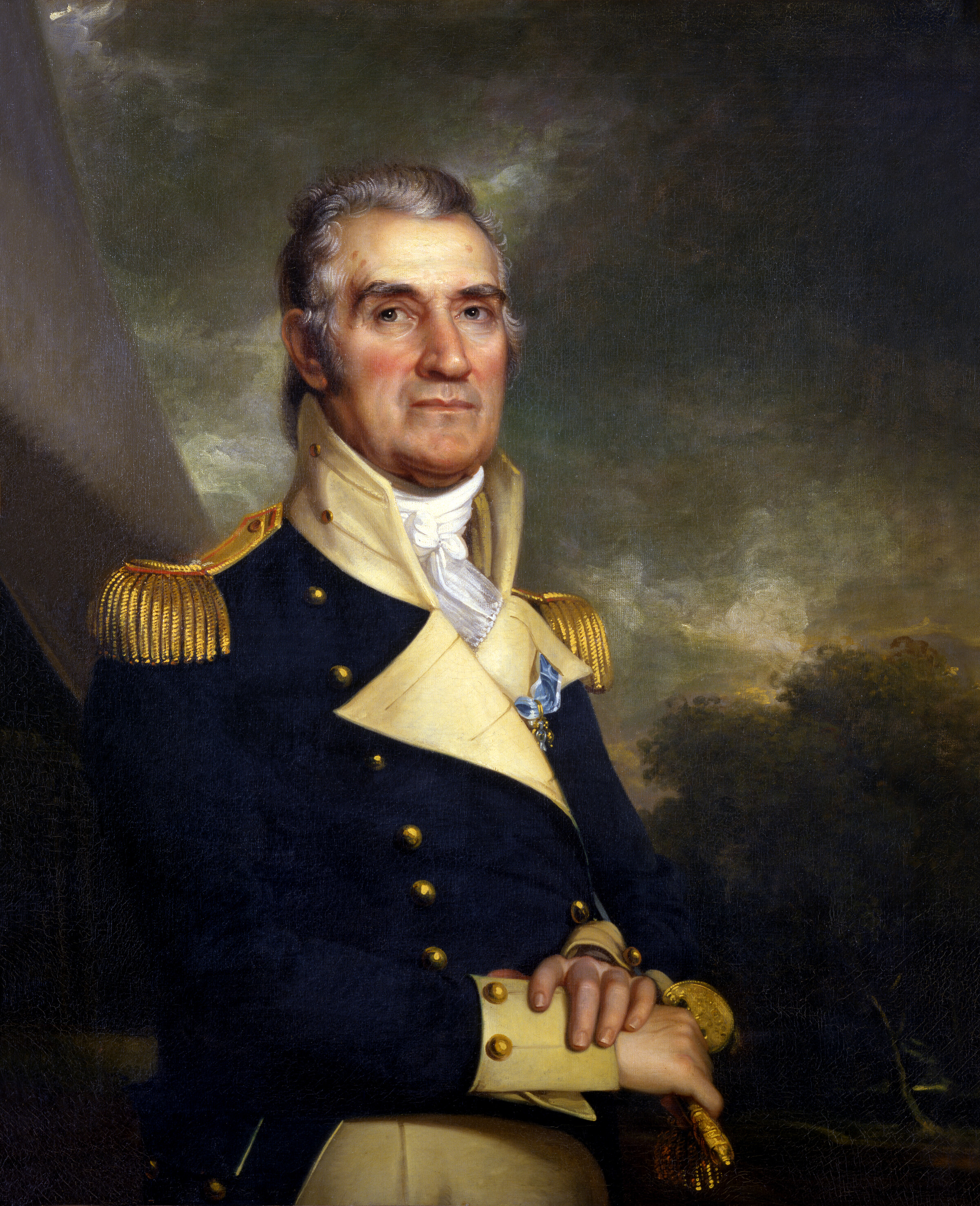
Portrait of Samuel Smith, c. 1817

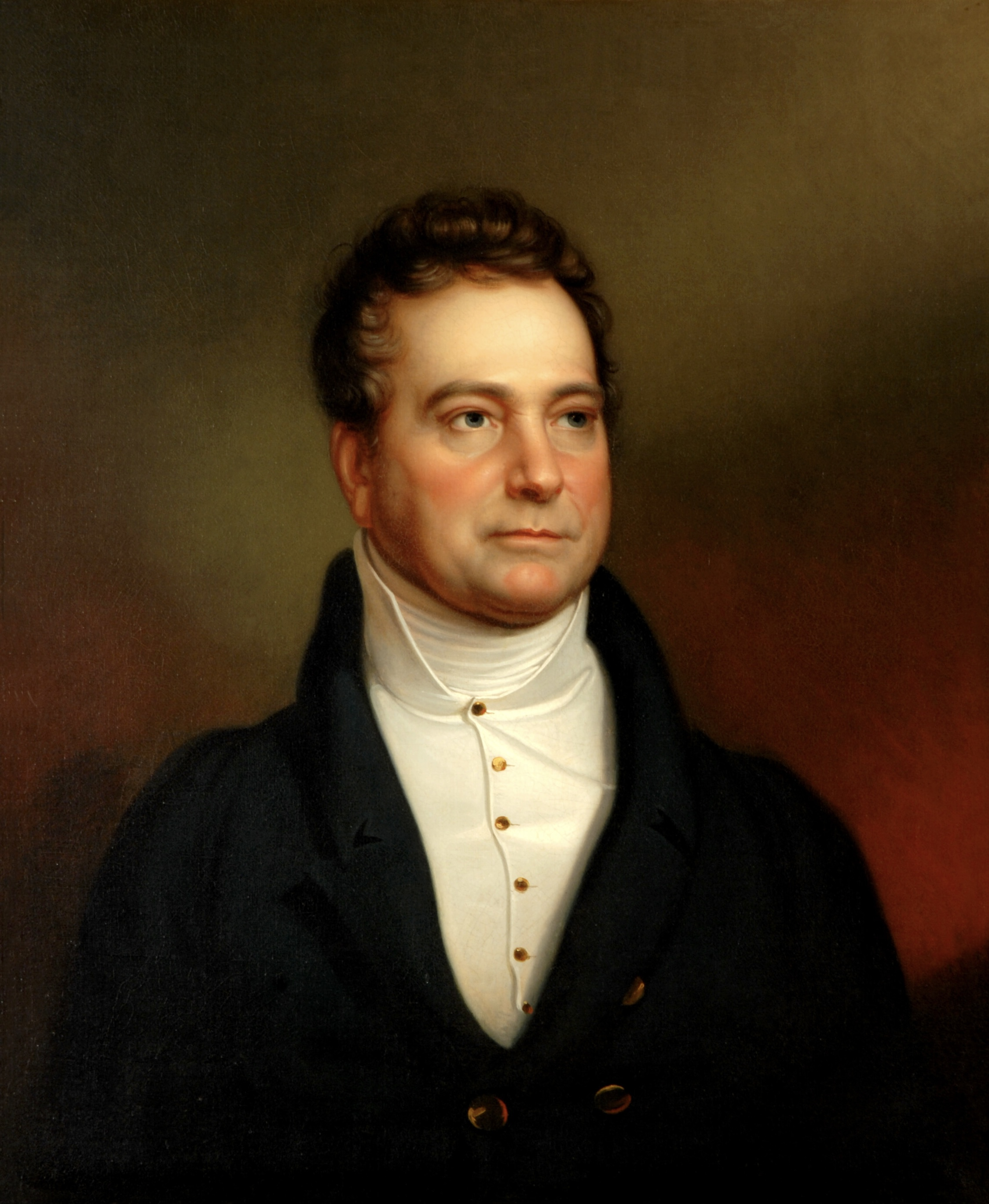
Portrait of William Pinkney, c. 1817

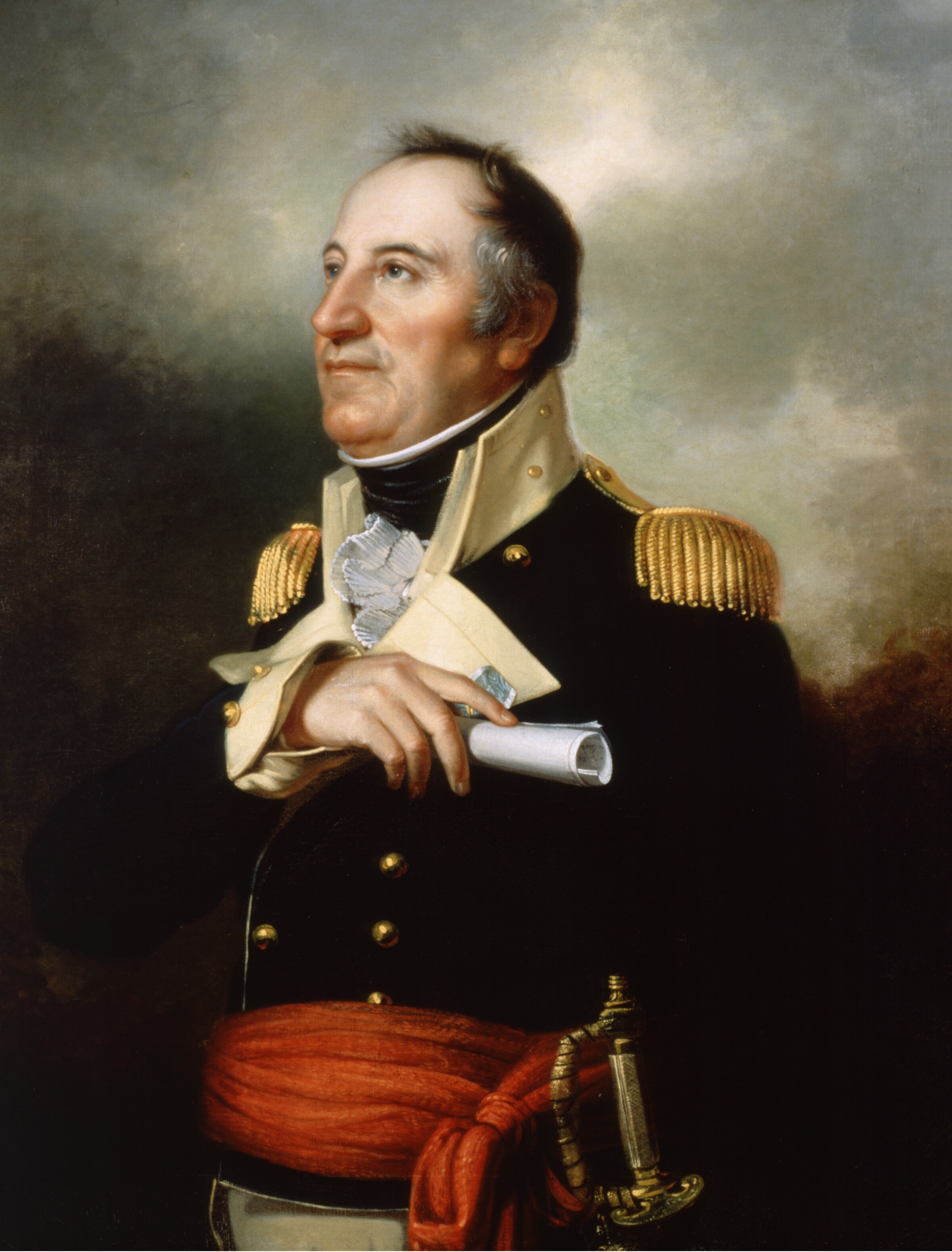
Portrait of John Stricker, c. 1817–1818

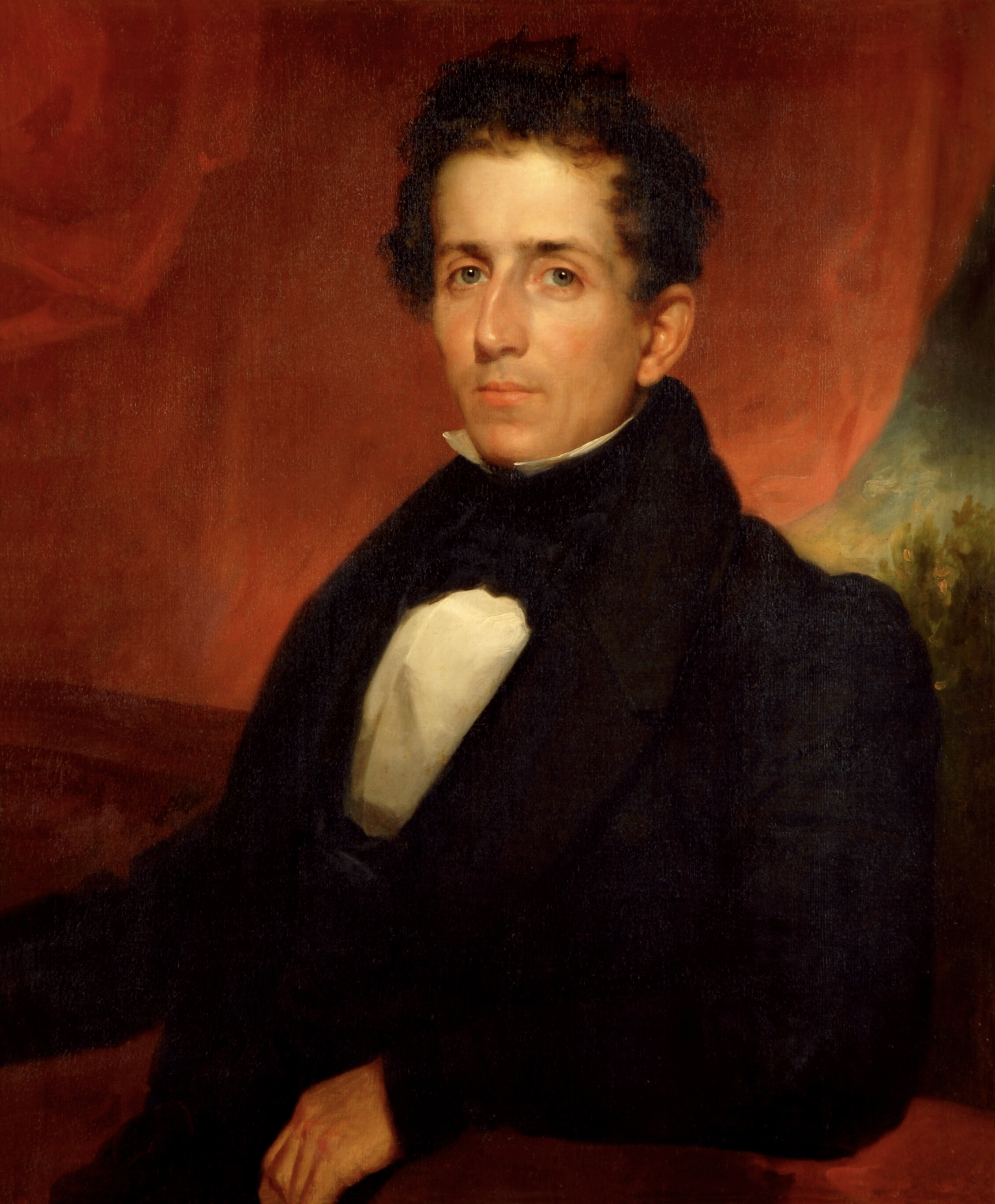
Portrait of Samuel Griswold Goodrich, c. 1820–1830

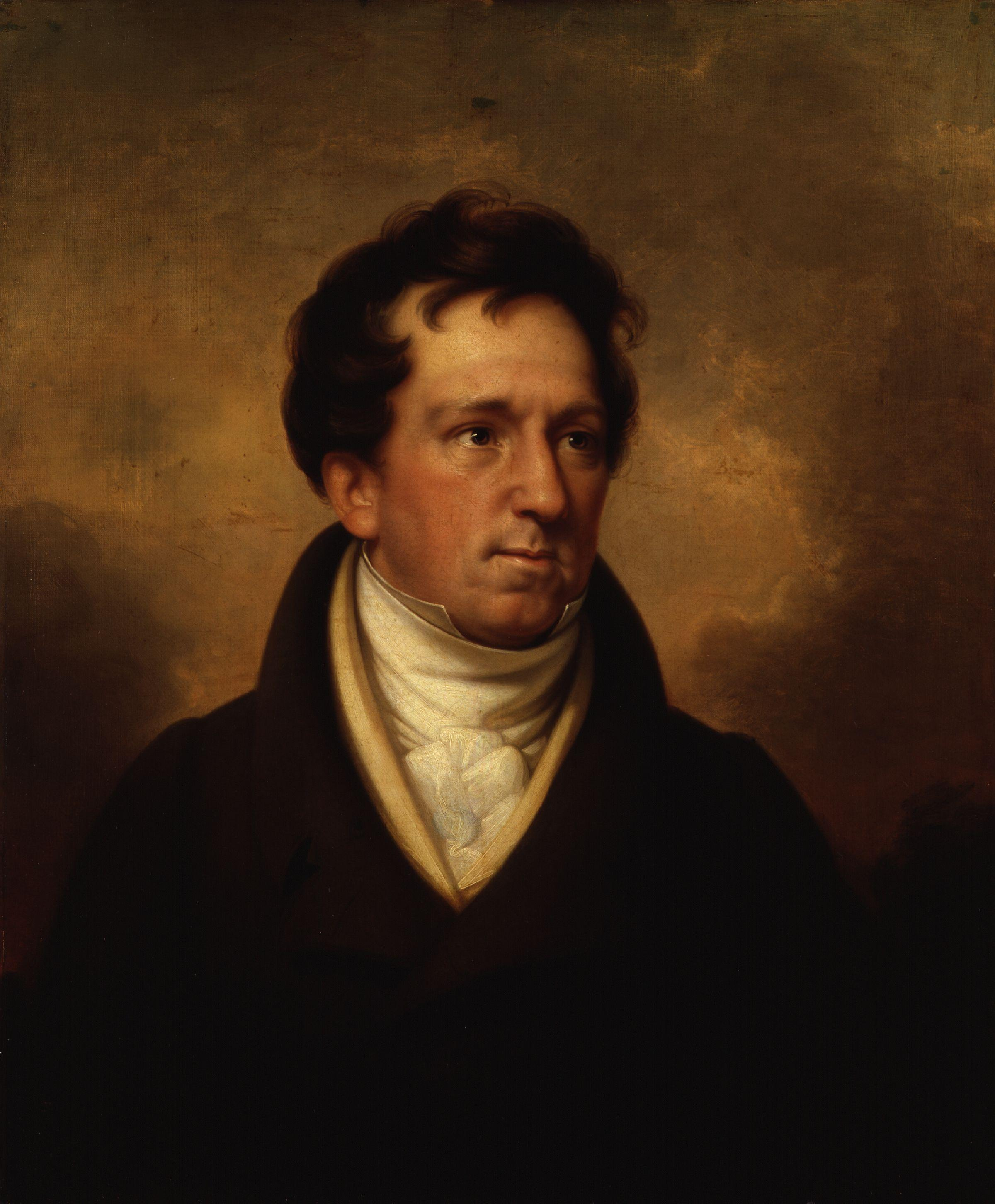
Portrait of Charles Mathews, c. 1822

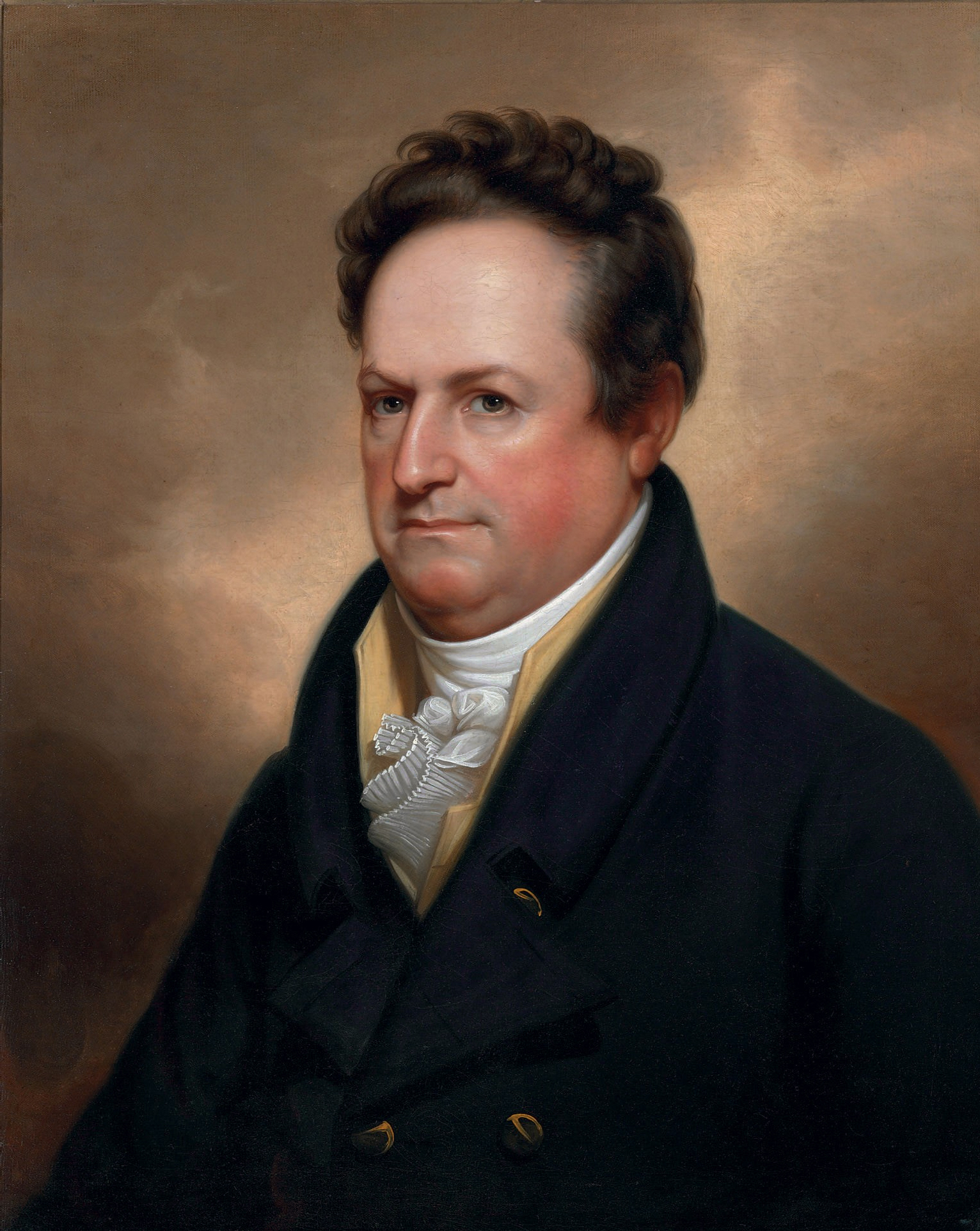
Portrait of DeWitt Clinton, c. 1823

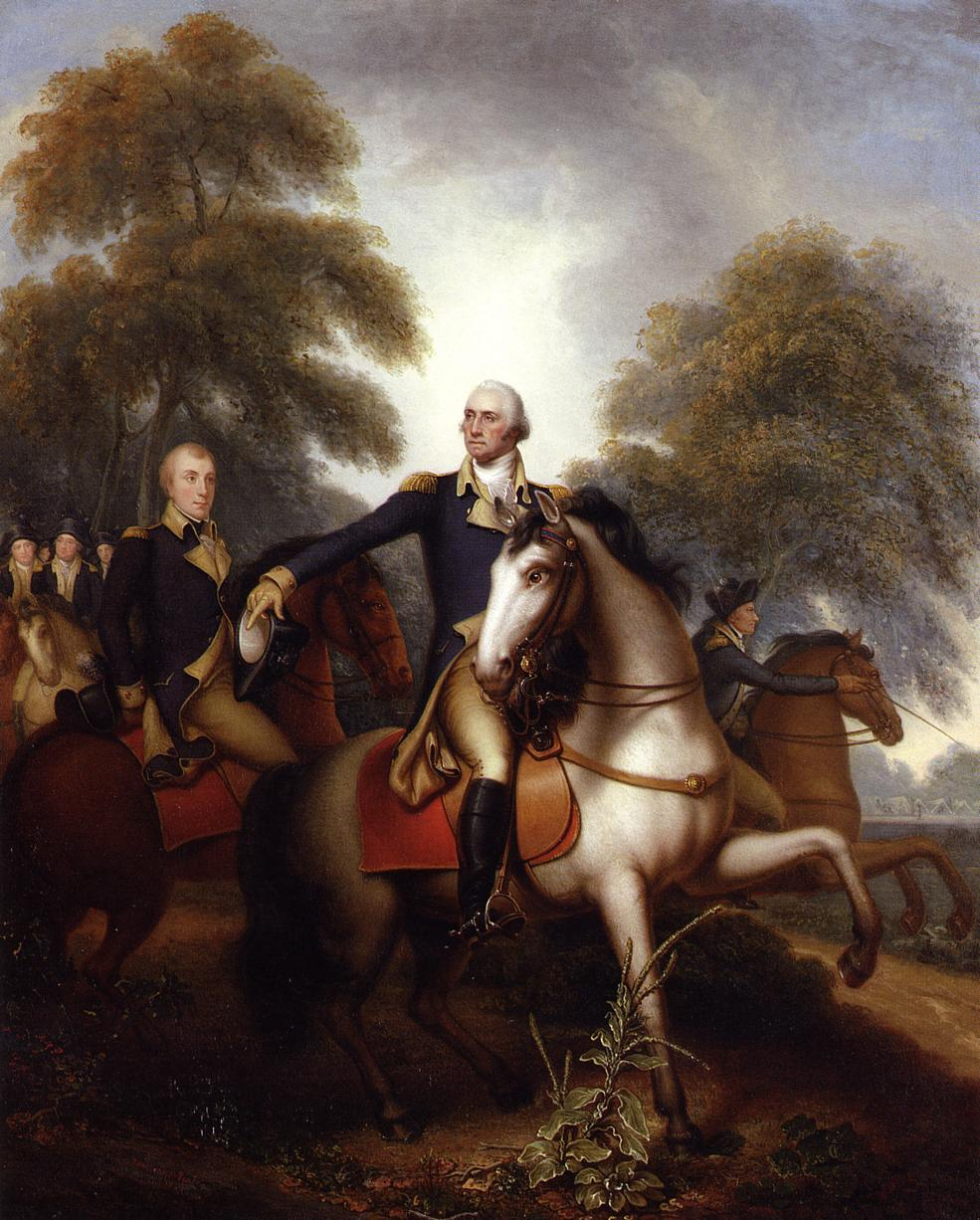
Portrait of George Washington before Yorktown, c. 1823

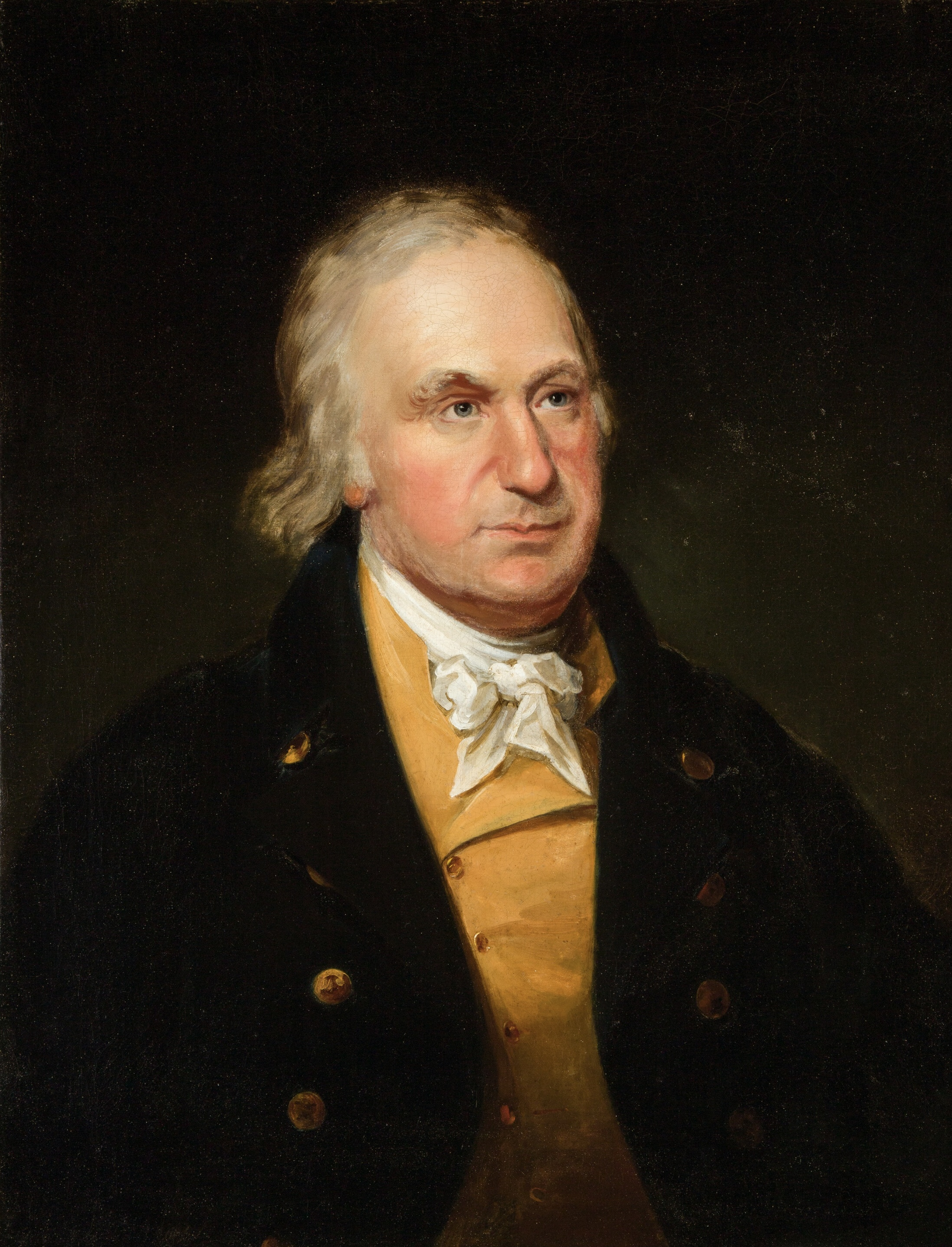
Portrait of John Eager Howard, c. 1825

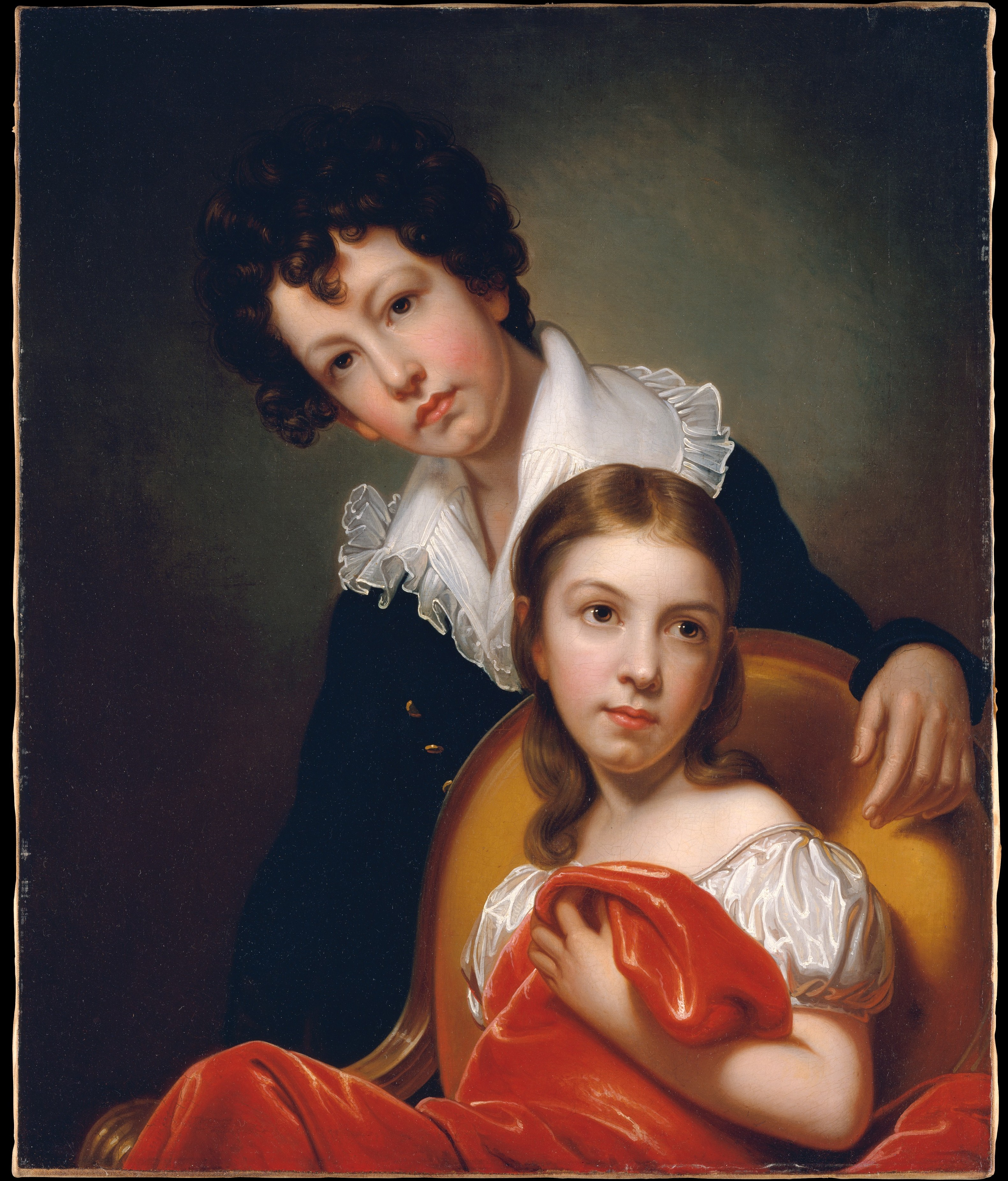
Michelangelo and Emma Clara Peale, c. 1826

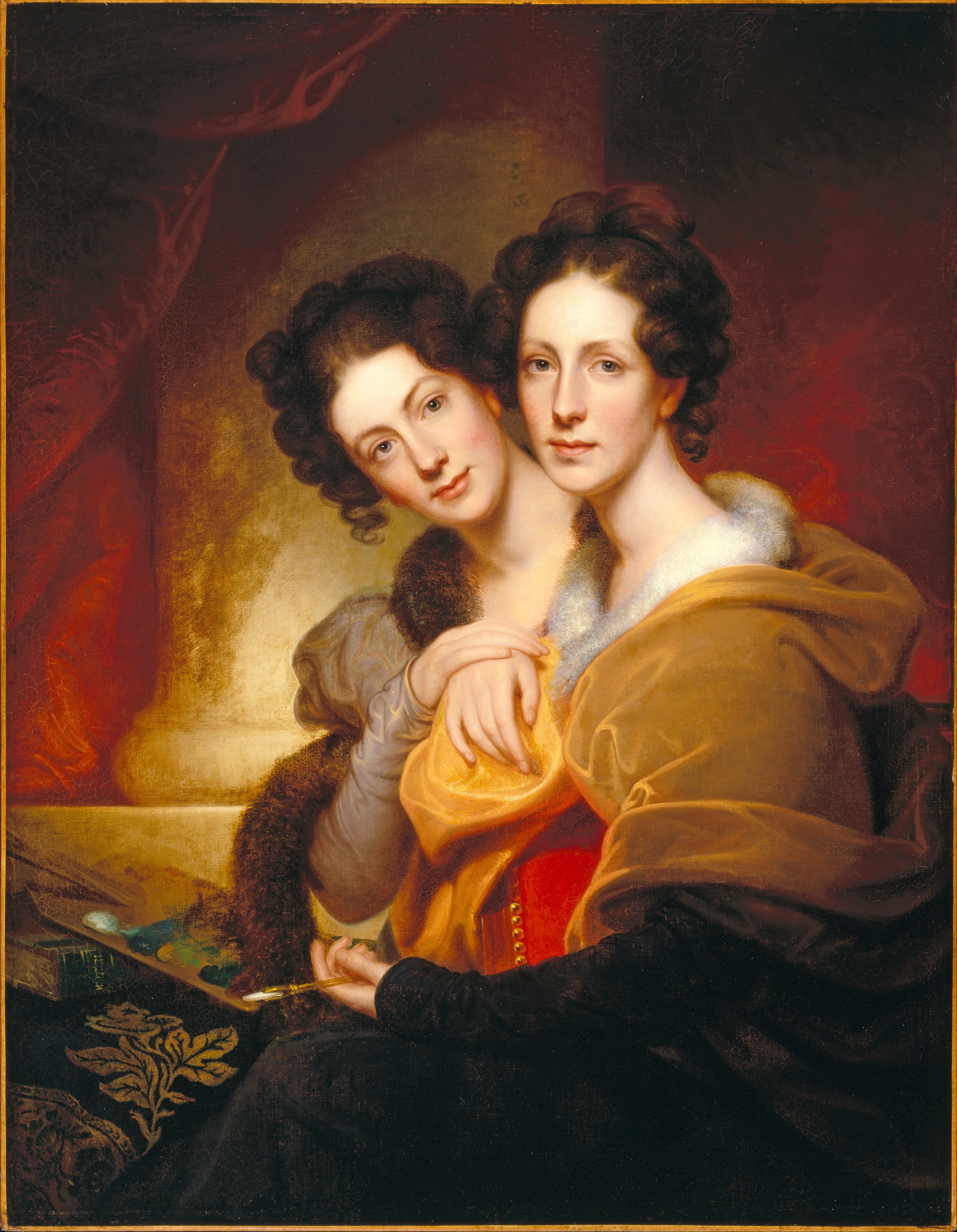
The Sisters (Eleanor and Rosalba Peale), c. 1826

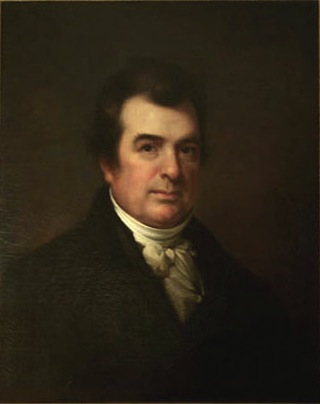
Portrait of Dr. David Hosack, c. 1826

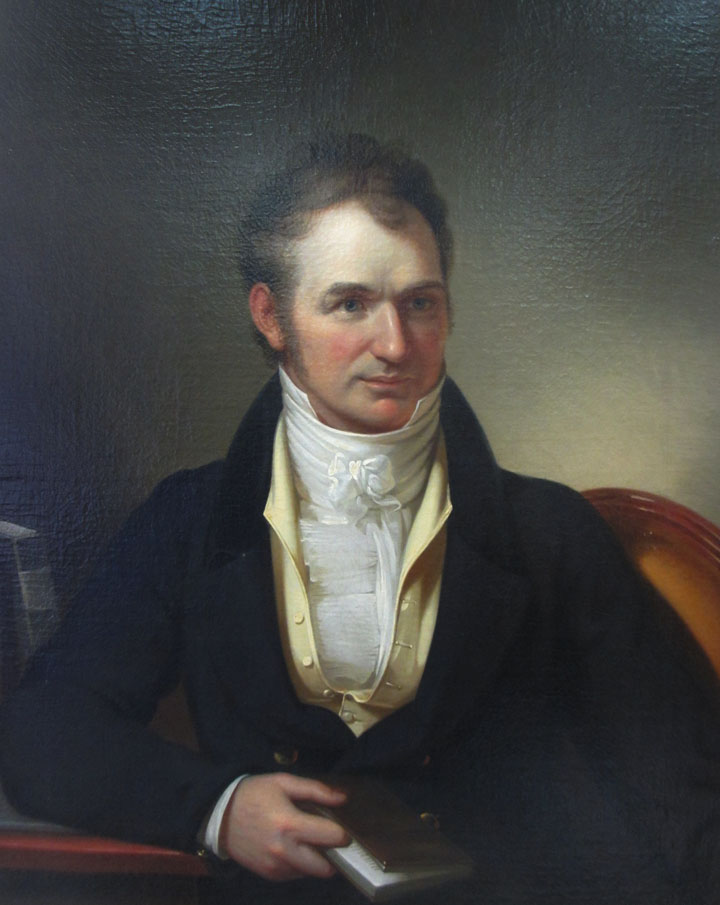
Portrait of Horace H. Hayden, c. 1828

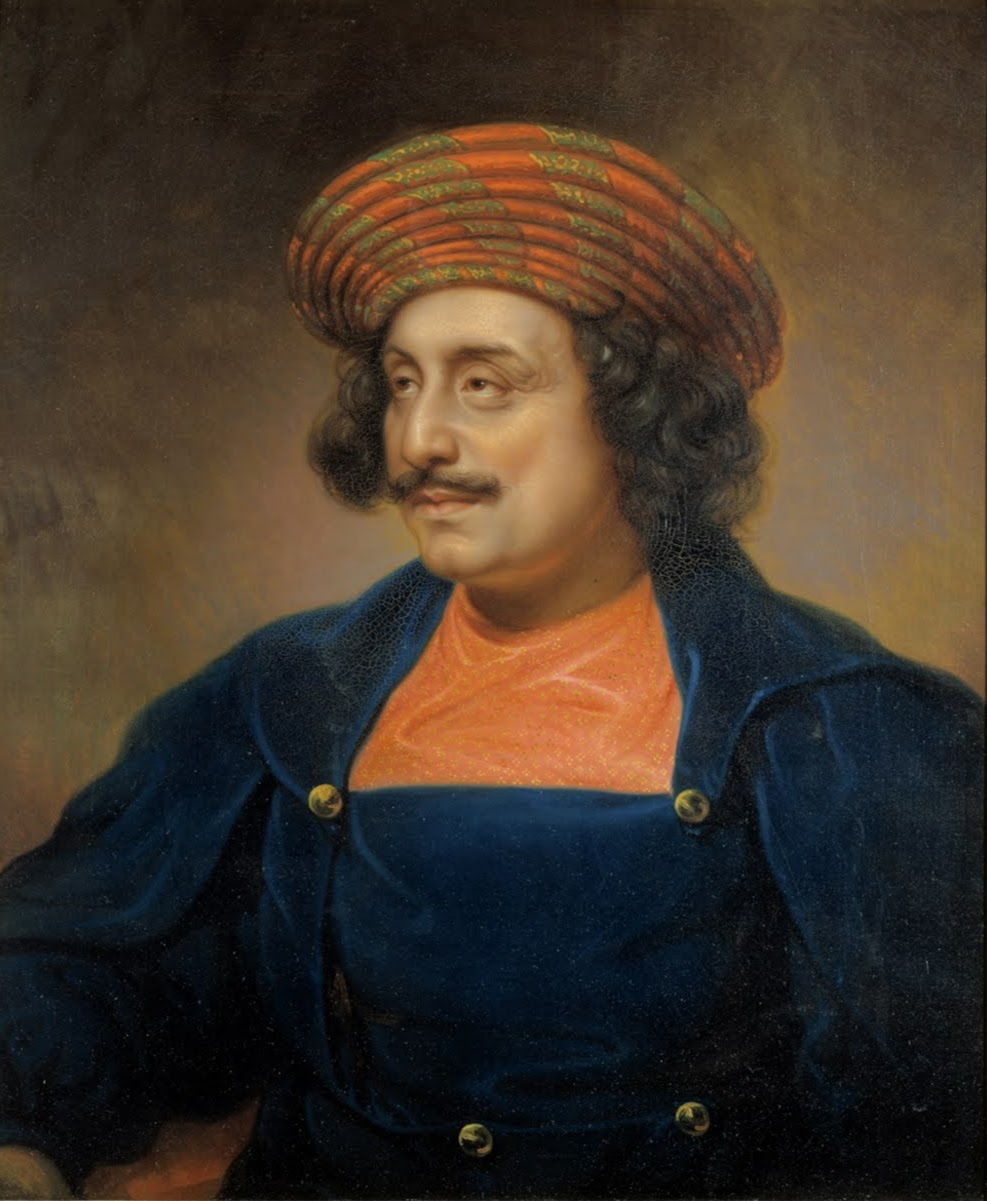
Portrait of Raja Rammohan Roy, c. 1833

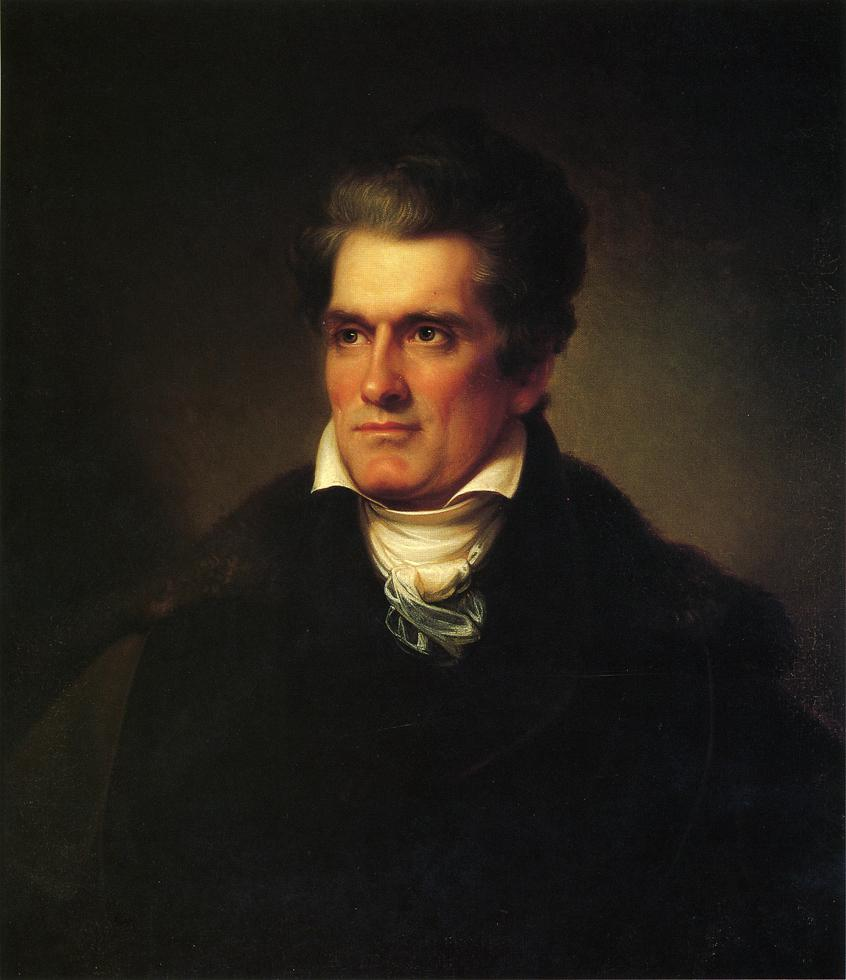
Portrait of John C. Calhoun, c. 1834

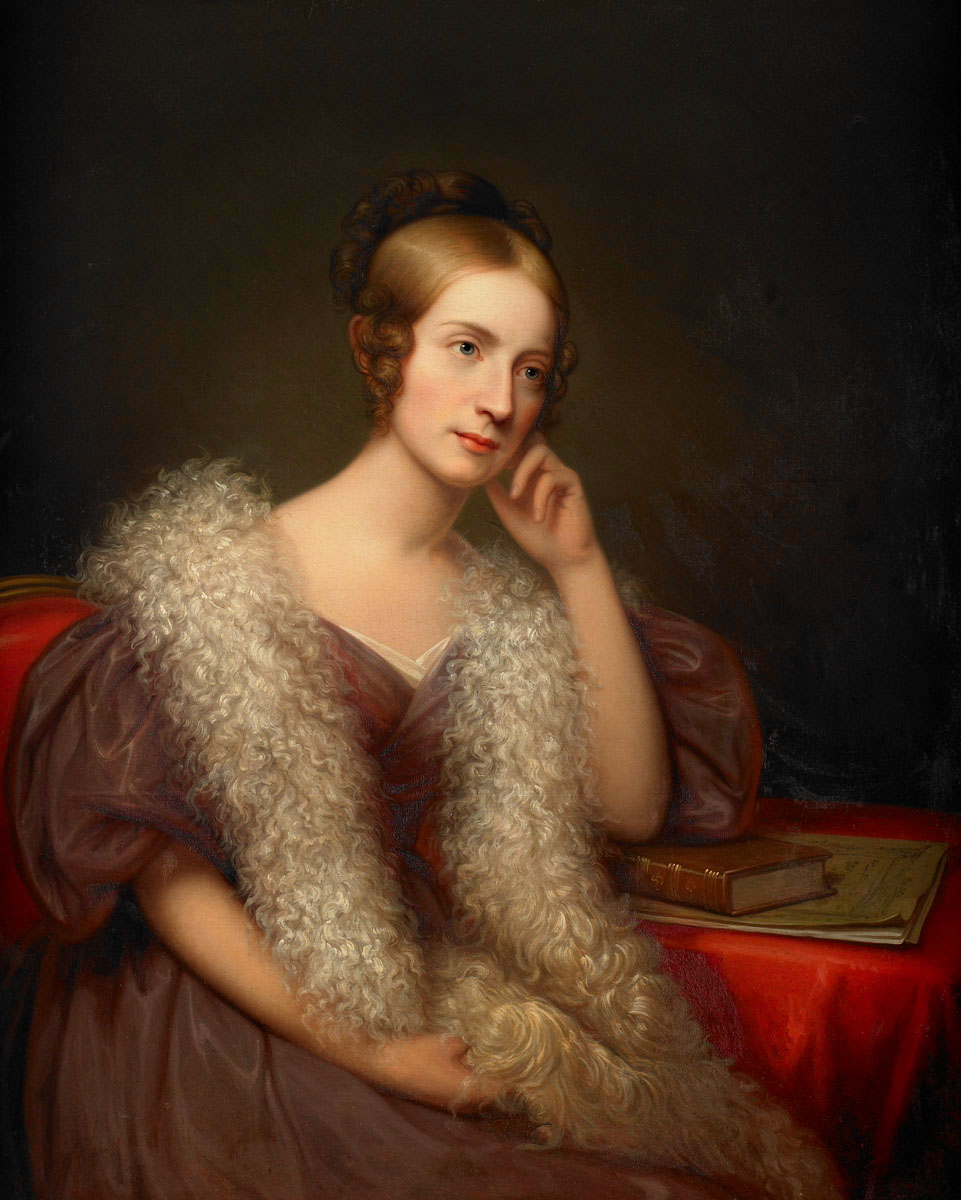
Portrait of Caroline Louisa Pratt Bartlett, c. 1836

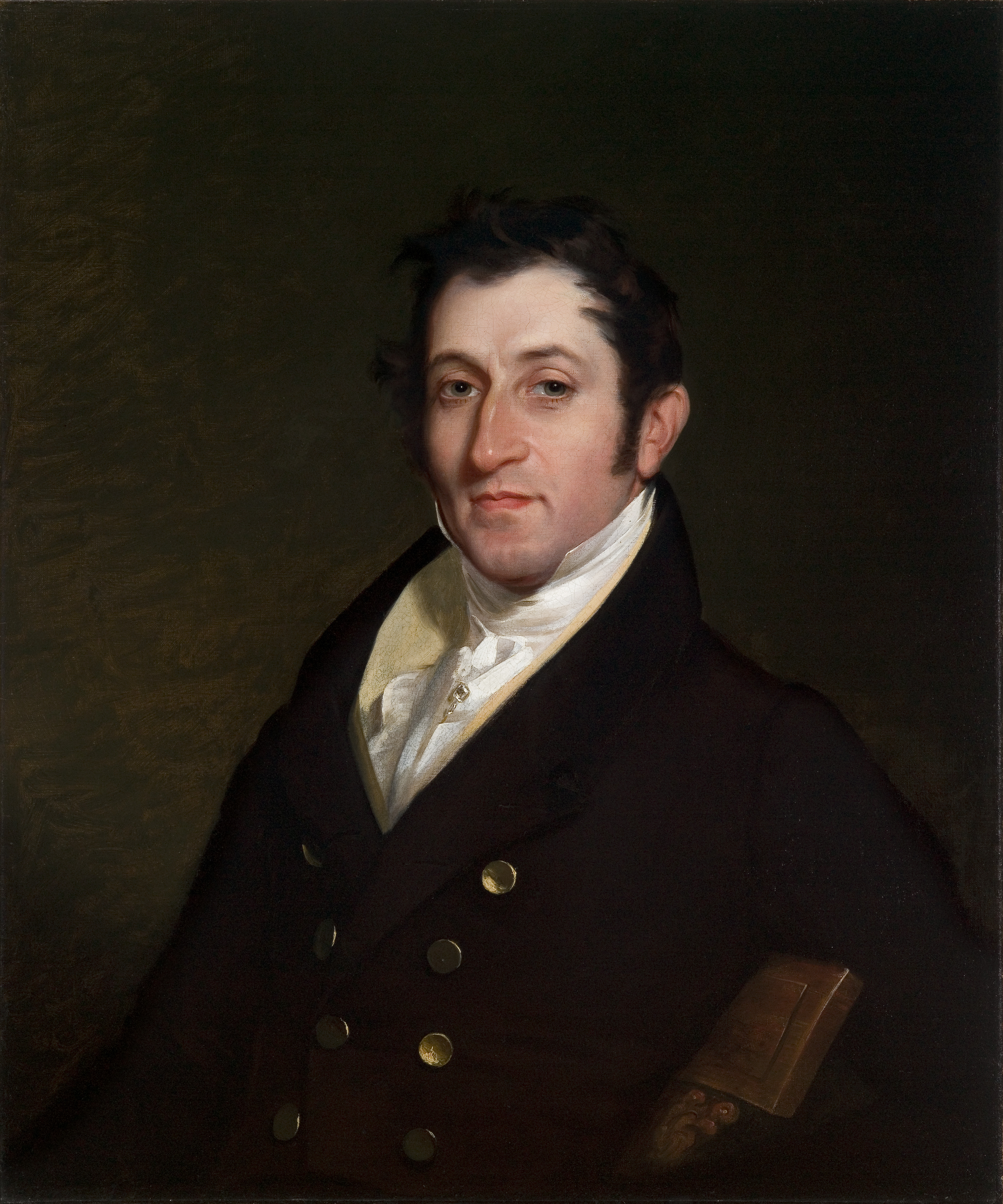
Portrait of Mendes Cohen, c. 1838

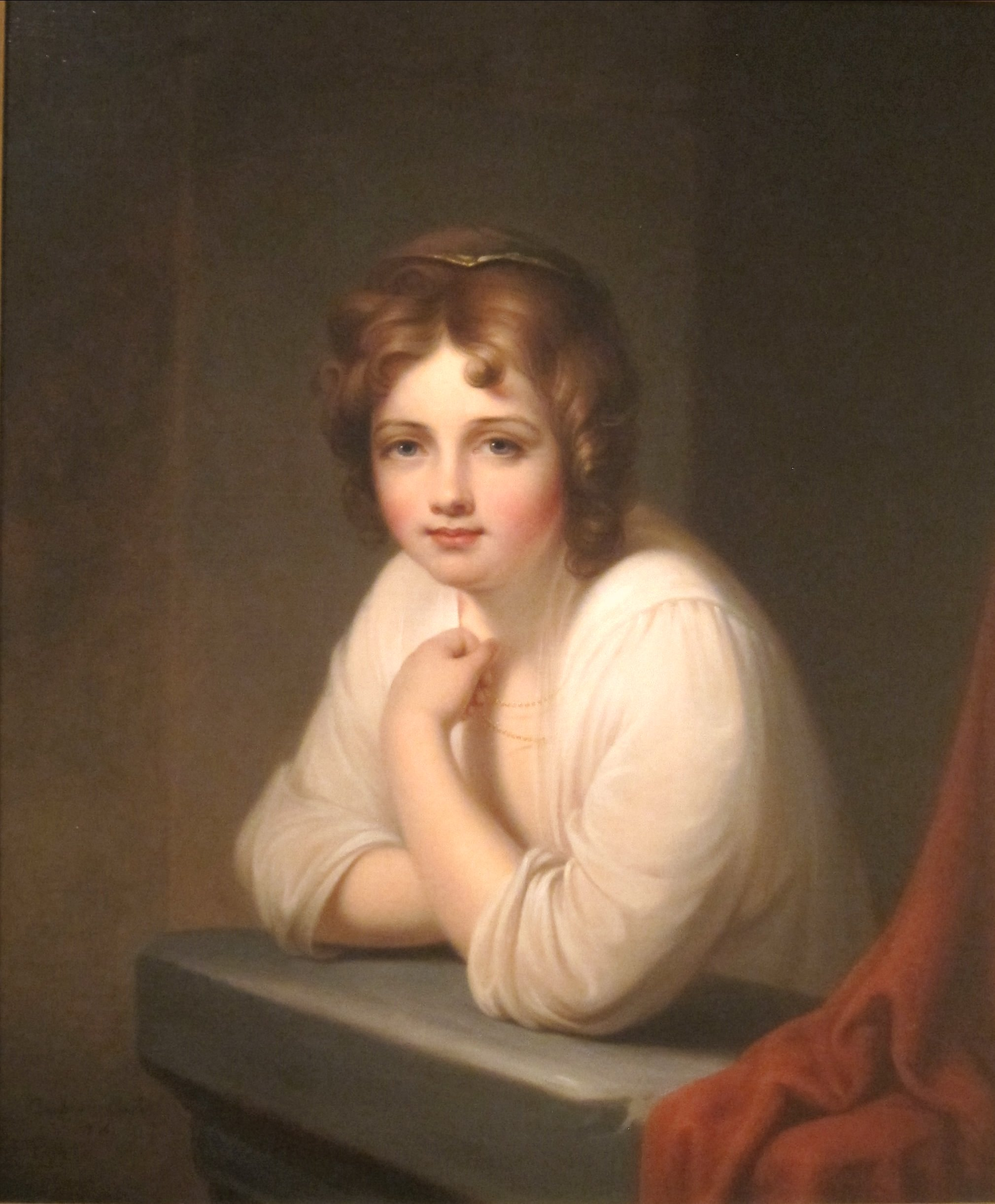
Portrait of a girl at a Window (Rosalba Peale), c. 1846

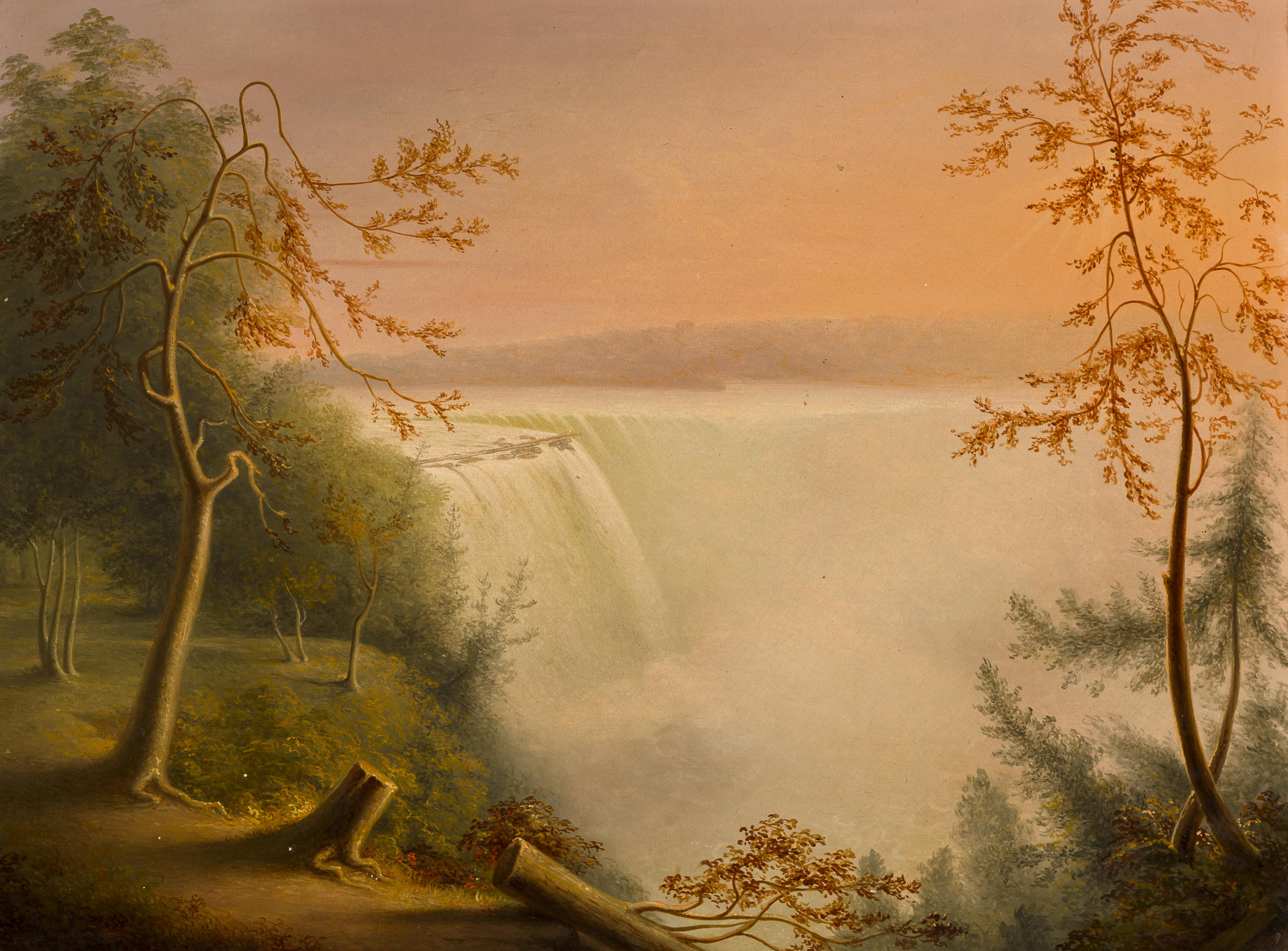
Niagara Falls c. 1849

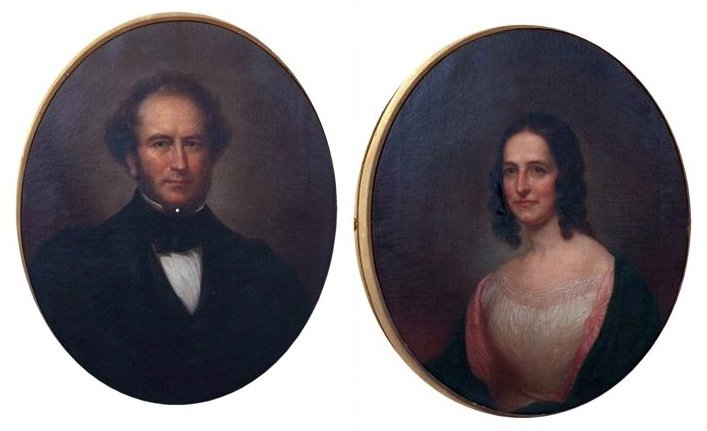
Portraits of Richard Colgate Dale Jr and Elizabeth Woodruff Dale c. 1857
