= William Gwynn =

William Gwynn may refer to:

- William Gwynn (rugby) (born 1856), Welsh rugby player
- William Gwynn (attorney) (born 1775), American attorney
