= Delphian Club =

American literary club 1816–1825

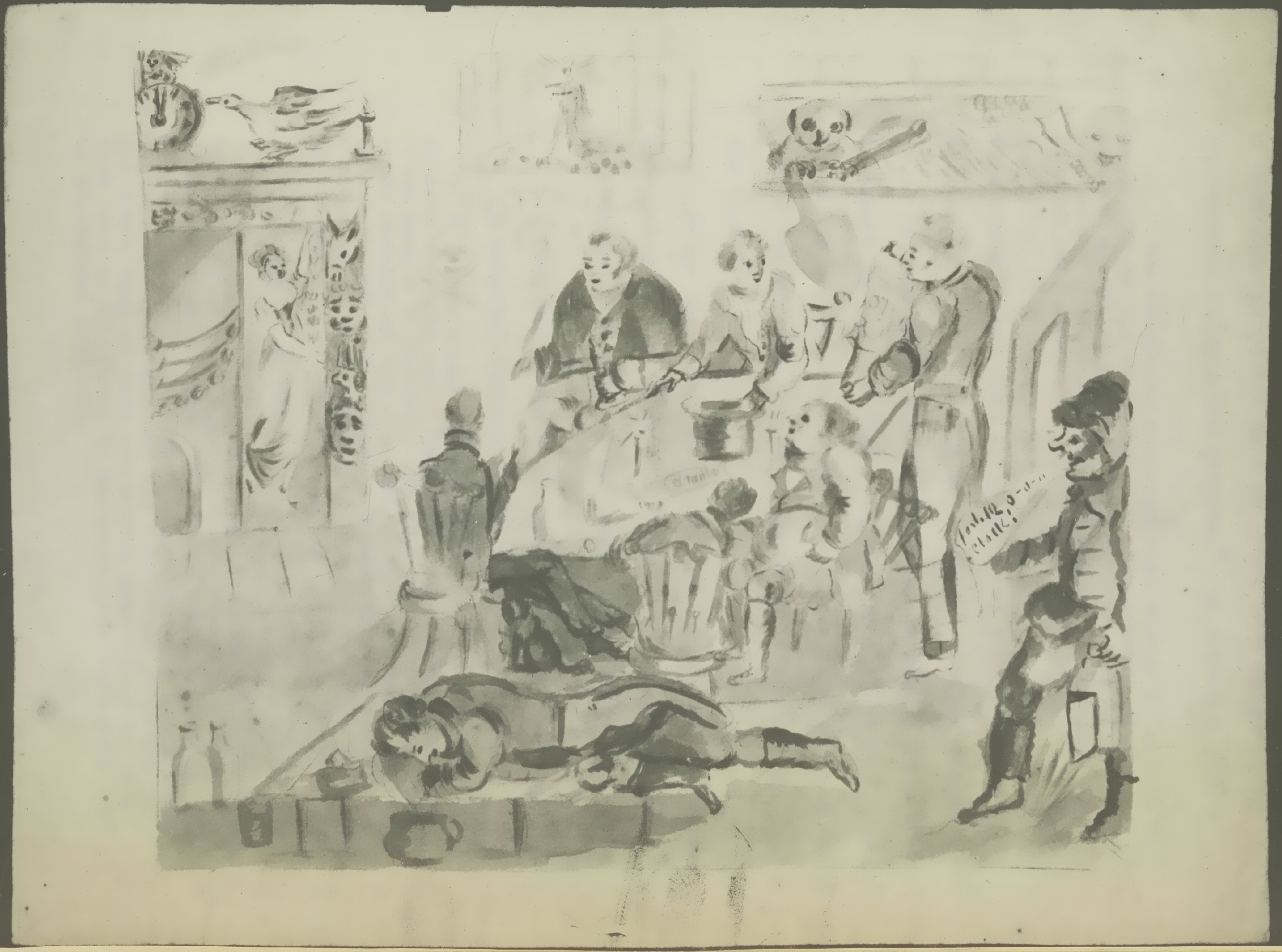
- 1817 sketch by John Neal of the first meeting in 1816
- Named after: Oracle of Delphi
- Formation: August 31, 1816; 210 years ago
- Founders: John Neal, Tobias Watkins, John Pierpont, Horace H. Hayden, William Sinclair, John Didier Readel, James H. McCulloch
- Founded at: Baltimore, Maryland, US
- Dissolved: 1825; 201 years ago
- Type: Literary club
- President: William Sinclair (1816); Tobias Watkins (1816–1823); William H. Winder (1823–1824); William Gwynn (1824–1825)
- Main organ: The Portico

The Delphian Club was an early American literary club active between 1816 and 1825. The focal point of Baltimore's literary community, Delphians like John Neal were prodigious authors and editors. The group of mostly lawyers and doctors gathered weekly to share refreshments and facetious stories, with many of their works being published in The Portico magazine. The club's structure and terminology were inspired by classical antiquity and comical verbosity. Sixteen men claimed membership over the club's nine-year run, with no more than nine serving at a time. Edgar Allan Poe satirized the group in his unpublished Tales of the Folio Club in the 1830s.

== History ==
The Delphian Club was founded in Baltimore in 1816. The number of Baltimore printers, publishers, and booksellers had doubled in the preceding years. Many residents expected the city to become America's leading cultural and commercial center following the War of 1812 and the literary community dubbed Baltimore "the Rome of the United States". Between 1816 and 1825, the city's literary focal point was the Delphian Club. Works by Delphians are common in the era's literary magazines.

Drawing from classical antiquity, Delphians facetiously claimed their group was founded in 1420 BC. The name refers to the Oracle of Delphi and club records claim the president to be a representative of Apollo. Members were each associated with one of the Muses.

The idea for the club originated with physician Tobias Watkins and failed lawyer and businessman John Pierpont, who connected in their common association with Unitarianism. They established the group at their first meeting on August 31, 1816, with Pierpont's former business partner John Neal, dentist Horace H. Hayden, Baltimore College co-founder and vice president William Sinclair, physician John Didier Readel, and physician James H. McCulloch. Sinclair was the founding president, but passed that role on to Watkins after the first few meetings. The group met every Saturday at 6:30 pm, with members taking turns hosting at their homes or offices, most of which were within the area of St. Paul, Calvert, Lexington, and Baltimore Streets. The location of each upcoming meeting was published in the Federal Gazette newspaper for the benefit of any members who were absent at the preceding meeting. The group of genteel professionals shared refreshments and facetious stories, drawing inspiration from classical antiquity. Neal wrote in 1823,

The members read essays, chase puns, wrangle vehemently and noisily about nothing, talk all together, and eat when they do eat, which I should judge could not be oftener than once a week, with inconceivable effect; and drink after the same manner.

At the end of the club's first year, members assigned each other "clubicular names" and incurred fines for "misnomers" when they failed to use those names in meetings. Neal's clubicular name reflected his reputation for profuse production of passionate literature. Others' were often derived from their personalities or professions. Members were also assigned facetious titles that came with absurd responsibilities. After meeting on the September 27, 1817, the president became known as the Tripod, because "the President should not be referred to as the chair, because the sons of Apollo should have nothing to do with a chair. He should be said to fill a tripod." The Tripod was properly addressed as "My Lud". The vice president was addressed as "His Sub-Ludship".

Watkins felt it was important that the club be not just a joyous social outlet, but also a source of creative production. Delphians took turns presenting written works to each other, choosing a topic from a list of three, developed at the preceding meeting for that particular member. Because they happened every week, members referred to them as "hebdomadal essays". For example, Neal was assigned these three choices on November 23, 1816:

"Whether Cicero or Dean Swift were the greatest poet?"
"Whether Adam had a Navel?"
"Which should be first on the sign of a Cabinet maker, a coffin, a cradle, or a bedstead?"

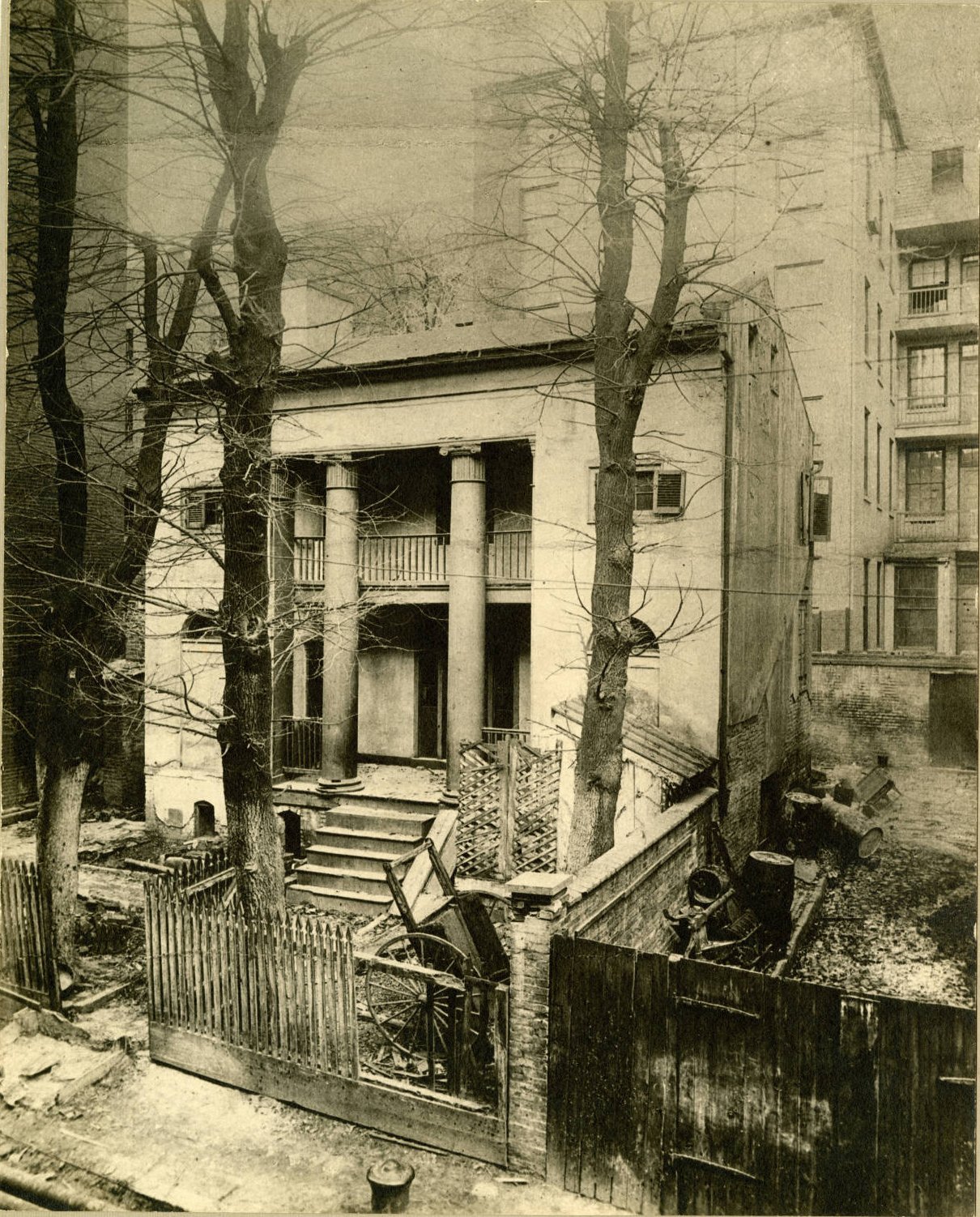
Gwynn's Tusculum

Twelve newspapers had editors in the club and the club's sixteen members published at least 48 books of fiction, history, travel, letters, and biography, as well as nine volumes of poetry, one play, and nineteen speeches. Many Delphians wrote contributions to the daily Journal of the Times newspaper, of which Paul Allen was editor. The club's organ was The Portico literary magazine, of which Watkins was editor. At their thirty-second meeting on April 5, 1817, the group decided to require regular submissions from members. In 1821, Watkins published a bound collection of three stories titled Tales of the Tripod; Or, A Delphian Evening. The first is a translation from German of a story by Heinrich Zschokke. The second two are about Paul Allen, but are cryptic to a reader who has not read the club records. Neal used his clubicular name Jehu O'Cataract as a pen name when he published his epic poem Battle of Niagara in 1818. His first novel, Keep Cool (1817) was published under the pen name "Somebody, M.D.C.", in which the acronym stands for "member of the Delphian Club". Seven members collaboratively authored an unpublished novel called Incomprehensibility by taking turns writing chapters. Historian John Earle Uhler described it as "entirely devoid of merit, being vague, verbose, and tiresome".

Meetings were discontinued during a yellow fever epidemic from August 1821 to August 1823. When the club resumed meetings, membership elected William H. Winder as president to replace Watkins, who was then in federal prison for embezzlement from the US Treasury. William Gwynn replaced Winder after the latter's death in 1824 and served until the group's dissolution in 1825. Gwynn hosted all the club's meetings after August 1824 at his home on Bank Lane near St. Paul Street, which he called the Tusculum. This final year was the club's most active and festive. The official club records, kept by Secretary Readel, became public when the Maryland Historical Society assumed ownership in 1920.

== Membership ==
Sixteen men claimed membership between 1816 and 1825, with no more than nine serving at a time. Aside from the members, club records mention visitors Quizzifer Wuggs, Baron Brobdignag, Le Compere Mathieu, Peter Paragraph, Stoffle von Plump, Occasional Punnifer, and Don Gusto Comerostros. Some of these clubicular names may apply to men who were associated with the group and may have attended meetings, but who never joined, including Robert Goodloe Harper, Samuel Woodworth, William Wirt, John Howard Payne, Peter H. Cruse, John P. Kennedy, William West, Fielding Lucas Jr., Francis Foster, William Frick, John Cole, James Sheridan Knowles, Philip Laurenson, Francis Scott Key, and Rembrandt Peale. In addition, club records claim Alexander the Great and Julius Caesar as members to reinforce the organization's purported ancient origin. Delphians invited many prominent men like Lord Byron to become honorary members, but none accepted.

Members of the Delphian Club
Name	Clubicular name	Organizational title	Term of membership
John Neal	Jehu O'Cataract	Professor of Jocology (science of joking); Historical Painter (sketch artist to record club events); Magister Facetiarum of the Office of the Joke Master General (explainer of jokes to extinguish their humor); "Sargeant — and at Arms, pro. tem. until a better can be found"	August 31, 1816 – January 8, 1820
William Sinclair	Muggius Sin-clear		August 31, 1816 — ?
John Didier Readel	Blearix von Crambograph	Poet Laureate; Custo-Sig (secretary); Treasurer; Professor of Crambology and Oratology	August 31, 1816 — ?
Tobias Watkins	Pertinax Particular	Tripod (President), August 31, 1816 – August 1823	August 31, 1816 — ?
James H. McCulloch	Abraham Kenuckkofritz	Historical Painter (following Neal's resignation)	August 31, 1816 — ?
John Pierpont	Hiero Heptaglott		August 31, 1816 – April 25, 1818
Horace H. Hayden	Jasper Hornblende		August 31, 1816 — ?
Joseph D. Learned	Surrogate Sackvert		November 2, 1818 – August 22, 1818
E. Denison	Precipitate Pasquin	Flamen (Vice President)	
Henry Marie Brackenridge	Peregrine Bochinjochelus		
Paul Allen	Solomon Fitz Quizz	Professor of Loblology (endeavoring to do the impossible) and Chrononhoronthology (meaningless verbosity)	
William Gwynn	Odopoeus Oligostichus	Flamen (Vice President); Professor of Impromptology (impromptu speeches); Tripod (President), June 1824 – 1825	
William H. Winder	Opechancanough Sulekouqui	Professor of Kolakology (effective flattery); Tripod (President), August 1823 – June 1824	
Thomas Maund	Damun ap Ramrod, Lothario Meliboeus		
Julius Timoleon Ducatel	Basaltes Cranioscopus		
John H. B. Latrobe	Orlando Garangula, Choleric Combustible, Sir John Mittimus of Mittimus Hall		July 10, 1824 – 1825

== In popular culture ==
Edgar Allan Poe's unpublished collection of eleven satirical stories, Tales of the Folio Club (circa 1832–1836), is based on the Delphian Club. Poe was familiar with the club through his association with Gwynn, who studied law alongside Poe's father, employed Poe's cousin, and helped him publish Al Aaraaf, Tamerlane and Minor Poems (1829). The character of Mr. Snap is a satire of John Neal's Delphian Club persona and the story "Raising the Wind; or Diddling Considered as One of the Exact Sciences", attributed to Snap, is a satire of Neal's facetiously verbose writing for the club, as well as later writing in The Yankee. Neal himself included a fictionalized Delphian Club meeting in his 1823 novel Randolph, in which he referred to the group as "a heap of intellectual rubbish and glitter".
