= Rosalba Carriera Peale =

American painter (1799–1874)

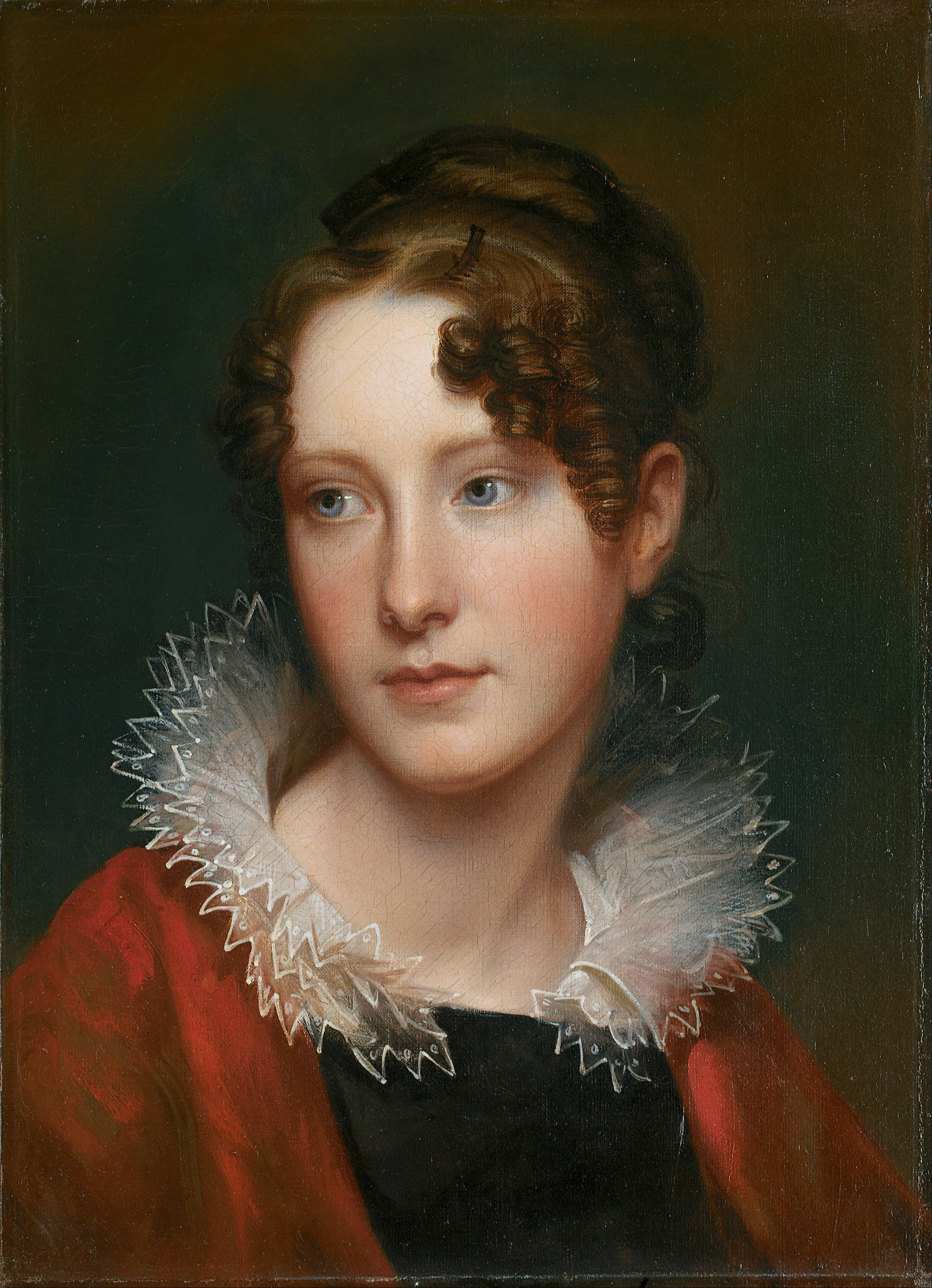
Portrait of Rosalba Carriera Peale by her father, Rembrandt Peale, c. 1820.

Rosalba Carriera Peale (28 July 1799 – November 15, 1874) was an American portraitist, landscape painter, and lithographer. She was the eldest daughter of artist Rembrandt Peale and granddaughter of Charles Willson Peale.

== Early life ==
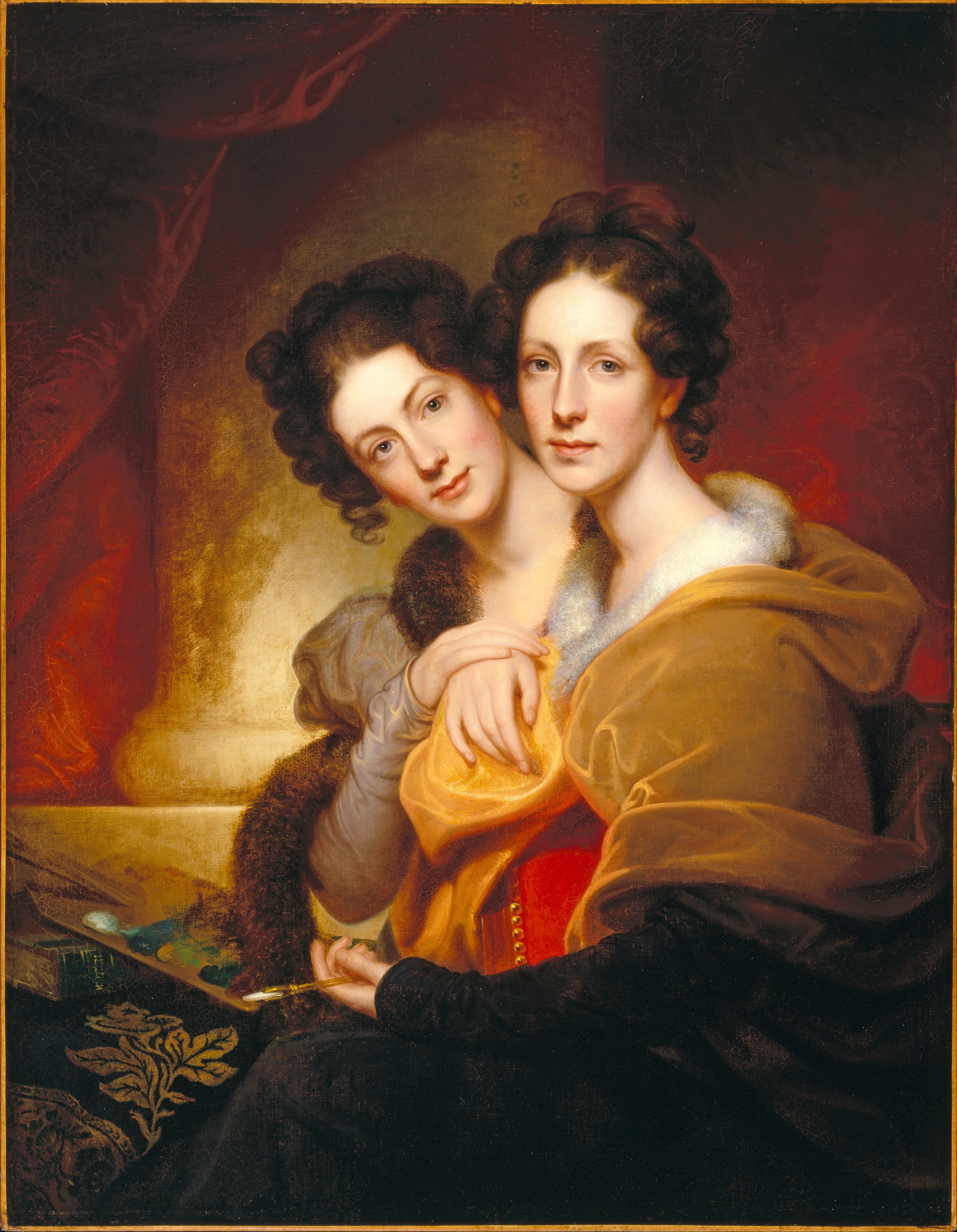
An 1826 portrait of Rosalba and her sister, Eleanor, by Rembrandt Peale.

Rosa was born in Philadelphia, Pennsylvania, in 1799 and was named after Rosalba Carriera, a Venetian Rococo artist who specialized in portrait miniatures and pastel. She was the eldest of nine children born to Eleanor May (née Short) Peale (1776–1836) and her husband, Rembrandt Peale (1778–1860), an artist and museum curator who was a prolific portrait painter. After her mother's death in 1836, her father remarried to one of his art students, Harriet Cany, who continued to paint after their marriage in 1840.

Her paternal grandparents were Rachel (née Brewer) Peale and Charles Willson Peale, also a prominent painter. Among her large family were many prominent people, including Raphaelle Peale (a painter), Rubens Peale (a museum administrator and artist), Franklin Peale (Chief Coiner at the Philadelphia Mint), and Titian Ramsay Peale (who became a naturalist).

== Career ==
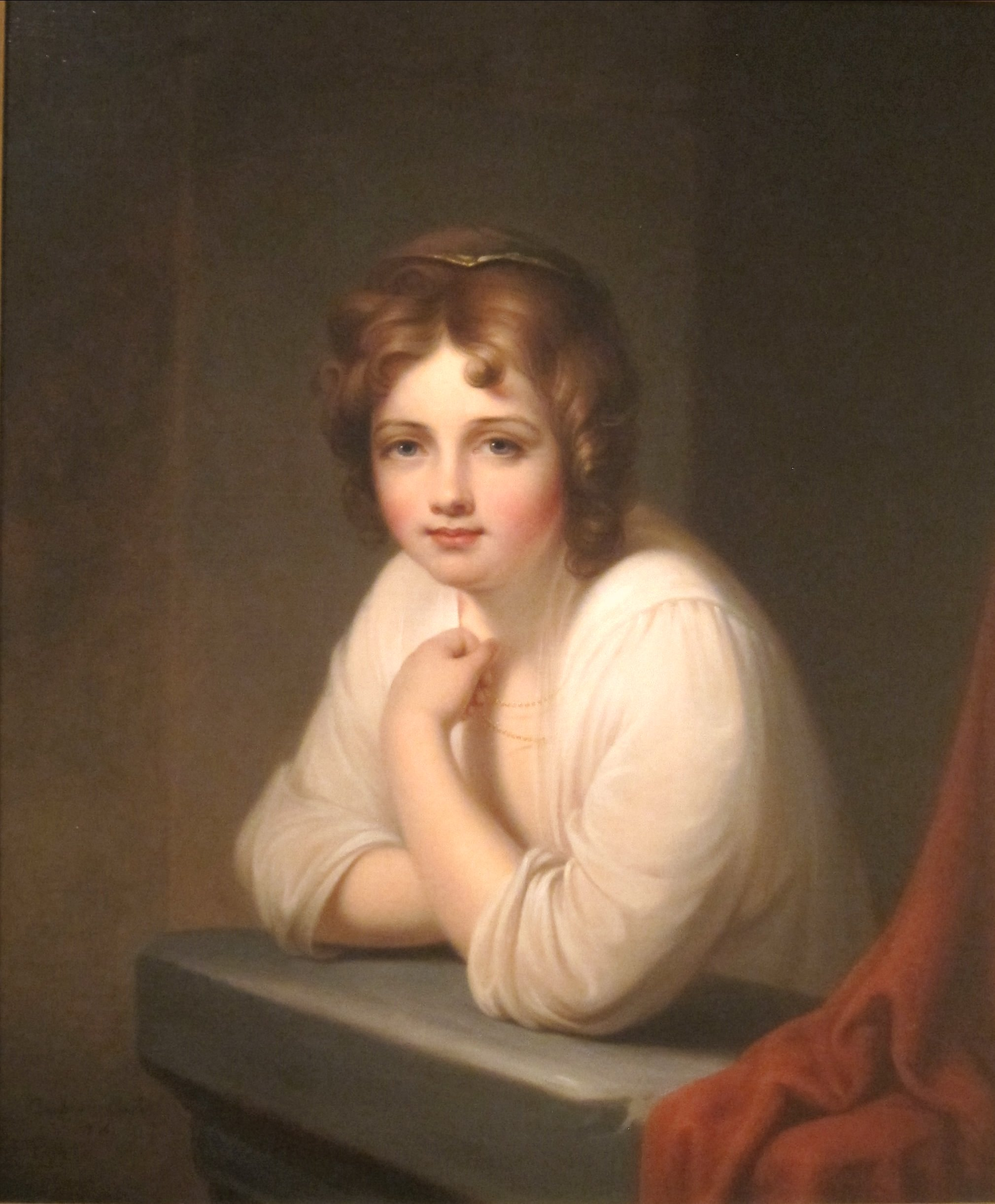
Girl at a Window, by Peale, 1846.

Rosalba was tutored in art by her father and raised her as an independent and strong-minded woman. Her contemporary, John Neal, an author and critic, wrote that Rosa's "mind is excellent. Her father has always taught her to think for herself, to reason, and to be firm, without wrangling or argument, in the expression of her opinions."

Following in her father's and grandfather's footsteps, Rosalba became an artist in her own right. She was known as an accomplished portraitist, landscape painter, and lithographer. She was also known for her abilities as a "copyist".

In 1873, she presented her father's painting, Washington before Yorktown, which was valued at $10,000 (equivalent to $262,472 today), to the Mount Holly Association of New Jersey.

== Personal life ==
Reportedly, she had many suitors, but refused to wed "the everyday man," instead choosing to wait until October 1860, when she was sixty-two years old, to marry widower John Allen Underwood (1798–1869). Underwood, who lived in England for a number of years, was an "eminent merchant of New York City" and traveled often.

Her husband died on January 7, 1869, in Yonkers, New York. Rosalba died at age 75 on November 15, 1874, in Bustleton, Philadelphia, in Pennsylvania. She was buried at Woodlands Cemetery in Philadelphia.
