= The Airs of Palestine =

1816 poem by John Pierpont

The Airs of Palestine is a poem by John Pierpont (1785–1866), first published in 1816 (Baltimore: B. Edes; various reprints). It is probably the most famous of his poems, and provided the title for his book Airs of Palestine and Other Poems (Boston: Munroe, 1840).

The poem was a huge success; sale of its copyright funded Pierpont's Harvard Divinity School education and inspired his closest friend and former business partner John Neal to experiment with writing as a means of funding his law education in Baltimore. He nevertheless gave it a bad review in his 1824–25 critical work, American Writers, saying: "It is tame, badly arranged, incomplete, and worse than all, afflicted with plagiarism, imitation, and alliteration." Neal and Pierpont ceased corresponding for a year afterward.
