= John Pierpont =

American poet, lawyer, and merchant (1785–1866)

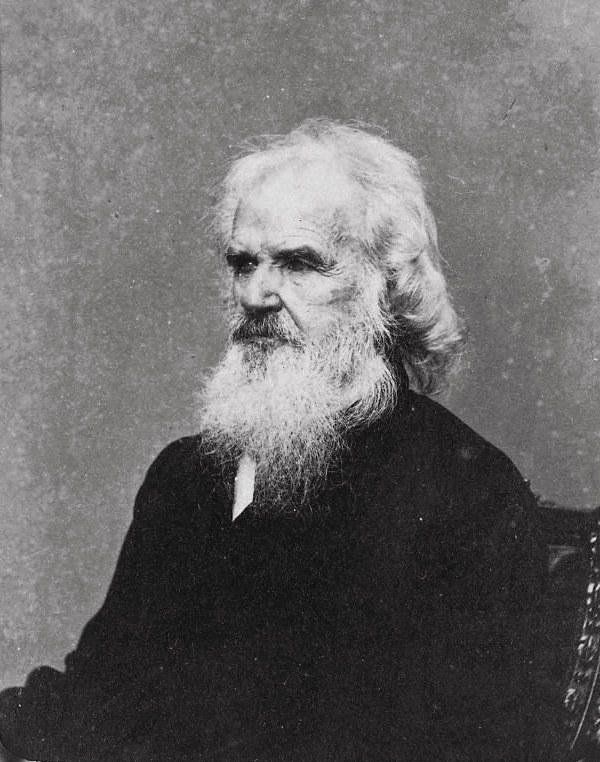
- Photograph of Pierpont by Mathew Brady

Personal details
- Born: John Pierpont; April 6, 1785 South Farms, Connecticut, U.S. (now part of Morris)
- Died: August 27, 1866 (aged 81) Medford, Massachusetts
- Spouses: Mary Sheldon Lord (m. 1810; died 1855) Harriet Campbell Fowler (m. 1857)
- Relations: John Pierpont Morgan (grandson)
- Children: 6, including James
- Parent(s): James Pierpont; Elizabeth Collins Pierpont
- Education: Yale College; Litchfield Law School
- Occupation: Attorney, merchant, minister, poet

Military service
- Branch/service: Union Army
- Years of service: 1861
- Rank: Chaplain
- Unit: 22nd Massachusetts Volunteer Infantry
- Battles/wars: American Civil War: Defenses of Washington

John Pierpont (April 6, 1785 – August 27, 1866) was an American poet, who was also successively a teacher, lawyer, merchant, and Unitarian minister. His poem The Airs of Palestine made him one of the best-known poets in the U.S. in his day. He was the maternal grandfather of J. P. Morgan.

== Early life ==
Born in 1785 in the South Farms section of Litchfield, Connecticut later incorporated as the town of Morris. He was the son of Elizabeth (née Collins) Pierpont and James Pierpont (1761–1840).

He graduated in 1804 from Yale College, and later from Litchfield Law School.

== Career ==
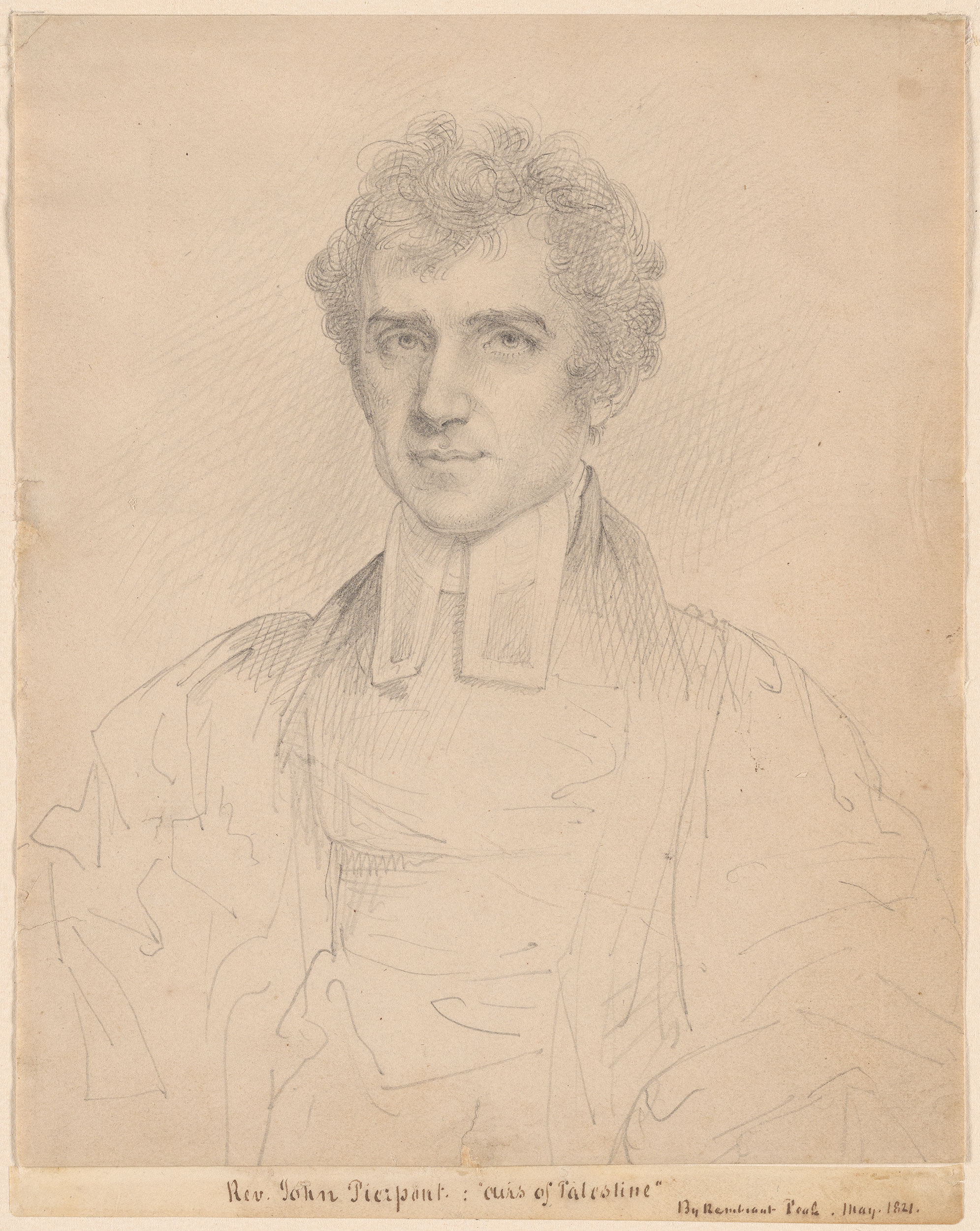
John Pierpont in 1821 by Rembrandt Peale

In 1814 he started a dry goods business with his brother in-law, Joseph Lord, and lifelong friend, John Neal. After a stint in debtor's prison as a result of the failure of the "Pierpont, Lord, and Neal" dry goods store chain in 1815, Pierpont sent his wife and children to live with her family in Connecticut, pawned the family silver, and isolated himself in Baltimore until he had produced The Airs of Palestine. This poem made him one of America's best-known poets in 1816, the same year he cofounded a literary society called the Delphian Club. Selling the poem's copyright paid for his move to Cambridge, Massachusetts. Neal gave the poem a poor review in his 1824–25 critical work American Writers and the two men stopped corresponding for a year afterward.

Pierpont began his religious work as a theology student in 1816, first in Baltimore and then at Harvard, afterwards accepting an appointment as pastor at the Hollis Street Church in Boston (1819-1845). During his tenure, Pierpont was instrumental in establishing Boston's English Classical School in 1821 and gained national recognition as an educator. He published two of the better-known early school readers in the United States, The American First Class Book (1823) and The National Reader (1827). However, Pierpont's latter years at the Hollis Street Church were characterized by controversy. His social activism for temperance and abolition angered some parishioners, and after a long public battle, he resigned in 1845.

After his resignation, Pierpont served as pastor of a Unitarian church in Troy, New York from 1845 to 1849, and then led the First Parish Church (Unitarian), Medford, Massachusetts from 1849 to 1856. He ran for Massachusetts governor during the 1840s as a Liberty Party candidate, and in 1850 as a Free Soil Party candidate for the U.S. House of Representatives.

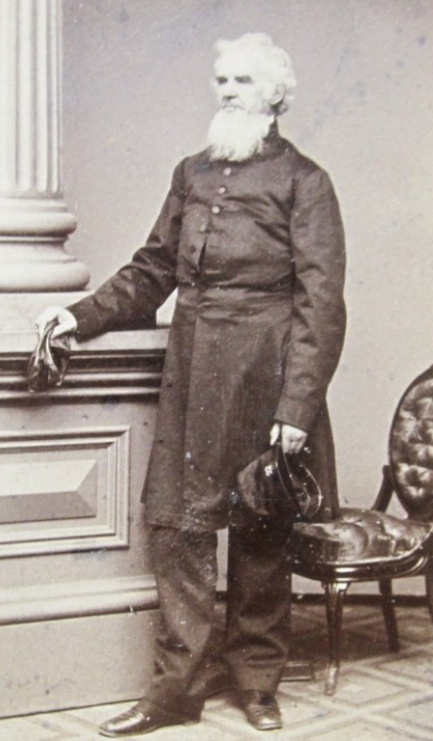
John Pierpont as Chaplain of the 22nd Massachusetts Infantry, 1861

On September 12, 1861, during the Civil War, 76-year-old Pierpont enlisted as the Chaplain of the 22nd Massachusetts Volunteer Infantry at Camp Schouler. He was commissioned on the staff of the regiment on October 8, and they moved by train to Washington. Pierpont and the 22nd Massachusetts served on duty at Hall's Hill, Virginia, as part of the Defenses of Washington. He resigned his commission on November 5, 1861 due to poor health, and was given an appointment in the Treasury Department in Washington, which he held from the end of 1861 until his death.

=== Literary works ===
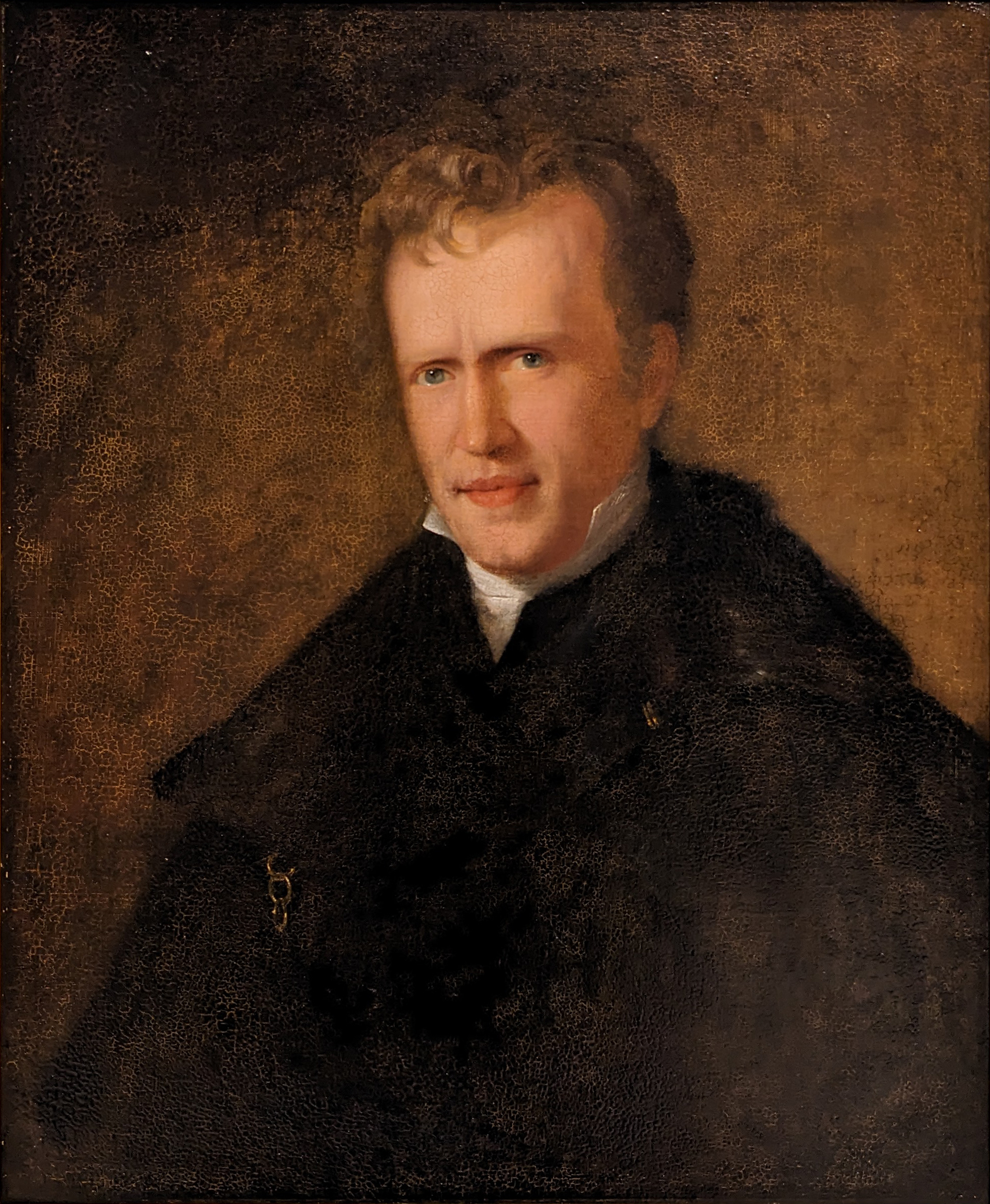
Pierpont's lifelong friend, John Neal

Pierpont gained a literary reputation with his book Airs of Palestine: A Poem (1816), re-published in an anthology by the same name in 1840. He also published moral literature, such as Cold Water Melodies and Washingtonian Songster (comp. 1842). In addition, he is probably the anonymous "gentleman" who co-authored The Drunkard; or, The Fallen Saved (1844), attributed to W. H. Smith, an actor and stage manager at Moses Kimball's Boston Museum (theatre). The Drunkard quickly became one of the most popular temperance plays in America.

Pierpont's many published sermons include, among others, The Burning of the Ephesian Letters (1833), Jesus Christ Not a Literal Sacrifice (1834), New Heavens and a New Earth (1837), Moral Rule of Political Action (1839), National Humiliation (1840), and A Discourse on the Covenant with Judas (1842). With publication of Phrenology and the Scriptures (1850), Pierpont became known not only as a reform lecturer, but also as an expert on phrenology and spiritualism.

Pierpont was an important influence on reform-minded antebellum poets. Along with John Greenleaf Whittier’s verse, Pierpont’s poems were frequently recited at public antislavery meetings. Oliver Johnson, a leading antislavery publisher and Garrison associate, published Pierpont’s Anti-Slavery Poems in 1843. The collection contains poems that had appeared mostly in the poetry columns of The Liberator and The National Anti-Slavery Standard. Pierpont’s writings were also anthologized widely in antislavery poetry collections, such as William Allen’s Autographs of Freedom (1853).

John Pierpont did not write the song "Jingle Bells" as erroneously claimed by Robert Fulghum in his collection of essays It Was on Fire When I Lay Down on It (1989). "Jingle Bells" was composed by his son James Lord Pierpont, who lived in Savannah, Georgia, and who was a Confederate soldier during the Civil War, composing songs for the Confederate States of America, including "Our Battle Flag", "Strike for the South", and "We Conquer or Die." He did, however, compose a hymn for the 250th anniversary of the incorporation of the town of Dedham, Massachusetts.

=== Activism ===
Pierpont may be called "the poet of the abolition movement". His poem "The Tocsin", written just after the destruction of Pennsylvania Hall (Philadelphia), was published in The Liberator, the country's leading anti-slavery paper.

Pierpont was also involved in women's rights issues and spoke about women's suffrage.

== Personal life ==
In 1810, Pierpont was married to Mary Sheldon Lord (1787–1855), a daughter of Mary (née Lyman) Lord and Lynde Lord. Together, they had six children, including:

- William Alston Pierpont (1811–1860), who married Mary Cecelia Ridgeway and Sara Turelle.
- Mary Elizabeth Pierpont (1812–1857), who died unmarried.
- Juliet Pierpont (1816–1884), who married Junius Spencer Morgan, and was the mother of financier John Pierpont Morgan.
- John Pierpont Jr. (1820–1879), who married Joanna LeBaron Sibley (1820–1852), a daughter of Jonas Leonard Sibley, in 1844.
- James Lord Pierpont (1822–1893), a songwriter who married Millicent Cowee in 1846. After her death, he married Eliza Jane Purse in 1857.
- Caroline Augusta Pierpont (1823–1881), who married merchant Joseph Moody Boardman.

After the death of his first wife in 1855, he remarried in 1857 to Harriet Louise (née Campbell) Fowler, the widow of George Warren Fowler and a daughter of Archibald Campbell.

He died at Medford, Massachusetts in 1866. Pierpont's sixteen-page obituary on the front page of the Atlantic Monthly was written by John Neal, his ex-business partner of fifty years earlier who later became an influential critic, writer, and lecturer, and who had named his second-oldest son (John Pierpont Neal) after Pierpont in 1847.
