= John Neal =

American writer and activist (1793–1876)

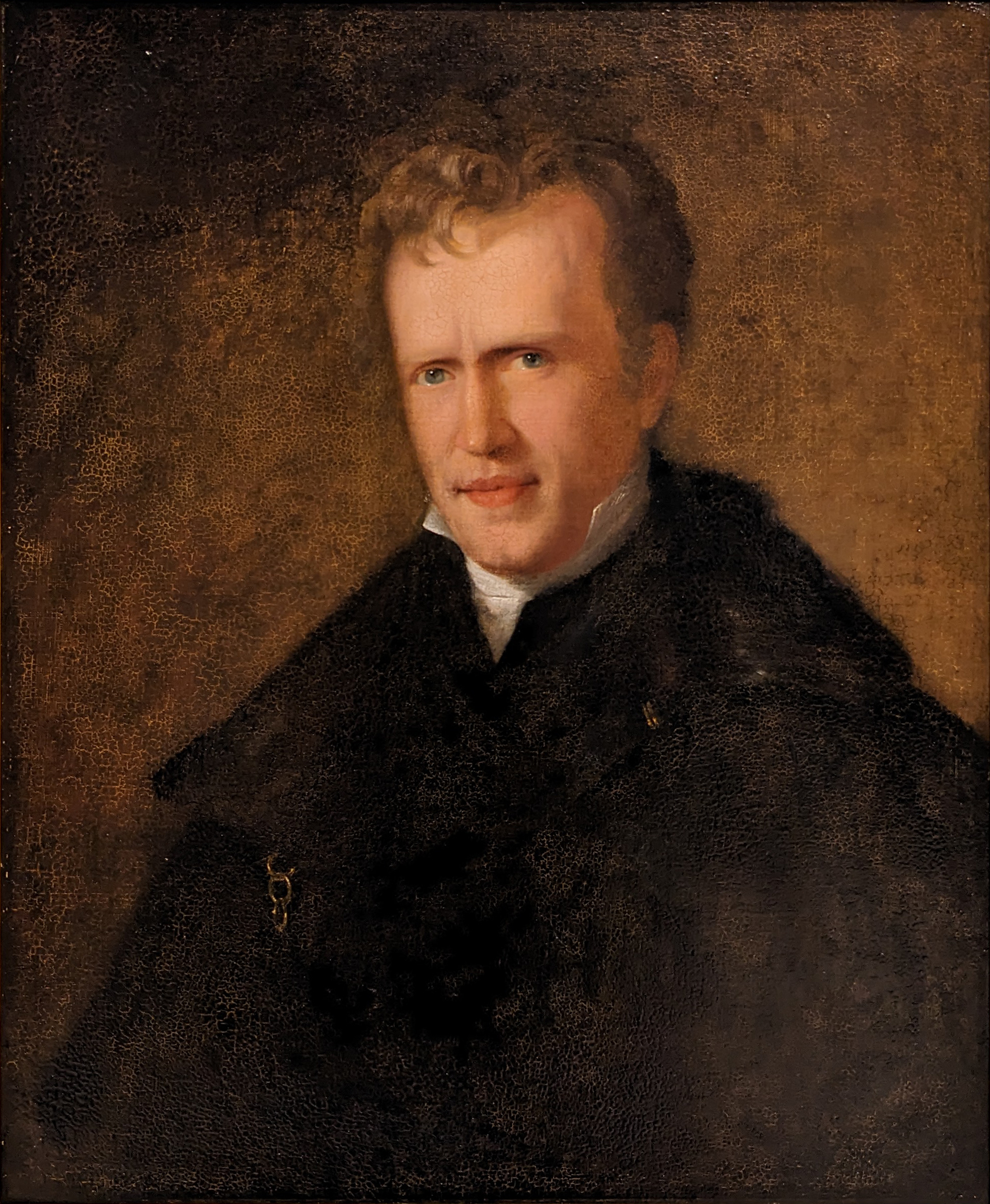
- c. 1823 portrait
- Born: August 25, 1793; Portland, District of Maine, US
- Died: June 20, 1876 (aged 82); Portland, Maine, US
- Resting place: Western Cemetery, Portland
- Occupations: Writer; critic; editor; activist; lawyer; lecturer; entrepreneur
- Spouse: Eleanor Hall (m. 1828)
- Children: 5
- Writing career
- Pen name: Somebody, M.D.C.; Jehu O'Cataract; John O'Cataract; Carter Holmes; A New Englander Over-Sea

Signature
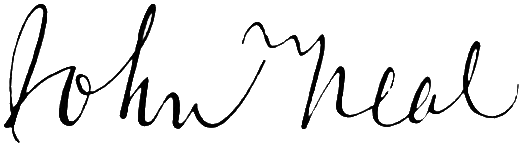

John Neal (August 25, 1793 – June 20, 1876) was an American writer, critic, editor, lecturer, and activist. Considered both eccentric and influential, he delivered speeches and published essays, novels, poems, and short stories between the 1810s and 1870s in the United States and Great Britain, championing American literary nationalism and regionalism in their earliest stages. Neal advanced the development of American art, fought for women's rights, advocated the end of slavery and racial prejudice, and helped establish the American gymnastics movement.

The first American author to use natural diction and a pioneer of colloquialism, Neal was the first to use the phrase son-of-a-bitch in a US work of fiction. He attained his greatest literary achievements between 1817 and 1835, during which time he was America's first daily newspaper columnist, the first American published in British literary journals, author of the first history of American literature, America's first art critic, a short story pioneer, a children's literature pioneer, and a forerunner of the American Renaissance. As one of the first men to advocate women's rights in the US and the first American lecturer on the issue, for over fifty years he supported female writers and organizers, affirmed intellectual equality between men and women, fought coverture laws against women's economic rights, and demanded suffrage, equal pay, and better education for women. He was the first American to establish a public gymnasium in the US and championed athletics to regulate violent tendencies with which he himself had struggled throughout his life.

A largely self-educated man who attended no schools after the age of twelve, Neal was a child laborer who left self-employment in dry goods at twenty-two to pursue dual careers in law and literature. By middle age, Neal had attained comfortable wealth and community standing in his native Portland, Maine, through varied business investments, arts patronage, and civic leadership.

Neal is considered an author without a masterpiece, though his short stories are his highest literary achievements and ranked with the best of his age. Rachel Dyer is considered his best novel, "Otter-Bag, the Oneida Chief" and "David Whicher" his best tales, and The Yankee his most influential periodical. His "Rights of Women" speech (1843) at the peak of his influence as a feminist had a considerable impact on the future of the movement.

== Biography ==
=== Childhood and early employment ===
John Neal and his twin sister Rachel were born in the town of Portland in the Massachusetts District of Maine on August 25, 1793, the only children of John and Rachel Hall Neal. The senior John Neal, a school teacher, died a month later. Neal's mother, described by former pupil Elizabeth Oakes Smith as a woman of "clear intellect, and no little self-reliance and independence of will", made up the lost family income by establishing her own school and renting rooms in her home to boarders. She also received assistance from the siblings' unmarried uncle, James Neal, and others in their Quaker community. Neal grew up in "genteel poverty", attending his mother's school, a Quaker boarding school, and the public school in Portland.

Neal claimed his lifelong struggle with a short temper and violent tendencies originated in the public school, at which he was bullied and physically abused by classmates and the schoolmaster. To reduce his mother's financial burden, Neal left school and home at the age of twelve for full-time employment.

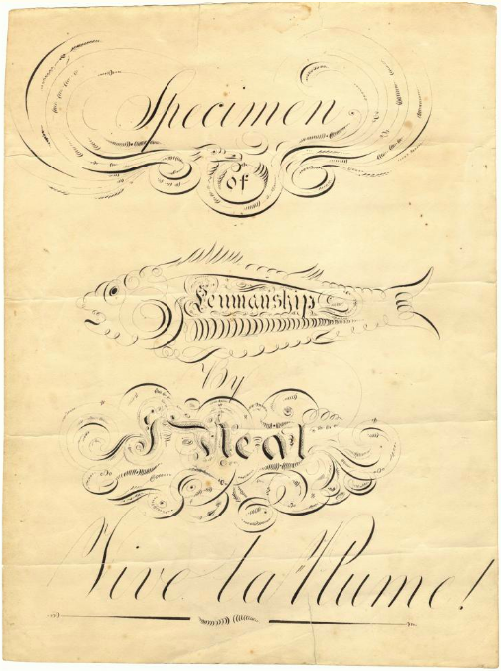
Penmanship business advertisement c. 1813

As an adolescent haberdasher and dry goods salesman in Portland and Portsmouth, Neal learned dishonest business practices like passing off counterfeit money (Note: Counterfeit money was very common in the United States in the early nineteenth century.) and misrepresenting merchandise quality and quantity. Laid off multiple times due to business failures resulting from the 1806 Non-importation Act against British imports, Neal traveled through Maine as an itinerant penmanship instructor, watercolor teacher, and miniature portrait artist. At twenty years of age in 1814, he answered an ad for employment with a dry goods shop in Boston and moved to the larger city.

In Boston, Neal established a partnership with John Pierpont and Pierpont's brother in-law, whereby they exploited supply chain constrictions caused by the War of 1812 to make quick profits smuggling contraband British dry goods between Boston, New York City, and Baltimore. They established stores in Boston, Baltimore, and Charleston before the recession following the war upended the firm and left Pierpont and Neal bankrupt in Baltimore in 1816. Though the "Pierpont, Lord, and Neal" wholesale/retail chain proved to be short-lived, Neal's relationship with Pierpont grew into the closest and longest-lived friendship of his life. (Note: In 1847, John Neal named his youngest child John Pierpont Neal in honor of his closest friend. In 1866 he wrote Pierpont's obituary.)

According to scholars Edward Watts and David J. Carlson, Neal's experience in business riding out the multiple booms and busts that eventually left him bankrupt at age twenty-two "cemented his sense of the central importance of relying on his own personal resources and talents".

=== Building a career in Baltimore ===
Neal's time in Baltimore between his business failure in 1816 and his departure for London in 1823 was the busiest period of his life as he juggled overlapping careers in editorship, journalism, poetry, novels, law study, and later, law practice. During this period he taught himself to read and write in eleven languages, (Note: Neal became fluent in French, but also became able to easily converse and write in Spanish, Italian, and German. In addition, he "could manage ... pretty well" writing and reading Portuguese, Swedish, Danish, Hebrew, Latin, Greek, and Old Saxon. He learned to read Chinese shortly before his death.) published seven books, read law for four years, completed an independent course of law study in eighteen months that was designed to be completed in seven-to-eight years, earned admission to the bar in a community known for rigorous requirements, and contributed prodigiously to newspapers and literary magazines, two of which he edited at different points.

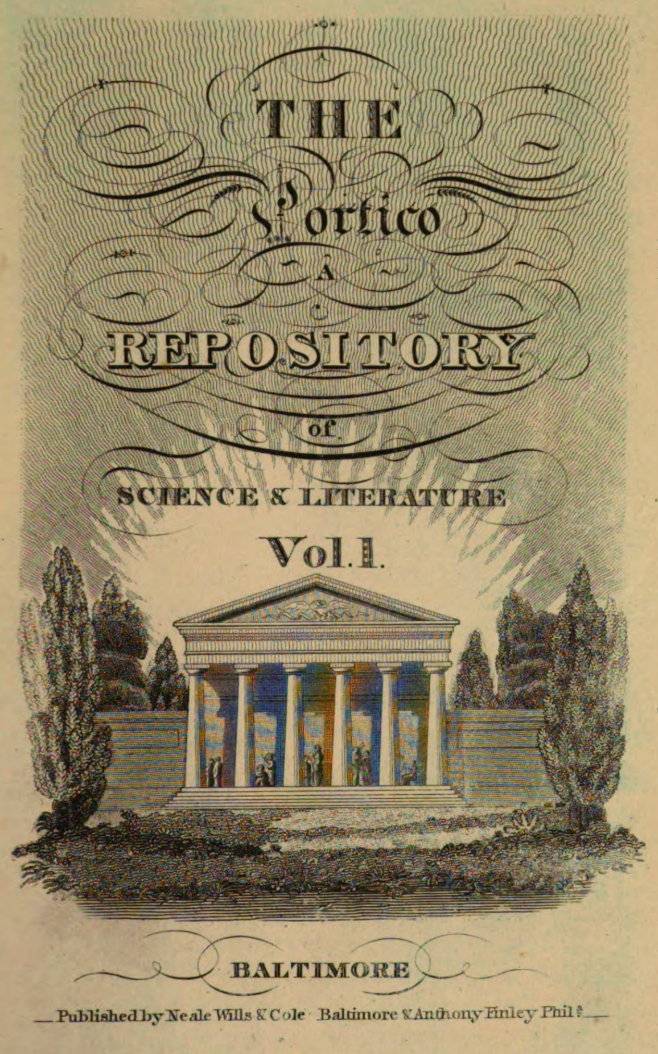
The Portico: A Repository of Science & Literature

Two months after Neal's bankruptcy trial, he submitted his first contribution to The Portico and quickly became the magazine's second-most prolific contributor of poems, essays, and literary criticism, though he was never paid. Two years later he took over as editor for what ended up being the last issue. The magazine was closely associated with the Delphian Club, which he founded in 1816 with Dr. Tobias Watkins, John Pierpont, and four other men. Neal felt indebted to this "high-minded, generous, unselfish" association of "intellectual and companionable" people for many of the happy memories and employment connections he enjoyed in Baltimore. While writing his earliest poetry, novels, and essays he was studying law as an unpaid apprentice in the office of William H. Winder, a fellow Delphian.

Neal's business failure had left him without enough "money to take a letter from the post-office", (Note: In 1816, recipients were responsible for paying postage on US Mail.) so Neal "cast about for something better to do ... and, after considering the matter for ten minutes or so, determined to try my hand at a novel." When he wrote his first book, fewer than seventy novels had been published by "not more than half a dozen [American] authors; and of these, only Washington Irving had received more than enough to pay for the salt in his porridge." Neal was nevertheless inspired by Pierpont's financial success with his poem The Airs of Palestine (1816) and encouraged by the reception of his initial submissions to The Portico. He resolved that "there was nothing left for me but authorship, or starvation, if I persisted in my plan of studying law".

Composing his first and only bound volume of poetry was Neal's nighttime distraction from laboring sixteen hours a day, seven days a week, for more than four months to produce an index for six years of weekly publications of Hezekiah Niles's Weekly Register magazine, which Niles admitted was "the most laborious work of the kind that ever appeared in any country".

In 1819, he published a play and took his first paying job as a newspaper editor, becoming the country's first daily columnist. The same year he wrote three-quarters of History of the American Revolution, otherwise credited to Paul Allen. Neal's substantial literary output earned him the moniker "Jehu O'Cataract" from his Delphian Club associates. By these means he was able to pay his expenses while completing his apprenticeship and independently studying law. He was admitted to the bar and started practicing law in Baltimore in 1820.

Neal's final years in Baltimore were his most productive as a novelist. He published one novel in 1822 and three more the following year, eventually rising to the status of James Fenimore Cooper's chief rival for recognition as America's leading novelist. In this turbulent period he quit the Delphian Club on bad terms and accepted excommunication from the Society of Friends after his participation in a street brawl. In reaction to insults against prominent lawyer William Pinkney published in Randolph just after Pinkney died, his son Edward Coote Pinkney challenged Neal to a duel. Having established himself six years earlier as an outspoken opponent of dueling, Neal refused and the two engaged in a battle of printed words in the fall of that year. Neal became "weary of the law—weary as death", feeling that he spent those years in "open war, with the whole tribe of lawyers in America". "Ironically, ... at precisely the moment when [Neal] was endeavoring to establish himself as the American writer, Neal was also alienating friends, critics, and the general public at an alarming rate."

By late 1823, Neal was ready to relocate away from Baltimore. According to him, the catalyst to move to London was a dinner party with an English friend who quoted Sydney Smith's 1820 then-notorious remark, "in the four quarters of the globe, who reads an American book?". Whether it had more to do with Smith or Pinkney, Neal took less than a month after that dinner date to settle his affairs in Baltimore and secure passage on a ship bound for the UK on December 15, 1823.

=== Writing in London ===
Neal's relocation to London figured into three professional goals that guided him through the 1820s: to supplant Washington Irving and James Fenimore Cooper as the leading American literary voice, to bring about a new distinctly American literary style, and to reverse the British literary establishment's disdain for American writers. He followed Irving's precedent of using temporary residence in London to earn more money and notoriety from the British literary market. London publishers had already pirated Seventy-Six and Logan, but Neal hoped those companies would pay him to publish Errata and Randolph if he were present to negotiate. They refused.

Neal brought enough money to survive for only a few months on the assumption that "if people gave any thing [sic] for books here, they would not be able to starve me, since I could live upon air, and write faster than any man that ever lived." His financial situation had become desperate when William Blackwood asked Neal in April 1824 to become a regular contributor to Blackwood's Magazine. For the next year and a half, Neal was "handsomely paid" to be one of the magazine's most prolific contributors.

His first Blackwood's article, a profile on the 1824 candidates for US president and the five presidents who had served to that point, was the first article by an American to appear in a British literary journal and was quoted and republished widely throughout Europe. As the first written history of American literature, the American Writers series was Neal's most noteworthy contribution to the magazine. Blackwood provided the platform for Neal's earliest written works on gender and women's rights and published Brother Jonathan, (Note: The name Brother Jonathan also refers to a personification of New England popular at the time of Neal's Brother Jonathan novel.) but a back-and-forth over manuscript revisions in autumn 1825 soured the relationship and Neal was once again without a source of income.

After a short time earning much less money writing articles for other British periodicals, thirty-two year-old John Neal met seventy-seven year-old utilitarian philosopher Jeremy Bentham through the London Debating Societies. In late 1825 Bentham offered him rooms at his "Hermitage" and a position as his personal secretary. Neal spent the next year and a half writing for Bentham's Westminster Review.

In spring 1827, Bentham financed Neal's return to the US. He left the UK having caught the attention of the British literary elite, published the novel he brought with him, and "succeeded to perfection" in educating the British about American institutions, habits, and prospects. Yet Brother Jonathan was not received as the great American novel and it failed to earn Neal the level of international fame he had hoped for, so he returned to the US no longer Cooper's chief rival.

=== Return to Portland, Maine ===
Neal returned to the United States from Europe in June 1827 with plans to settle in New York City, but stopped first in his native Portland to visit his mother and sister. There he was confronted by citizens offended by his derision of prominent citizens in the semi-autobiographical Errata, the way he depicted New England dialect and habits in Brother Jonathan, and his criticism of American writers in Blackwood's Magazine. Residents posted broadsides, engaged in verbally and physically violent exchanges with Neal in the streets, and conspired to block his admission to the bar. Neal defiantly resolved to settle in Portland instead of New York. "'Verily, verily,' said I, 'if they take that position, here I will stay, till I am both rooted and grounded—grounded in the graveyard, if nowhere else.'"

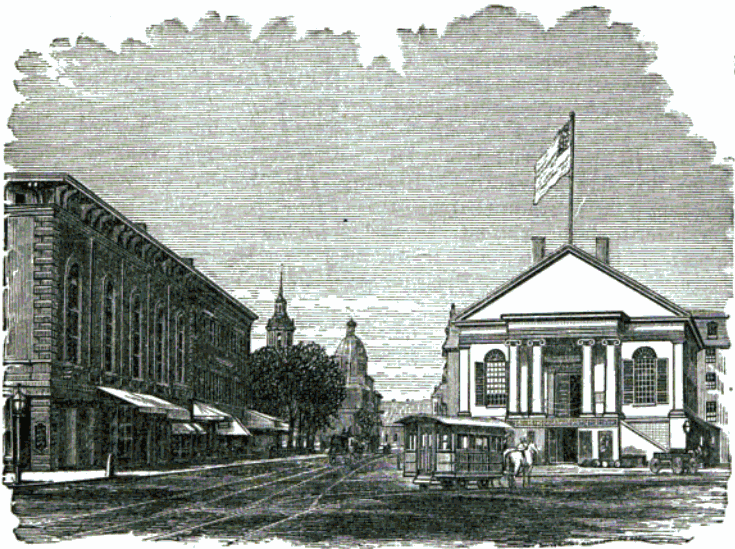
Portland's Market House in Market Square, site of John Neal's first gymnasium

Neal became a proponent in the US of athletics he had practiced abroad, including Friedrich Jahn's early Turnen gymnastics and boxing and fencing techniques he learned in Paris, London, and Baltimore. He opened Maine's first gymnasium in 1827, making him the first American to establish a public gym in the US. (Note: All the public gymnasiums in the US that precede Neal's were established by Germans and none of the gyms established in the US by Americans that precede Neal's were open to the general public: one public gym in Boston founded by German Charles Follen in early 1827 and multiple school and college gymnasiums in the northeastern states founded by Germans and Americans in 1826 and 1827.) He offered lessons in boxing and fencing in his law office. The same year he started gyms in nearby Saco and at Bowdoin College. The year before he had published articles on German gymnastics in the American Journal of Education and urged Thomas Jefferson to include a gymnastics school at the University of Virginia. Neal's athletic pursuits modeled "a new sense of maleness" that favored "forbearance based on strength" and helped him regulate the violent tendencies with which he struggled throughout his life.

In 1828, Neal established The Yankee magazine with himself as editor, and continued publication through the end of 1829. He used its pages to vindicate himself to fellow Portlanders, critique American art and drama, host a discourse on the nature of New Englander identity, advance his developing feminist ideas, and encourage new literary voices, most of them women. Neal also edited many other periodicals between the late 1820s and the mid 1840s and was during this time a highly sought-after contributor on a variety of topics.

Neal published three novels from material he produced in London and focused his new creative writing efforts on a body of short stories that represents his greatest literary achievement. Neal published an average of one tale per year between 1828 and 1846, helping to shape the relatively new short story genre. He began traveling as a lecturer in 1829, reaching the height of his influence in the women's rights movement in 1843 when he was delivering speeches before large crowds in New York City and reaching wider audiences through the press. This period of juggling literary, activist, athletic, legal, artistic, social, and business pursuits was captured by Neal's law apprentice James Brooks in 1833:

Neal was ... a boxing-master, and fencing-master too, and as a printer's devil came in, crying "copy, more copy," he would race with a huge swan's quill, full gallop, over sheets of paper as with a steam-pen, and off went one page, and off went another, and then a lesson in boxing, the thump of glove to glove, then the mask, and the stamp of the sandal, and the ringing of the foils.

=== Family and civic leadership ===
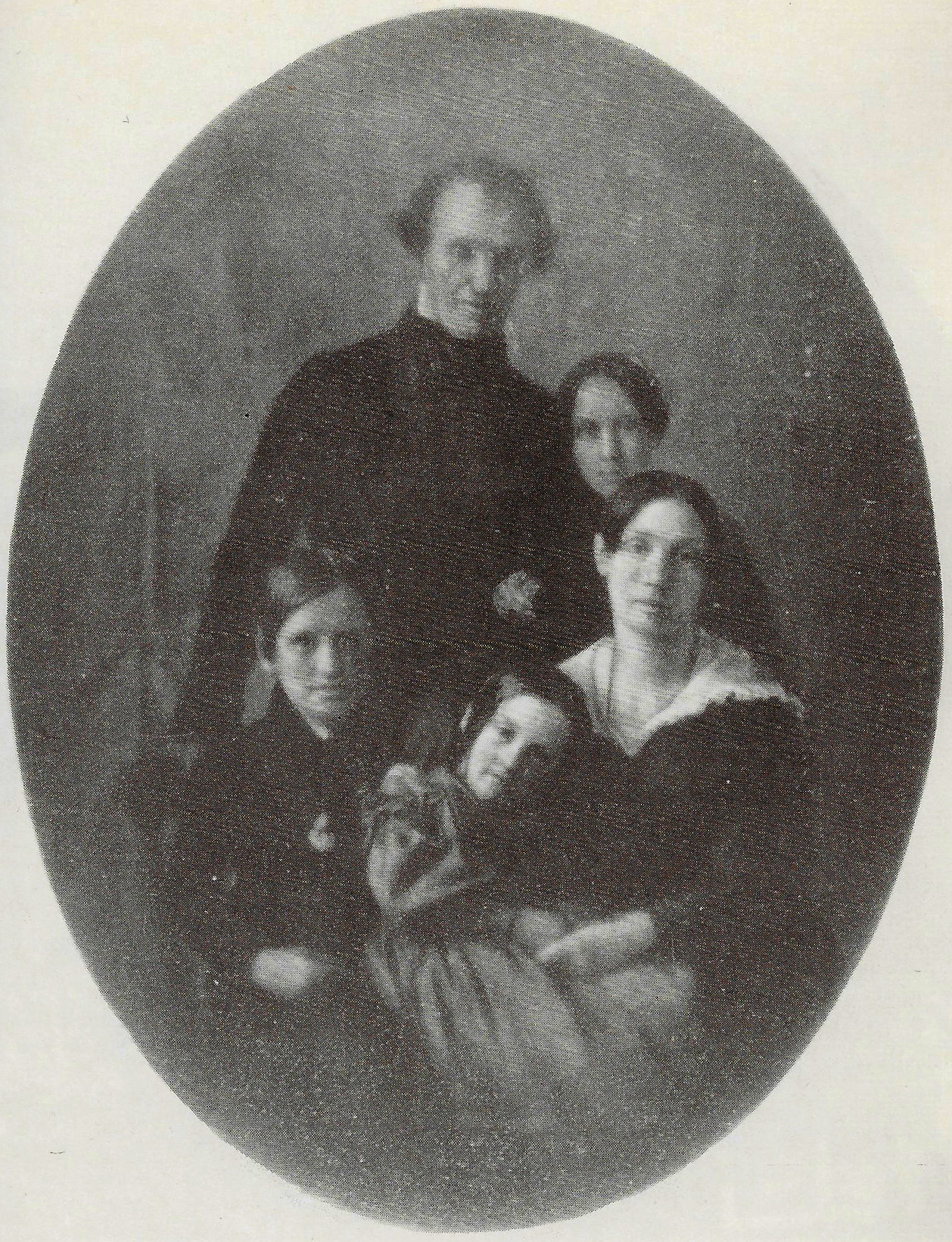
Daguerreotype of the Neal family, 1843 (Note: Clockwise from top: John Neal, daughter Mary Neal, wife Eleanor Hall Neal, daughter Margaret Eleanor Neal, and son James Neal)

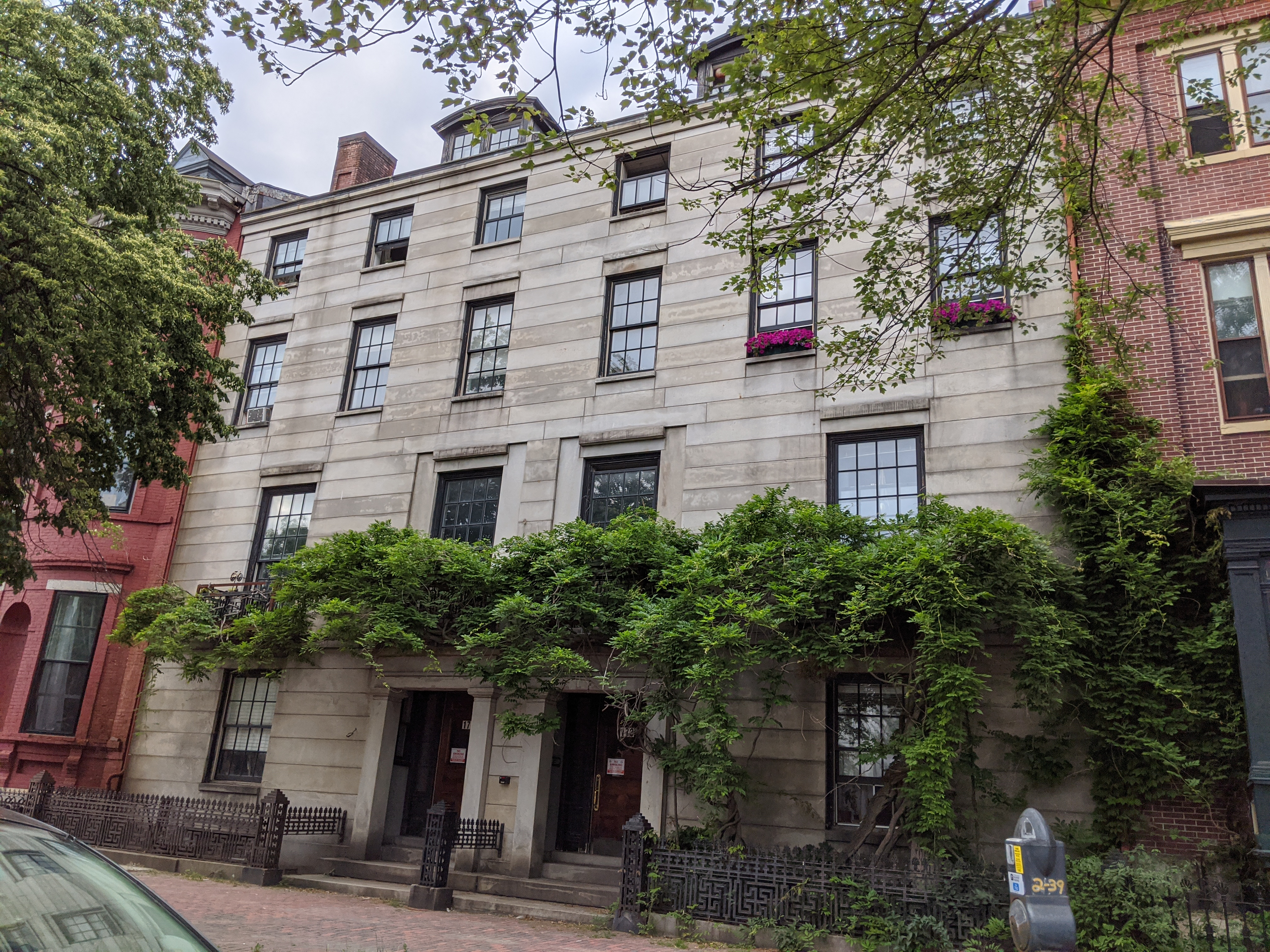
John Neal houses at 173–175 State Street, Portland, Maine (Note: John Neal built two mirror-image row houses, moving into number 173 (right) and selling 175 (left). In 1970 they were listed as contributing buildings in the Spring Street Historic District.)

In 1828, Neal married his second cousin Eleanor Hall and together they had five children between 1829 and 1847. The couple raised their children in the house he built on Portland's prestigious State Street in 1836. Also in 1836 he received an honorary master's degree from Bowdoin College, the same institution at which Neal made a living as a self-employed teenage penmanship instructor and that later educated the more economically privileged Nathaniel Hawthorne and Henry Wadsworth Longfellow.

After the 1830s, Neal became less active in literary circles and increasingly occupied with business, activism, and local arts and civic projects, particularly after receiving inheritances from two paternal uncles that dramatically reduced his need to rely on writing as a source of income. James Neal died in 1832 and Stephen Neal in 1836, but the second inheritance was held up until 1858 in a legal battle involving Stephen's daughter, suffragist Lydia Neal Dennett. In 1845 he became the Mutual Benefit Life Insurance Company's first agent in Maine, earning enough in commissions that he decided to retire from the lecture circuit, law practice, and most writing projects. Neal began developing and managing local real estate, operating multiple granite quarries, developing railroad connections to Portland, and investing in land speculation in Cairo, Illinois. He led the movement to incorporate Portland as a city and build the community's first parks and sidewalks. He became interested in architecture, interior design, and furniture design, developing pioneering, simple, and functional solutions that influenced other designers outside his local area.

Many of his literary contemporaries interpreted Neal's change in focus as a disappearance. Hawthorne wrote in 1845 of "that wild fellow, John Neal", who "surely has long been dead, else he never could keep himself so quiet." James Russell Lowell in 1848 claimed he had "wasted in Maine the sinews and cords of his pugilist brain". Friend and fellow Portland native Henry Wadsworth Longfellow described Neal in 1860 as "a good deal tempered down but fire enough still".

After years of vaguely affiliating with Unitarianism and universalism, Neal converted to Congregationalism in 1851. Through deepened religiosity he found new moral arguments for women's rights, potential release from his violent tendencies, and inspiration for seven religious essays. Neal collected these "exhortations" in One Word More (1854), which "rambles passionately for two hundred pages and closes with breathless metaphor" in an effort to convert "the reasoning and thoughtful among believers".

At the urging of Longfellow and other friends, John Neal returned to novel writing late in life, publishing True Womanhood in 1859. To fill a gap in his income between 1863 and 1866 he wrote three dime novels. In 1869 he published his "most readable book, and certainly one of the most entertaining autobiographies to come out of nineteenth-century America". Reflecting on his life this way inspired Neal to amplify his activism and assume regional leadership roles in the women's suffrage movement. His last two books are a collection of pieces for and about children titled Great Mysteries and Little Plagues (1870), and a guidebook for his hometown titled Portland Illustrated (1874).

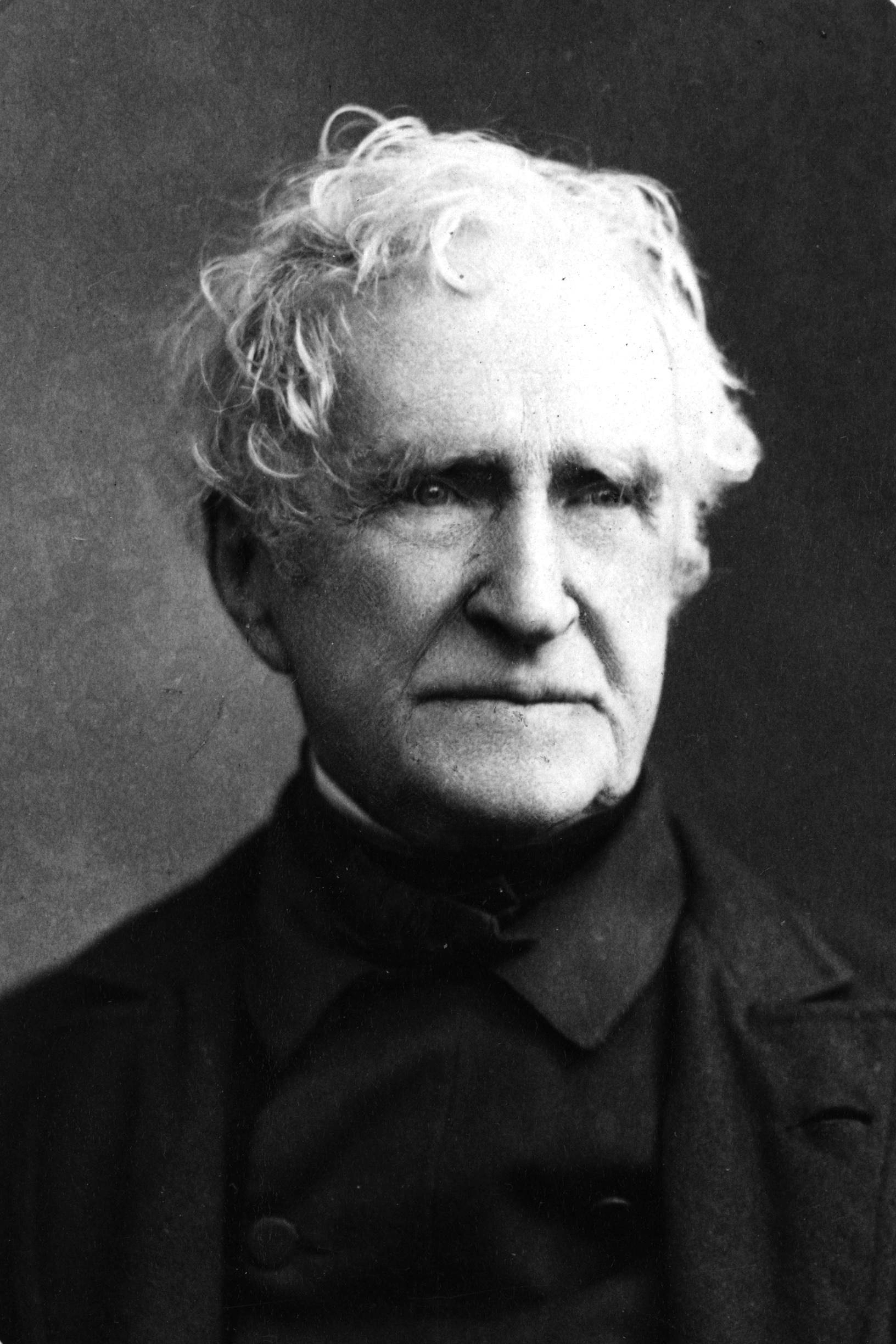
Neal c. 1870

By 1870, in his old age, he had amassed a comfortable fortune, valued at $80,000. (Note: $80,000 in 1870 was approximately equal to between fifty and seventy years' wages for industrial management workers at the time and is approximately equivalent to $2,036,842 in 2025.) His last appearance in the public eye was likely an 1875 syndicated article from the Portland Advertiser about an eighty-one year-old Neal physically overpowering a man in his early twenties who was smoking on a non-smoking streetcar. John Neal died on June 20, 1876, and was buried in the Neal family plot in Portland's Western Cemetery.

== Writing ==
Neal's body of literary work spans almost sixty years from the end of the War of 1812 to a decade following the Civil War, though he achieved his major literary accomplishments between 1817 and 1835. His writing both reflects and challenges shifting American ways of life over those years. He started his career as an American reading public was just beginning to emerge, working immediately and consistently within the nation's developing "complex web of print culture". Throughout his adult life, especially in the 1830s, Neal was a prolific contributor to newspapers and magazines, writing essays on a wide variety of topics including but not limited to art criticism, literary criticism, phrenology, women's rights, early German gymnastics, and slavery.

His efforts to subvert the influence of the British literary elite and to develop a rival American literature were largely credited to his successors until more recent twenty-first century scholarship shifted that credit to Neal. His short stories are "his highest literary achievement" and are ranked with those of Nathaniel Hawthorne, Edgar Allan Poe, Herman Melville, and Rudyard Kipling. John Neal is often considered an influential American literary figure with no masterpiece of his own.

=== Style ===
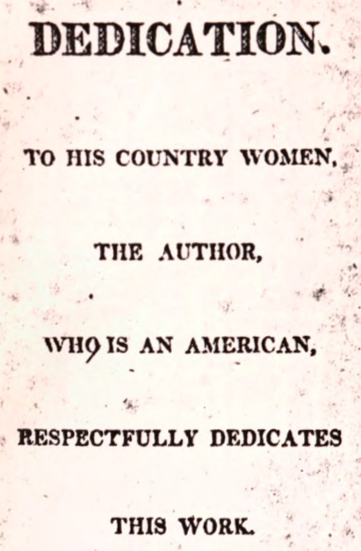
Dedication to John Neal's first novel in 1817

Defying the rigid moralism and sentimentality of his American contemporaries Washington Irving and James Fenimore Cooper, Neal's early novels between the late 1810s and 1820s depict dark, physically-flawed, conflicted Byronesque heroes of great intellect and morals. His brand of Romanticism reflected an aversion for self-criticism and revision, relying instead on "nearly automatic writing" to define his style, enhance the commercial viability of his works, and craft a new American literature. As a pioneer of "talk[ing] on paper" or "natural writing", Neal was "the first in America to be natural in his diction" and his work represents "the first deviation from ... Irvingesque graciousness" in which "not only characters but also genres converse, and are interrogated, challenged, and transformed." Neal declared that he "never shall write what is now worshipped under the name of classical English", which was "the deadest language I ever met with or heard of".

Neal's voice was one of many following the War of 1812 calling for an American literary nationalism, but Neal felt his colleagues' work relied too much on British conventions. By contrast, he felt that "to succeed ..., I must be unlike all that have gone before me" and issue "another Declaration of Independence, in the great Republic of Letters." To achieve this he exploited distinctly American characters, settings, historical events, and manners of speech in his writing. This was a "caustic assault" on British literary elites viewed as aristocrats writing for personal amusement, in contrast to American authors as middle class professionals plying a commercial trade for sustenance. By mimicking the common and sometimes profane language of his countrymen in fiction, Neal hoped to appeal to a broader readership of minimally educated book buyers, thereby intending to guarantee the existence of an American national literature by ensuring its economic viability.

Starting in the late 1820s, Neal shifted his focus from nationalism to regionalism to challenge the rise of Jacksonianism in the US by showcasing and contrasting coexisting regional and multicultural differences within the United States. The collection of essays and stories he published in his magazine The Yankee "lays the groundwork for reading the nation itself as a collection of voices in conversation" and "asks readers to decide for themselves how to manage the multiple and contending sides of a federal union." To preserve variations in American English he feared might disappear in an increasingly nationalist climate, he became one of the first writers to employ colloquialism and regional dialects in his writing.

=== Literary criticism ===
Neal used literary criticism in magazines and novels to encourage desired changes in the field and to uplift new writers, most of them women. Noted for his "critical vision", Neal expressed judgments that were widely accepted in his lifetime. "My opinion of other [people's] writings", he said, "has never been ill received; and in every case ... my judgment has been confirmed, sooner or later, without a single exception." Fred Lewis Pattee corroborated this statement seventy years after Neal's death: "Where he condemned, time has almost without exception condemned also."

As an American literary nationalist, he called for "faithful representations of native character" in literature that utilize the "abundant and hidden sources of fertility ... in the northern, as well as the southern Americas". His American Writers essay series in Blackwood's Magazine (1824) is the earliest written history of American literature, and was reprinted as a collection in 1937. Neal dismissed almost all of the 120 authors he critiqued in that series as derivative of their British predecessors.

September 1829 issue of The Yankee, containing Neal's first critique of Edgar Allan Poe's work

John Neal used his role as critic, particularly in the pages of his magazine The Yankee, to draw attention to newer writers in whose work he saw promise. John Greenleaf Whittier, Edgar Allan Poe, Nathaniel Hawthorne, and Henry Wadsworth Longfellow all received their first "substantial sponsorship or praise" in the magazine's pages. When submitting poetry to Neal for review, Whittier made the request, "if you don't like it, say so privately; and I will quit poetry, and everything also of a literary nature".

Poe was Neal's most historically impactful discovery and when he quit poetry for short stories it was likely due to Neal's influence. Poe thanked Neal for "the very first words of encouragement I ever remember to have heard". After Poe's death two decades later, Neal defended his legacy against attacks in Rufus Wilmot Griswold's unsympathetic obituary of Poe, labeling Griswold "a Rhadamanthus, who is not to be bilked of his fee, a thimble-full of newspaper notoriety".

=== Short stories ===
Called "the inventor of the American short story", Neal's tales are "his highest literary achievement". He published an average of one per year between 1828 and 1846, helping to shape the relatively new short story genre, particularly early children's literature.

Considered his best short stories, "Otter-Bag, the Oneida Chief" (1829) and "David Whicher" (1832) "overshadow the less inspired efforts of his more famous contemporaries and add a dimension to the art of storytelling not to be found in Irving and Poe, rarely in Hawthorne, and rarely in American fiction until Melville and Twain decades later (and Faulkner a century later) began telling their tales." Ironically, "David Whicher" was published anonymously and not attributed to Neal until the 1960s. "The Haunted Man" (1832) is noteworthy as the first work of fiction to utilize psychotherapy. "The Old Pussy-Cat and the Two Little Pussy-Cats" and "The Life and Adventures of Tom Pop" (1835) are both considered pioneering works of children's literature.

Like his magazine essays and lectures, Neal's stories challenged American socio-political phenomena that grew in the period leading up to and including Andrew Jackson's terms as US president (1829–1837): manifest destiny, empire building, Indian removal, consolidation of federal power, racialized citizenship, and the Cult of Domesticity. "David Whicher" challenged a body of popular literature that converged in the 1820s around a "divisive and destructive insistence on frontiersman and the Indian as implacable enemies". "Idiosyncrasies" is a "manifesto for human rights" in the face of "hegemonic patriarchalism". His stories in this period also used humor and satire to address social and political phenomena, most notably "Courtship" (1829), "The Utilitarian" (1830), "The Young Phrenologist" (1836), "Animal Magnetism" (1839), and "The Ins and the Outs" (1841).

=== Novels ===
With the exception of True Womanhood (1859), John Neal published all of his novels between 1817 and 1833. The first five he wrote and published in Baltimore: Keep Cool (1817), Logan (1822), Seventy-Six (1823), Randolph (1823), and Errata (1823). He wrote Brother Jonathan in Baltimore, but revised and published it in London in 1825. He published Rachel Dyer (1828), Authorship (1830), and The Down-Easters (1833) while living in Portland, Maine, but all are reworkings of content he wrote in London.

Keep Cool, Neal's first novel, made him "the first in America to be natural in his diction" and the "father of American subversive fiction". Generally regarded as a failure, the book shows that "the gulf between Neal's prophetic vision of a native literature and his own capacity to fulfill that vision is painfully apparent". The productivity of Neal's Baltimore days is "hard to believe—until one reads the novels" and notices the haste with which they were written.

Logan, a Family History is a "gothic tapestry" of "superstition, supernatural suggestions, brutality, sensuality, colossal hatred, delirium, rape, insanity, murder ... incest and cannibalism". By "elevating emotional effect over coherence, the novel excites its readers to death." It challenged the national narrative of American Indians' foreordained disappearance in the face of White Americans' territorial expansion and collapsed racial boundaries between the two groups.

"It was there," said he, "there exactly where that horse is passing now, that they first fired upon me. I set off at a speed up that hill, but, finding nine of the party there, I determined to dash over that elevation in front; I attempted it, but shot after shot was fired after me, until I preferred making one desperate attempt, sword in hand, to being shot down, like a fat goose, upon a broken gallop. I wheeled, made a dead set at the son-of-a-bitch in my rear, unhorsed him, and actually broke through the line."

— John Neal, Seventy-Six, 1823

Seventy-Six was Neal's favorite of his novels. When it was released in 1823, Neal was at the height of his prominence as a novelist, being at the time the chief rival of leading American author, James Fenimore Cooper. Inspired by Cooper's The Spy, Neal based his story on historical research compiled a few years earlier while helping his friend Paul Allen write his History of the American Revolution. Seventy-Six was criticized at the time for its use of profanity and was recognized later as the first work of American fiction to use the phrase son-of-a-bitch.

Brother Jonathan: or, the New Englanders was the most "complex, ambitious, and demanding" American novel until Cooper's Littlepage Manuscripts trilogy twenty years later. As "one of the most emphatic, even shrill examples of U.S. nationalistic literature", it is "positively bristling with regional accents, from the New England twang of its protagonists through to bursts of patois in Virginian, Georgian, Scottish, Penobscot Indian, and Ebonics". Running counter to Neal's purported nationalist theme, "the diverse linguistic styles" used in the novel "subvert the fiction of a unified, national whole" in the US. The novel's "greatest achievement [is] its faithful if irreverent representation of American customs and American speech" that nevertheless "was read by American reviewers as outright slander" against the US and "aroused a terrible storm ... in Portland [where] he was denounced with great indignation."

Rachel Dyer: a North American Story (1828) is widely considered to be John Neal's most successful novel, most readable for a modern audience, and most successful at manifesting his desire for a national American literature. Along with Brother Jonathan and The Down-Easters, it is notable for depicting peculiar American folkways, accents, and slang. One hundred years later it provided source material for the Dictionary of American English. A historical fiction like many of Neal's other novels, it is the first hardcover novel based on the Salem witch trials and influenced John Greenleaf Whittier and Nathaniel Hawthorne to include witchcraft in their creative writing.

=== Art criticism and patronage ===
Neal was the first American art critic, though he did not receive this recognition until the twentieth century. Scholar William David Barry argued that Neal's impact in this field may be superior to his role in fiction. Starting in 1819 with articles in Baltimore newspapers, Neal expanded to a much wider audience with Randolph (1823), which communicated his opinions through the thin veil of the novel's protagonist. Though he continued work in this field at least as late 1869, his chief impact was in the 1820s. Neal around this time regularly visited Rembrandt Peale's Peale Museum, courted his daughter Rosalba Carriera Peale, and sat for portraits with his niece Sarah Miriam Peale.

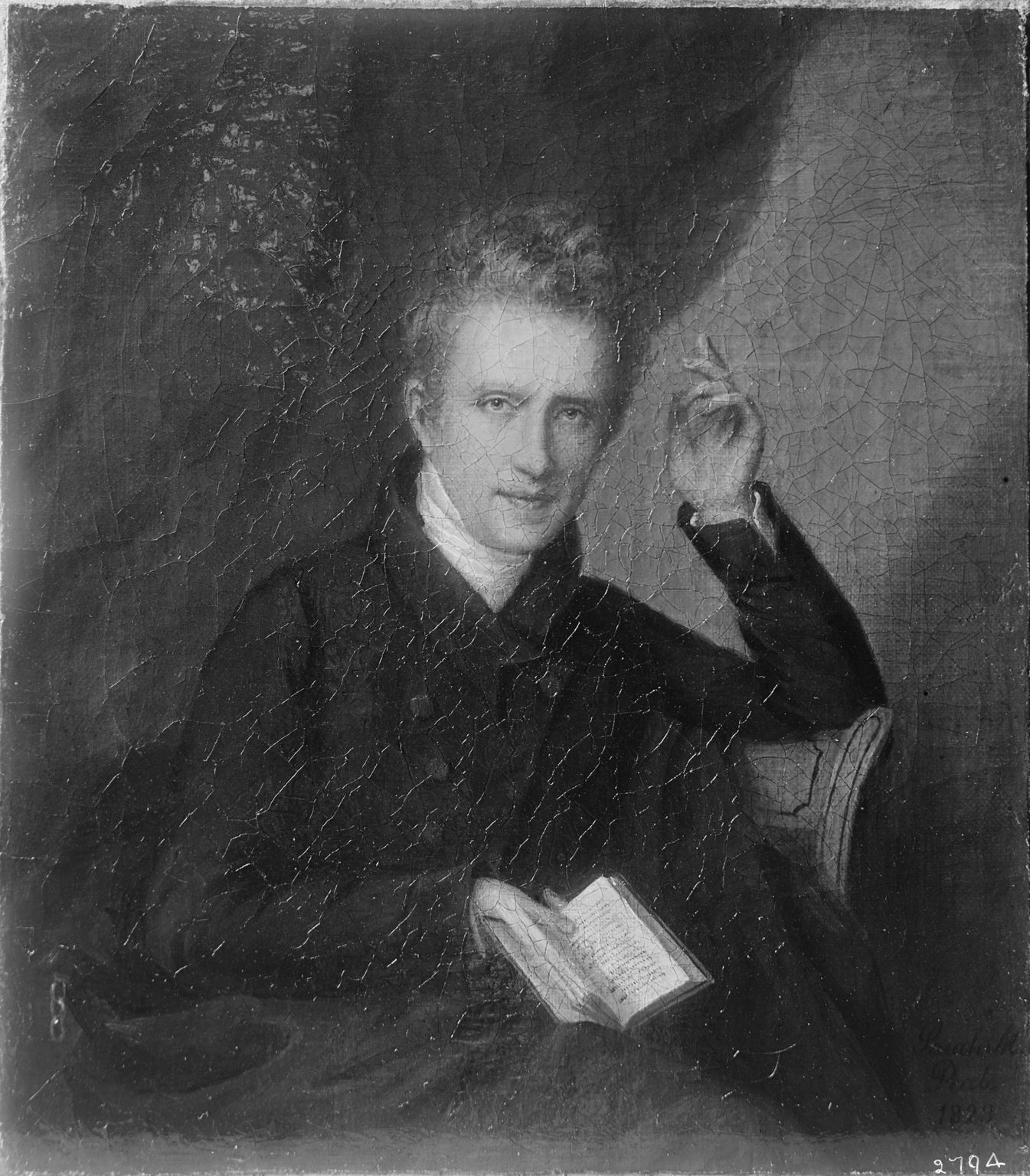
Neal in 1823 by Sarah Miriam Peale

Neal's approach to art criticism in the early 1820s was intuitive and showed disdain for connoisseurship, which he viewed as aristocratic and incompatible with American democratic ideals. Neal shows some initial influence from August Wilhelm Schlegel's Course of Lectures in Dramatic Art and Literature and Sir Joshua Reynolds's Discourses, but largely broke with those sensibilities over the course of the decade. By the late 1820s he came to dismiss history painting and show preference for "the unadulterated truth of the American locality and nature" he found in portraits and landscapes, anticipating the rise of the Hudson River School. The positive attention Neal paid to American portrait painters trained in the "humbler contingencies" of sign painting and applied arts was accompanied by his acknowledgment of the artist's often conflicting priorities: preserving likeness of the subject without offending the customer. Neal was also unique in his effort in this period to raise the status of engraving as fine art, paying particular attention to engraved paintings published in The Token and The Atlantic Souvenir annual gift books.

Reynolds's approach to art criticism would remain dominant in both the US and UK until John Ruskin's Modern Painters was published in 1843, though Neal's "Landscape and Portrait-Painting" (1829) anticipated many of those Ruskinesque changes by distinguishing between "things seen by the artist" and "things as they are".

After Neal had accumulated sufficient wealth and influence toward the middle of the nineteenth century, he began patronizing and uplifting artists in the Portland, Maine area. Painter Charles Codman and sculptor Benjamin Paul Akers both became steadily patronized as a result of Neal's encouragement, patronage, and connections. Neal also helped guide the work and careers of Franklin Simmons, John Rollin Tilton, and Harrison Bird Brown. Brown became Portland's most successful artist of the nineteenth century.

Comparatively constant is Neal's taste for bold, unlabored approaches to painting that utilize "an offhand, free, sketchy style, without high finish". The same could be said of Neal's "fantastic mixture of common sense and absurdity, of intelligent observation and dross" that portrays Neal the art critic as "melodramatic, addicted to exaggeration, superficial, inconsistent, ill-informed, naive". These descriptors apply less to his final essays on art (1868 and 1869) that conspicuously lack the qualities of Neal's boastful, confident, and passionate style in the 1820s. His opinions from that earlier period "to a remarkable degree ... have stood the trying test of time."

=== Poetry ===
The bulk of Neal's poetry was published in The Portico while studying law in Baltimore. His only bound collection of poems is Battle of Niagara, A Poem, without Notes; and Goldau, or the Maniac Harper, published in 1818. Though Battle of Niagara brought him little fame or money, it is considered the best poetic description of Niagara Falls up to that time. Poems by Neal are also featured in Specimens of American Poetry edited by Samuel Kettell (1829), The Poets and Poetry of America edited by Rufus Wilmot Griswold (1850), and American Poetry from the Beginning to Whitman edited by Louis Untermeyer (1931). Griswold considered Neal one of the best poets of his age.

=== Drama and theatrical criticism ===
Neal authored two plays, neither of which were ever produced on stage: Otho: A Tragedy, in Five Acts (1819) and Our Ephraim, or The New Englanders, A What-d'ye-call-it?—in three Acts (1835).

Neal wrote Otho hoping it would see production with Thomas Abthorpe Cooper in the lead, but Cooper showed no interest. The play was written in verse and heavily inspired by the works of Lord Byron; John Pierpont considered it too dense and wrote to Neal that it needed "a sky-light or two" cut into it. It was also described as "at once both mystifying and trite". Neal brought the script with him to London with plans to revise it and have it produced for the stage while he was there, but he never achieved that goal.

"Not knowin', can't say."

— John Neal, Our Ephraim, 1834

Our Ephraim was commissioned in 1834 by actor James Henry Hackett, who asked Neal to "squat right down & in your ready style in two or three days conjure me together something 'curious nice.'" Hackett rejected the play upon receipt as unsuitable for production: too many roles requiring a rural Maine accent, unrealistic set requirements, and too much scheduled improvisation. The play nevertheless represents "a significant advance in early American theatrical realism" and is the "fullest detailing of Yankee dialect" of any work Neal produced.

Neal's most noteworthy work of theatrical criticism is his five-installment essay "The Drama" (1829). Condemning stilted dialogue, Neal contended that "when a person talks beautifully in his sorrow, it shows both great preparation and insincerity" and urged that playwrights should, "avoid poetry whenever the characters are much in earnest." Sixty years later William Dean Howells was considered innovative for saying the same thing.

== Editing ==
Periodicals under John Neal's editorship
Title	Period	Headquarters
The Portico	Final issue: April–June 1818	Baltimore, MD
Federal Republican and Baltimore Telegraph	February–July 1819	Baltimore, MD
The Yankee	January 1, 1828 – December 1829	Portland, ME
The New-England Galaxy	January–December 1835	Boston, MA
The New World	January–April 1840	New York, NY
Brother Jonathan	May–December 1843	New York, NY
Portland Transcript	June 10 – July 8, 1848	Portland, ME

Neal found his first two positions as editor through fellow members of the Delphian Club in Baltimore. His longest stint as editor was for The Yankee, which he founded only a few months after returning from London in 1827. Maine's first literary periodical, it ran weekly until, for financial reasons, it merged with a Boston magazine and was renamed The Yankee and Boston Literary Gazette as a monthly publication. It merged with Ladies' Magazine when it ceased publication at the end of 1829. When starting his last stint as editor, he declared, "Having ten or fifteen minutes to spare, we have made up our minds to edit a newspaper." After Neal left in a huff few weeks later, the next editor announced, "John Neal has retired from the editorship of the Transcript, the fifteen minutes having expired."

Despite professing allegiance to Benthamian Utilitarianism in The Yankee, Neal dedicated much more space in its pages to reinforcing Northern New England's standing on the national stage and championing American regionalism. His regionalism was distinct from those later in the century "who tended to portray regional spaces in nostalgic or sentimental terms as 'enclaves of tradition' that were posed against an increasingly urban and industrial nation." Instead, "Neal remained committed to imagining regions as dynamic, future-oriented spaces whose identities would—and should—remain elusive."

Controversial at the time for its lack of association with any political party or other interest group, The Yankee was free to cover "every thing [sic] from church to state, from the tallest tome, no matter how thick, down to the smallest affairs, of tokens and souvenirs and lady-actress's feet—of poets and dogs, of paintings and side-walks, of Bentham and Jeffrey, and sleigh-rides and huskings, of politics and religion, and 'courting' and 'blackberrying.'" The magazine's greatest impact on literature was uplifting new voices like John Greenleaf Whittier, Edgar Allan Poe, Henry Wadsworth Longfellow, Elizabeth Oakes Smith, and Nathaniel Hawthorne. Most of the new writers whose works he published and wrote about in The Yankee were women.

== Lecturing ==
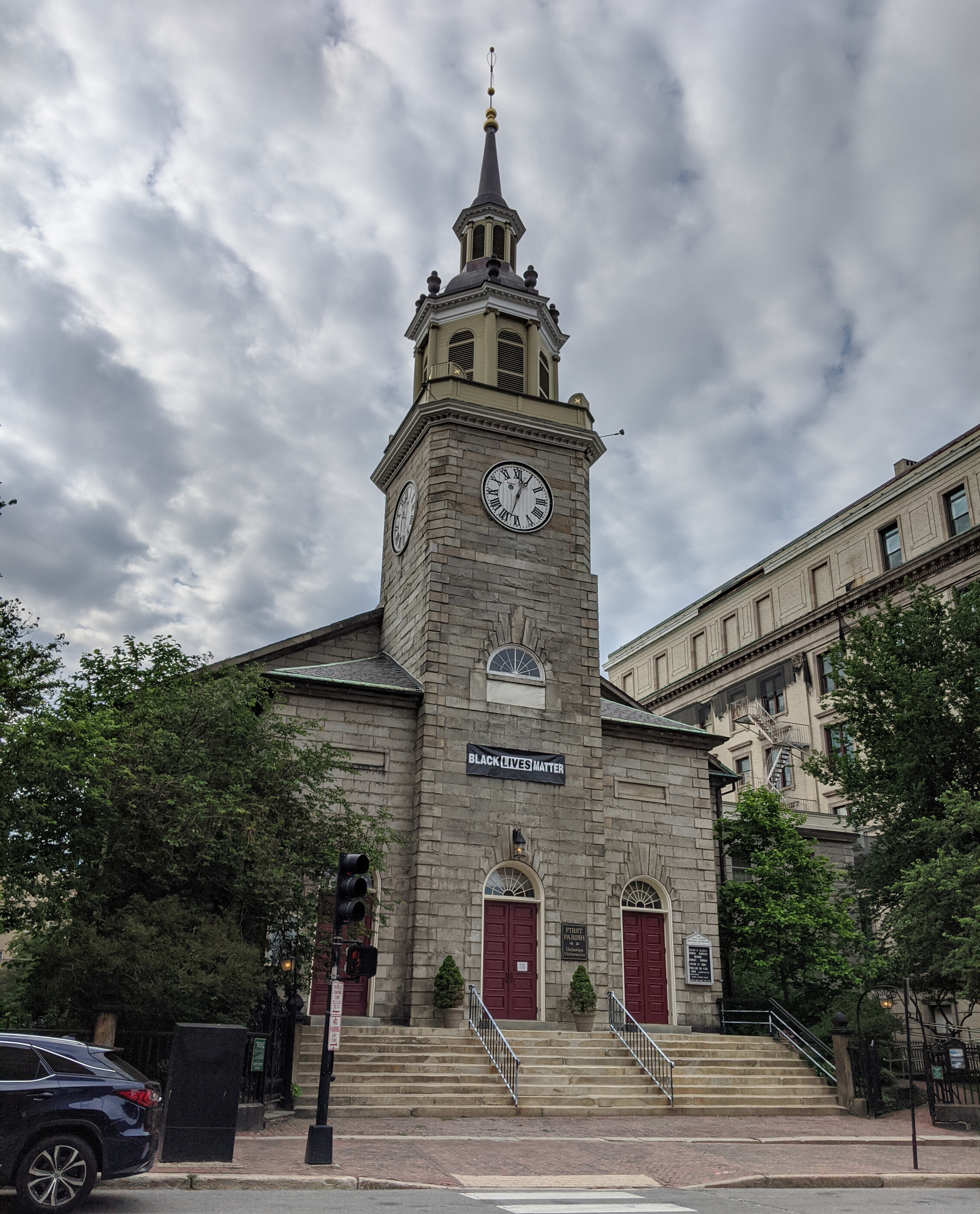
First Parish Church, the site of John Neal's first scheduled lecture in 1829

Between 1829 and 1848, Neal supplemented his income as a lecturer. Traveling on the lyceum movement circuit, he covered topics such as "literature, eloquence, the fine arts, political economy, temperance, poets and poetry, public-speaking, our pilgrim-fathers, colonization, law and lawyers, the study of languages, natural-history, phrenology, women's-rights, self-education, self-reliance, and self-distrust, progress of opinion, &c., &c., &c.".

When asked without notice to address the theme of freedom in Portland, Maine, on Independence Day 1832, Neal accepted and gave an unprepared speech that was his first on women's rights. He used the principles of the American Revolution to attack slavery as an affront to liberty, and female disfranchisement and coverture as taxation without representation. Women's rights became a favorite topic of his frequent lecture engagements between 1832 and 1843 throughout the northeastern states. As they were almost always published afterward and often covered in newspaper reviews, these events broadened Neal's sphere of influence and made his ideas accessible to readers not necessarily aligned with his views. Margaret Fuller admired Neal's "magnetic genius", "lion heart", and "sense of the ludicrous" as a lecturer, though she poked fun at his "exaggeration and coxcombry". His most well-attended and influential address was the 1843 "Rights of Women" speech at New York City's largest auditorium at the time, the Broadway Tabernacle.

== Activism and views ==
Using magazine and newspaper articles, short stories, novels, lectures, political organizing, and personal relationships, Neal throughout his adult life addressed issues including capital punishment, dueling, feminism, insolvency law, lotteries, militia tax, rights of American Indians, rights of free Black Americans, slavery, social hierarchy, temperance, and women's rights. Of these, "women's rights were the cause for which he fought longer and more consistently than for any other." Much of Neal's writing and lecturing on these topics demonstrated "a basic distrust of institutions and a continuing plea for self-examination and self-reliance".

Additionally, Neal was heavily involved in William Henry Harrison's 1840 presidential campaign, which almost resulted in his appointment as a district attorney. He also promoted the pseudoscience movements animal magnetism, clairvoyance, phrenology, and spiritualism.

=== Bankruptcy law ===
Neal became active in bankruptcy law reform shortly after his own bankruptcy in 1816. As a young Baltimore lawyer he took an unpopular stance against Chief Justice Marshall's opinion in Sturges v. Crowninshield (1819) and played a prominent role in the movement for a national bankruptcy law. He continued by attacking the policy of imprisonment for debt in his Baltimore novels and in American and British newspapers later in the 1820s.

=== Capital punishment ===
Neal began his campaign against public executions after witnessing one in Baltimore. He attacked capital punishment by writing in newspapers, magazines, novels, and debates, achieving national influence in the US and reaching a more limited audience in the UK. Late in life he related still "having no belief in the wisdom of strangulation, for men, women, and children, however they might seem to deserve it, and being fully persuaded that the worst men have most need of repentance, and that they who are unfit to live, are still more unfit to die."

=== Dueling ===
In his first novel (1817), Neal portrayed dueling as a holdover from an aristocratic era that is immoral, pointless, antidemocratic, and anti-American, charging "that here, in America, a gentleman may cut another's throat, or blow out his brains with complete impunity." His "Essay on Duelling" that year attacked the institution as a gendered performance, or "the unqualified evidence of manhood", believing that "in his closet every man wishes duelling abolished, and if every man who wishes it sincerely in private would but speak as firmly in publick [sic], it would be abolished."

=== Feminism and women's rights ===
Neal was America's first women's rights lecturer and one of the first men to advocate for women's rights and feminist causes in the US. At least as early as 1817 and late as 1873, he used journalism, fiction, lectures, political organizing, and personal relationships to advance feminist issues in the US and UK, reaching the height of his influence in this field around 1843. Neal supported female writers and organizers, affirmed intellectual equality between men and women, fought coverture laws against women's economic rights, and demanded suffrage, equal pay, and better education for women.

Neal's early focus on women's education was primarily influenced by Mary Wollstonecraft's A Vindication of the Rights of Woman as well as works by Catharine Macaulay and Judith Sargent Murray. His early feminist essays from the 1820s fill an intellectual gap between eighteenth-century feminists and their pre-Seneca Falls Convention successors Sarah Moore Grimké, Elizabeth Cady Stanton, and Margaret Fuller. As a male writer insulated from many forms of attack leveled against earlier female feminist thinkers, Neal's advocacy was crucial to bringing the field back into published discourse in the US and UK after a lull at the turn of the century.

From the "feminist undertones" in his first novel (1817) through the illustrations of "patriarchal cruelty" in Errata (1823) and "Idiosyncrasies" (1843) to the vindication of independent, unmarried women in True Womanhood (1859), Neal broke with writers of his generation by consciously and consistently including women and women's issues throughout his career as a writer of fiction. "Idiosyncrasies" explored the male feminist perspective through the character Lee who said, "we men ... imprison the soul of woman, and set a seal upon her faculties— ... allowing her no share whatever in ... governing ourselves: Having found the cause, ... and believing in my heart ... that where the evil was, there the remedy must be sought for, I went to work".

"Men and Women" (1824), his first feminist essay, recalls the eighteenth-century priority of female education: "Wait until women are educated like men—treated like men—and permitted to talk freely, without being put to shame, because they are women". At that future time, he posited that the greatest of male writers "will be equalled by women". Going further than his predecessors on intellectual equality, he "maintain[ed] that women are not inferior to men, but only unlike men, in their intellectual properties" and "would have women treated like men, of common sense." The article more fully explores the concept he raised in "Essay on Duelling" (1817), in which when he urged women to use "the reason that Heaven has apportioned so equally between her, and her brother" to rid the world of duels.

Over the 1820s, Neal shifted his focus from educational and intellectual ideas to political and economic issues like coverture and suffrage. In an 1845 letter to activist Margaret Fuller, he said

I tell you there is no hope for woman, till she has a hand in making the law—no chance for her till her vote is worth as much as a mans [sic] vote. When it is—woman will not be fobbed off with a six-pence a day for the very work a man would get a dollar for ... All you and others are doing to elevate woman, is only fitted to make her feel more sensibly the long abuse of her own understanding, when she comes to her senses. You might as well educate slaves—and still keep them in bondage.

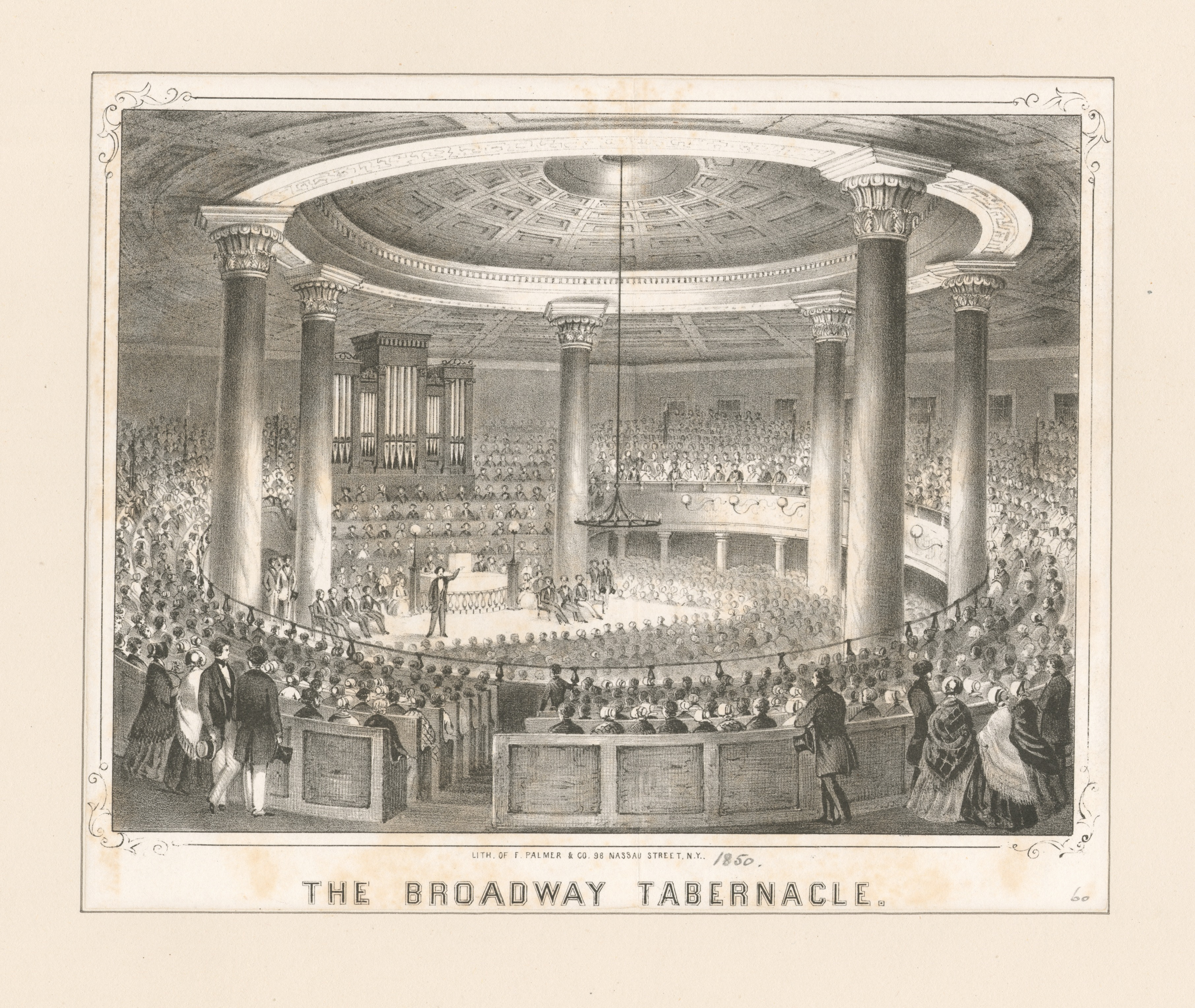
The Broadway Tabernacle as it appeared at the time of John Neal's "Rights of Women" speech on January 24, 1843

Neal delivered America's first women's rights lecture as an Independence Day address in Portland, Maine in 1832. He declared that under coverture and without suffrage, women were victims of the same crime of taxation without representation that caused the Revolutionary War. He reached the peak of his influence on feminist issues at the time of his "Rights of Women" speech (1843) before a crowd of 3,000 people in New York City. He attacked the concept of virtual representation in government that suffrage opponents argued women could enjoy through men: "Just reverse the condition of the two sexes: give to Women all the power now enjoyed by Men ... What a clamour there would be then, about equal rights, about a privileged class, about being taxed without their own consent, and virtual representation, and all that!"

The "Rights of Women" speech was widely covered, albeit dismissed, by the press, and Neal printed it later that year in the pages of Brother Jonathan magazine, of which he was editor. He used that magazine in 1843 to publish his own essays calling for equal pay and better workplace conditions for women, and to host a printed debate of correspondence on the merits of women's suffrage between himself and Eliza W. Farnham. Looking back more than forty years later, the second volume of the History of Woman Suffrage (1887) remembered that the lecture "roused considerable discussion ..., was extensively copied, and ... had a wide, silent influence, preparing the way for action. It was a scathing satire, and men felt the rebuke."

For twenty years following his work with Brother Jonathan magazine, Neal wrote about women almost exclusively in fiction but only occasionally about feminist issues in periodicals. He mused about crossdressing and the performative nature of gender in "Masquerading" (1864), "one of the most interesting essays of his career". He followed this with two women's rights essays for the American Phrenological Journal (1867), the women's rights chapter of his autobiography (1869), and twelve articles in The Revolution (1868–1870).

Neal became prominently involved as an organizer in the women's suffrage movement following the Civil War, finding influence in local, regional, and national organizations. When the American Equal Rights Association split in 1869 over the Fifteenth Amendment, Neal regretted the division of efforts, but lent his support to the subsequent National Woman Suffrage Association because of its insistence upon immediate suffrage for all women. He cofounded the New England Woman Suffrage Association in 1868, organized Portland's first public meeting on women's suffrage in 1870, and cofounded Maine's first statewide Woman Suffrage Association in 1873.

=== Lotteries ===
Neal made his earliest arguments against lotteries in Baltimore newspapers as a law apprentice, then in Logan (1822). His argument that the law should treat lotteries the same as other forms of gambling found influence across the US and in the House of Commons of the United Kingdom. In The Yankee, he "opened fire upon all [lottery] offices, ... both at the bar, and in our legislative halls, and never rested, until the system was up-rooted ... throughout our whole country". Lotteries fell into disfavor in the US in the 1830s.

=== Militia tax ===
In his "United States" essay (1826), Neal made his first published argument against the poll tax that financed the US militia system. He said that both "the poor and the rich are taxed ... under the militia law" which was designed "to defend property of the rich man. The rich, of course, do not appear in the field. The poor do. The latter cannot afford to keep away; the former can." He proposed replacing the poll tax with a property tax to pay men serving in militias, thereby making the system more equitable.

=== Rights of American Indians ===
Neal published essays, novels, and short stories to advocate the rights of American Indians. At a time when "native American" was a nativist term referring to Anglo-Americans, Neal declared in his first novel (1817) that "the Indian is the only native American." In "A Summary View of America" (1824), Neal argued that American Indians "have never been the aggressors" in conflicts with European-Americans and that "no people, ancient or modern ... have been so deplorably oppressed, belied, and wronged, in every possible way." He called for recognition of Indigenous sovereignty, decrying that "the law of nations has never been regarded, in dealing with them: ... their ambassadors have been seized, imprisoned, and butchered, ... [and] war has never been declared against them". Outlining the process by which the US government seized Indigenous land, Neal said,

The frontier people pick a quarrel with the Indians ... No declaration of war follows; no ceremony; but, forth goes General [Andrew] Jackson—or general somebody else; wasting and firing the whole country. A truce follows: a ceding of the conquered country—for the protection of the whites.

Neal used novels like Logan (1822) to challenge racial boundaries between White and Indigenous Americans. Reacting to the Indian Removal Act (1830) and popular literature that supported it, Neal published the short story "David Whicher" (1832) to explore peaceful multiethnic coexistence in the US. The tale also "contested how popular literature employed colonial violence to provide a model of and justification for its continuation in the name of national expansion".

=== Rights of Black Americans ===
Neal protested disfranchisement of free Black Americans by revealing how "free-born Americans, ... because of their colour," not just in the slave states, "but in the states where slavery is regarded with horror ... are suffered even to vote, ... being either excluded by law ... or excluded, by fear". Wary of "practical racism" among White Northerners, Neal drew attention to members of his gymnasium who in 1828 "voted that ... no colored man ... can be permitted to exercise with white citizens of our free and equal-community. Hurra for New-England! We have no prejudices here—None but wholesome prejudices, at any rate." Disappointed they would not admit the Black men he sponsored for membership, Neal ended his involvement with the gym shortly thereafter. In fiction, Neal explored the differences between Northern and Southern prejudices against Black Americans, particularly in The Down-Easters (1833). He nevertheless believed in phrenological inferiority, explaining that "while we disregard colour, we pay great attention to form, in our estimation of capacity. The negro head is very bad." This led him to a proto-eugenicist argument for legalizing interracial marriage so that future generations of "the negroes of America would no longer be a separate, inferior class, without political power, without privilege, and without a share in the great commonwealth".

=== Slavery ===
Neal was "resolutely and heartily opposed to slavery", interpreting the ideals of the Declaration of Independence to mean that "the slaves in America were created free ... Ergo—They may abolish the government, which, by keeping them as they are kept, has 'violated its trust.'" In reaction to widespread rape of enslaved women, he reported that "white fathers ... are guilty of selling their own flesh and blood to bondage ... In the Southern States of America, where coloured women are sought after, purchased, and cohabited with by white men ... because the profit of the master is in direct proportion to the fruitfulness of the slave."

Believing that "sudden emancipation of the whole [enslaved population], at once, is impossible" and that it would perpetuate Black Americans' status as "a much-to-be-dreaded caste" in the US, he supported "gradual emancipation [which] has done well in the New England states; and in New York." Because New England had "nothing to lose by emancipation; but rather ... much to gain by it; since the value of white labour would rise", Neal called for federally-funded compensated emancipation to spread the cost throughout the states.

Neal supported the American Colonization Society, founding the Portland, Maine local chapter in 1833, serving as its secretary, and later meeting with Liberia's first president, Joseph Jenkins Roberts. Neal likely avoided the movement for "immediate, unconditional, and universal emancipation" because of a long-standing feud with William Lloyd Garrison. The feud was not resolved until Neal declared in 1865 that "I was wrong ... and Mr. Garrison was right."

=== Social hierarchy ===
Neal's Quaker upbringing likely instilled in him an aversion to "worldly titles" he said were unfitting in republican society. He mocked them with humorous works like the title page of his first novel (1817) that claimed the book was "Reviewed By—Himself—'Esquire.'" In "A Summary View of America" (1824) he decried that the US had fallen away from its ideals of equality to a place in which "titles are multiplying ... Even the pride of ancestry ... has found root in that republican soil. There is a tremendous contention ... between the families of yesterday, and those of the day before." As a lawyer he refused to address Chief Justice John Marshall or any other judge as "your honor," claiming that "there is no greater humbug in the minds of men than this obsequious bowing to men of high station. The great thinkers of the world are the workers of the world, the producers of the world."

=== Temperance ===
As a child, Neal decided to avoid intemperate drinking and maintained this personal conviction throughout his life. He did not associate himself with the temperance movement until after he returned to Portland, Maine, from London. His first invitation to lecture an audience was for the annual address for the Portland Association for the Promotion of Temperance in 1829. Neal Dow, John Neal's cousin, was a leader of the prohibition movement, and in 1836 Neal engaged in public debates with his cousin to defend moderate wine drinking as an alternative to total abstinence. It was in this period between the late 1830s and late 1840s that Neal became disillusioned with the temperance movement, which had moved away from a focus on moral suasion to enacting prohibition laws; Dow and his followers "instead of regarding the injunction, 'Be temperate in all things,' were furiously intemperate on the subject of temperance; making total abstinence the condition of citizenship, and almost of civilization." Neal remained convinced of "the evils of intemperance ... They could not well be exaggerated; the only question was about the remedy."

== Legacy ==
=== Scattered genius ===
I AM called upon for a Preface. Like the "weary knife-grinder," when asked for a story, I am half tempted to answer, "Preface! God bless you! I've none to give you, sir!"

My book itself is only a Preface. And what, after all, is any Life but a preface?—a preface to something better—or worse?

On the whole, therefore, I think it safer for me, and better for the reader, whom I hope to be on good terms with, before he gets through, whatever may be his present notions upon the subject, not to trouble him with a Preface.

— John Neal, Preface to Wandering Recollections of a Somewhat Busy Life: An Autobiography, 1869

Neal's reputation as an intellectually dispersed and uncontrolled genius is supported by biographer Windsor Daggett, who said "he scattered his genius into many channels at a loss." Historian Edward H. Elwell said "he wrote for everything because he could not write long for anything." By Neal's own admission, a year-long stint as newspaper editor was "a long while, for any thing [sic] I had to do with." American literature scholar Fred Lewis Pattee saw Neal's as "genius of a type that must be especially defined" with words like "energy and persistence" but also "ignorance colossal". American literature scholar Theresa A. Goddu concluded that Neal had been canonized as "half wildman, half genius". Edgar Allan Poe was "inclined to rank John Neal first, or at all events second, among our men of indisputable genius", but in the same paragraph rated his work as "massive and undetailed", "hurried and indistinct", and "deficient in a sense of completeness".

Contemporaries and scholars of Neal alike are disposed to lament his inability to achieve what others saw as the potential of his abilities. Biographer Donald A. Sears classified him as "a writer without a masterpiece" who "lived to be eclipsed by writers of lesser genius but greater control of their talents." Daggett said "he flashed youthful brilliance. He never quite caught up with it or conquered it, and so he sometimes wore the stamp of failure in the minds of his contemporaries." American literature scholar Alexander Cowie referred to Neal as "the victim of his own lust for words" with "no single work of fiction which deserves to be revived for its sheer merit" and no books "worth placing on the shelves of any library save as a 'believe it or not' specimen". In an 1848 poem, James Russell Lowell classified Neal as "a man who made less than he might have" who was good at "whisking out flocks of comets, but never a star" because he was "too hasty to wait till Art's ripe fruit should drop", and concluded that "could he only have waited he might have been great".

=== Influence ===
Neal's creative work had indirect influence on many writers during and after his life. Seba Smith, Nathaniel Hawthorne, and Henry Wadsworth Longfellow are all known to have enjoyed and been influenced by Neal's early poems and novels. Smith is most famous for his "Jack Downing" humor series, which was likely influenced by Neal's humorous use of regional dialect. It is also likely that Edgar Allan Poe developed many of his characteristic traits as a writer under the influence of Neal's articles in The Yankee in the late 1820s.

Many scholars conclude that most defining authors of the mid-nineteenth-century American renaissance earned their reputations by employing techniques learned from Neal's work earlier in the century, among them Ralph Waldo Emerson, Walt Whitman, Edgar Allan Poe, and Herman Melville. Biographer Benjamin Lease pointed to Neal's comparatively better remembered immediate predecessors, Washington Irving and James Fenimore Cooper, as lacking an obvious link to those mid-century masters that Neal clearly demonstrates. He further argued that Neal's ability to influence such disparate figures as Poe and Whitman demonstrates the weight of his work.

=== Historical status ===
Aligned with their twentieth-century predecessors, both Lease and Sears in the 1970s classified John Neal as a transitional figure in literature who came after the initial wave of British-imitating American literature but before the great American Renaissance that occurred after Neal had published the bulk of his work. More recent scholarship placed Neal "Not exactly 'beneath' the 'American Renaissance'", but "scattered across it." American literature scholars Edward Watts, David J. Carlson, and Maya Merlob contended that Neal was written out of the Renaissance because of his distance from the Boston–Concord circle and his utilization of popular styles and modes viewed at a lower artistic level. Despite this neglect in the 20th century, Neal's life and works started experiencing a resurgence in interest among scholars in the 21st century.

== Selected works ==
Novels

- Keep Cool, A Novel (Note: Neal published Keep Cool under the pen name "Somebody, M.D.C.", which stands for "Member of the Delphian Club".) (1817) Full text
- Logan, a Family History (1822) Full text
- Seventy-Six (1823) Full text
- Randolph, A Novel (1823) Full text
- Errata; or, the Works of Will. Adams (1823) Full text
- Brother Jonathan: or, the New Englanders (1825) Full text (vol I), (vol II), (vol III)
- Rachel Dyer: a North American Story (1828) Full text
- Authorship, a Tale (Note: Neal published Authorship under the pen name "A New Englander Over-Sea".) (1830) Full text
- The Down-Easters, &c. &c. &c. (1833) Full text (vol I), (vol II)
- True Womanhood: A Tale (1859) Full text

Posthumous collections

- American Writers: A Series of Papers Contributed to Blackwood's Magazine (1824–1825) (Note: Neal published the original American Writers series under the pen name "Carter Holmes" – one of many British personas he used while writing for magazines from London.) (1937) – edited by Fred Lewis Pattee Full text
- Observations on American Art: Selections from the Writings of John Neal (1793–1876) (1943) – edited by Harold Edward Dickson
- The Genius of John Neal: Selections from His Writings (1978) – edited by Benjamin Lease and Hans-Joachim Lang

Short stories

- "Otter-Bag, the Oneida Chief" (1829) Full text
- "The Haunted Man" (1832) Full text
- "David Whicher" (1832) Full text
- "The Squatter" (1835) Full text
- "The Young Phrenologist" (1835) Full text
- "Idiosyncracies" (1843) Full text (ch 1), (ch 2)

Poems

- Battle of Niagara (Note: Neal published "Battle of Niagara" under the pen name "John O'Cataract", which is a variation on his Delphian Club pen name.) (1818) Full text

Drama

- Otho: a Tragedy, in Five Acts (1819) Full text
- Our Ephraim, or The New Englanders, A What-d'ye-call-it?–in three Acts (1835)

Other works

- One Word More: Intended for the Reasoning and Thoughtful among Unbelievers (1854) Full text
- Wandering Recollections of a Somewhat Busy Life: An Autobiography (1869) Full text
- Great Mysteries and Little Plagues (1870) Full text
- Portland Illustrated (1874) – A guide to Portland, Maine Full text
