= Paul Allen (editor) =

American poet, historian, and editor

- Born: February 15, 1775; Providence, Rhode Island, U.S.
- Died: August 18, 1826; Baltimore, Maryland, U.S.
- Education: Brown University
- Occupations: Writer, poet, historian, editor

Paul Allen (February 15, 1775 – August 18, 1826) was an American poet, historian, and editor.

== Biography ==
Born in Providence, Rhode Island, on February 15, 1775, Allen studied at Brown University, graduating in 1793. He later relocated to Philadelphia, where he served as editor of The Port Folio, the Gazette of the United States, and the Federal Republican.

While in Philadelphia, he edited a two-volume history of the Lewis and Clark Expedition, published in 1814 in that city, but without mention of the actual author, banker Nicholas Biddle.

Allen reached the height of his reputation after he moved to Baltimore, where he served as editor of the short-lived Journal of the Times and the more-successful Baltimore Morning Chronicle. He also joined the Delphian Club, where he earned the "clubicular" name of Solomon Fitz Quizz and the title of Professor of Loblology, which was defined as "the science of endeavoring to do that which is impossible."

He proposed publishing A History of the American Revolution, but relied on fellow Delphians John Neal and Dr. Tobias Watkins to write all but the preface to satisfy the subscribers to its publication in 1819.

Thomas Jefferson considered Allen the country's best author of prose. In his 1824–25 critical work American Writers, Neal's assessment was more nuanced: "Mr. Allen is a showy, eloquent prose-writer—who never thinks, and, if he can help it, never reasons .... His prose is full of poetry—his poetry is miserably full of prose."

== Death ==
Allen died in 1826, at which time he was still editor of the Baltimore Morning Chronicle.
