= William Gwynn (attorney) =

Irish-born American lawyer, newspaper editor, and civic leader

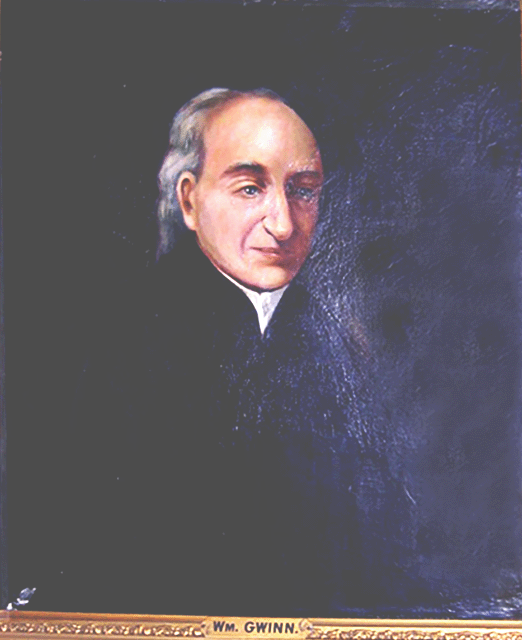
- Portrait of Baltimore attorney William Gwynn (c. 1840)
- Born: 1775; Ireland
- Died: August 14, 1854 (aged 78–79); Harford County, Maryland, U.S.
- Occupation: Lawyer · newspaper editor
- Organizations: Hibernian Society of Baltimore (vice‑president, 1803); Delphian Club (president, 1824–1825)
- Known for: Editor‑proprietor of the Federal Gazette and Baltimore Daily Advertiser

William Gwynn (1775 – August 14, 1854) was an Irish‑born American lawyer, newspaper editor, and civic leader based in Baltimore, Maryland. He owned and edited the Federal Gazette and Baltimore Daily Advertiser—often called the Baltimore Gazette—for more than two decades, co‑founded the Hibernian Society of Baltimore, and argued a transportation case for the Baltimore and Ohio Railroad (B&O).

== Early life and education ==
Gwynn was born in Ireland in 1775 to John Gwynn; the family emigrated to Baltimore during William's childhood. He read law in Maryland and, at age 23, was appointed a tax commissioner for Baltimore County in 1798. After admission to the bar he established a successful city practice.

== Career ==
=== Legal career ===
In 1831 Gwynn joined Roger B. Taney, Reverdy Johnson, and John H. B. Latrobe in arguing the Baltimore and Ohio Rail Road Company case against the Chesapeake and Ohio Canal Company before the Maryland chancellor. He later served as Baltimore City Counsellor (municipal attorney) from 1840 to 1841. Gwynn also used his newspaper, the Gazette, to champion civic improvements such as Baltimore's early gas lighting system.

=== Newspaper career ===
Gwynn purchased the Federal Gazette and Baltimore Daily Advertiser in 1812 and remained editor-proprietor until 1834. He then sold the daily to his protégé William Gwynn Jones but reassumed control in 1835 after Jones was imprisoned for mail theft; the paper ceased publication on 30 December 1837. Under Gwynn the Gazette advocated internal improvements, public works, and the arts, giving him broad regional influence.

== Affiliations and public service ==
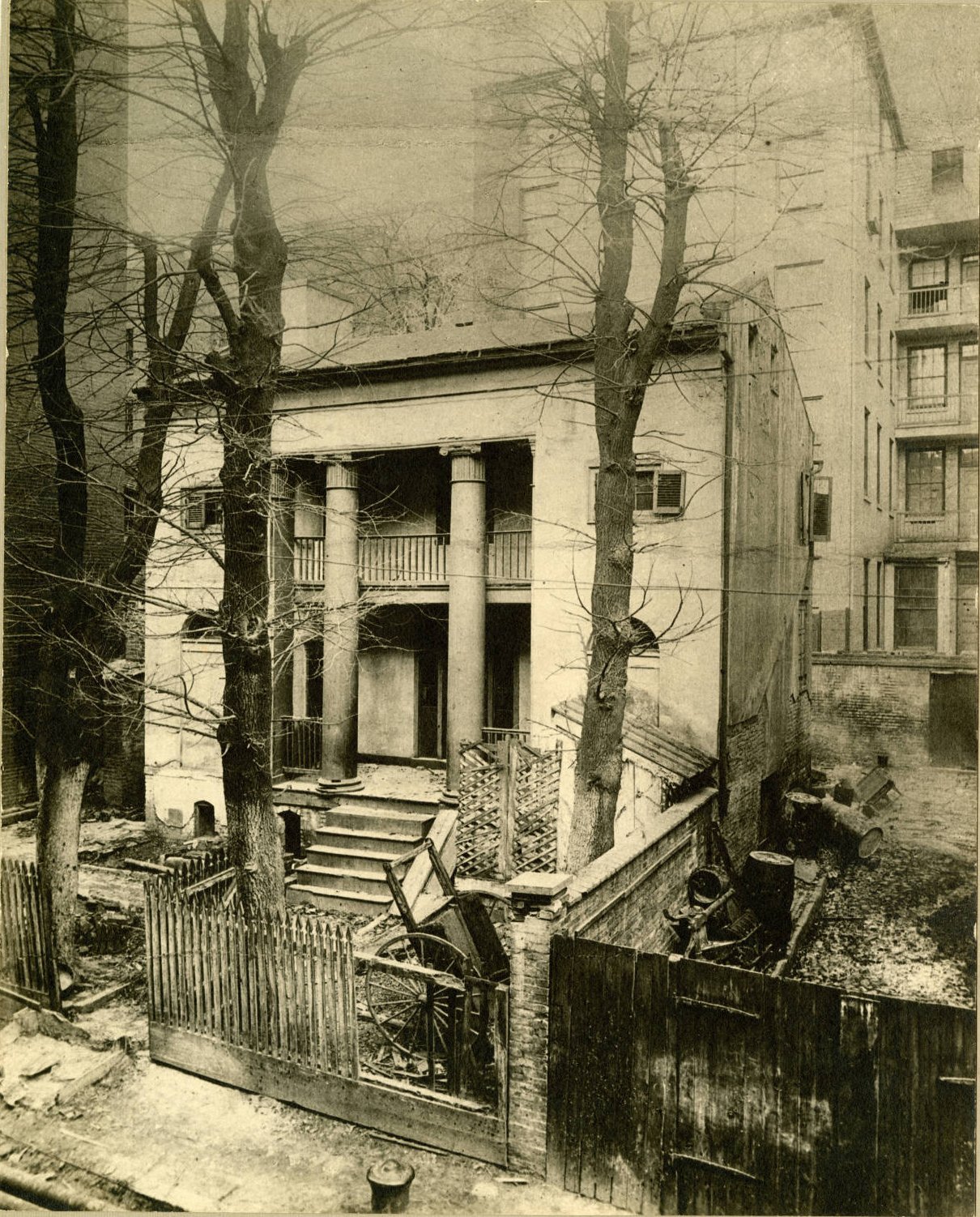
Gwynn's Tusculum

A founding member and first vice‑president of the Hibernian Society of Baltimore (1803), Gwynn helped draft its 1816 constitution. He led fundraising for projects such as the Washington Monument in Washington, D.C. He also co‑founded the Baltimore Gas Light Company in 1816 and, served on the company's first board of directors, helped draft its enabling ordinance, and promoted gas illumination in the city through editorial campaigns in the Gazette. and promoted regional transport through editorials and advocacy.

Gwynn joined the Delphian Club once it started meeting in August 1823, following a two-year hiatus. He earned the "clubicular" name "Odopoeus Oligostichus", the title "Professor of Impromptology" (impromptu speeches), and was elected vice president (called the "flamen"). He worked with six other Delphians to collaboratively write a novel called Incomprehensibility by taking turns writing chapters. According to historian John Earle Uhler: "It is entirely devoid of merit, being vague, verbose, and tiresome." Upon the death of Delphian William H. Winder in June 1824, membership elected Gwynn to succeed him as president ("tripod"). Starting August 1824, he began hosting all Delphian Club meetings at his Greek Revival home, Tusculum, which stood on Bank Lane behind Barnum's Hotel. This final year was the club's most active and festive. Uhler described Tusculum as "the headquarters of the literati, the artists, actors, and Bohemians of the time extending from about 1815 to 1830". Gwynn was still president when the club disbanded in 1825. Tusculum was demolished in 1891.

In 1828, Gwynn was a founding director and first president of the Canton Company of Baltimore. This land‑development venture purchased the Harris Creek peninsula—today the Canton neighborhood to build deep‑water wharves and factory lots. He served on the company's first board of directors, helped draft its enabling ordinance.

== Personal life ==
Gwynn never married but informally adopted William Gwynn Jones, who briefly succeeded him at the Gazette.

== Legacy ==
Gwynn mentored several members of Edgar Allan Poe's family: Poe's father, David Poe Jr., read law in Gwynn's office, and cousin Neilson Poe worked as an assistant editor at the Gazette. Gwynn also assisted Poe in publishing Al Aaraaf, Tamerlane, and Minor Poems (1829). Poe's unpublished collection of eleven satirical stories, Tales of the Folio Club (circa 1832–1836), is based on the Delphian Club, which Poe likely knew about via his acquaintance with Gwynn.

A portrait by H. G. McCann was presented to the Baltimore Bar Association in April 1863 and today hangs in the Baltimore City Circuit Court.
