= John Neal bibliography =

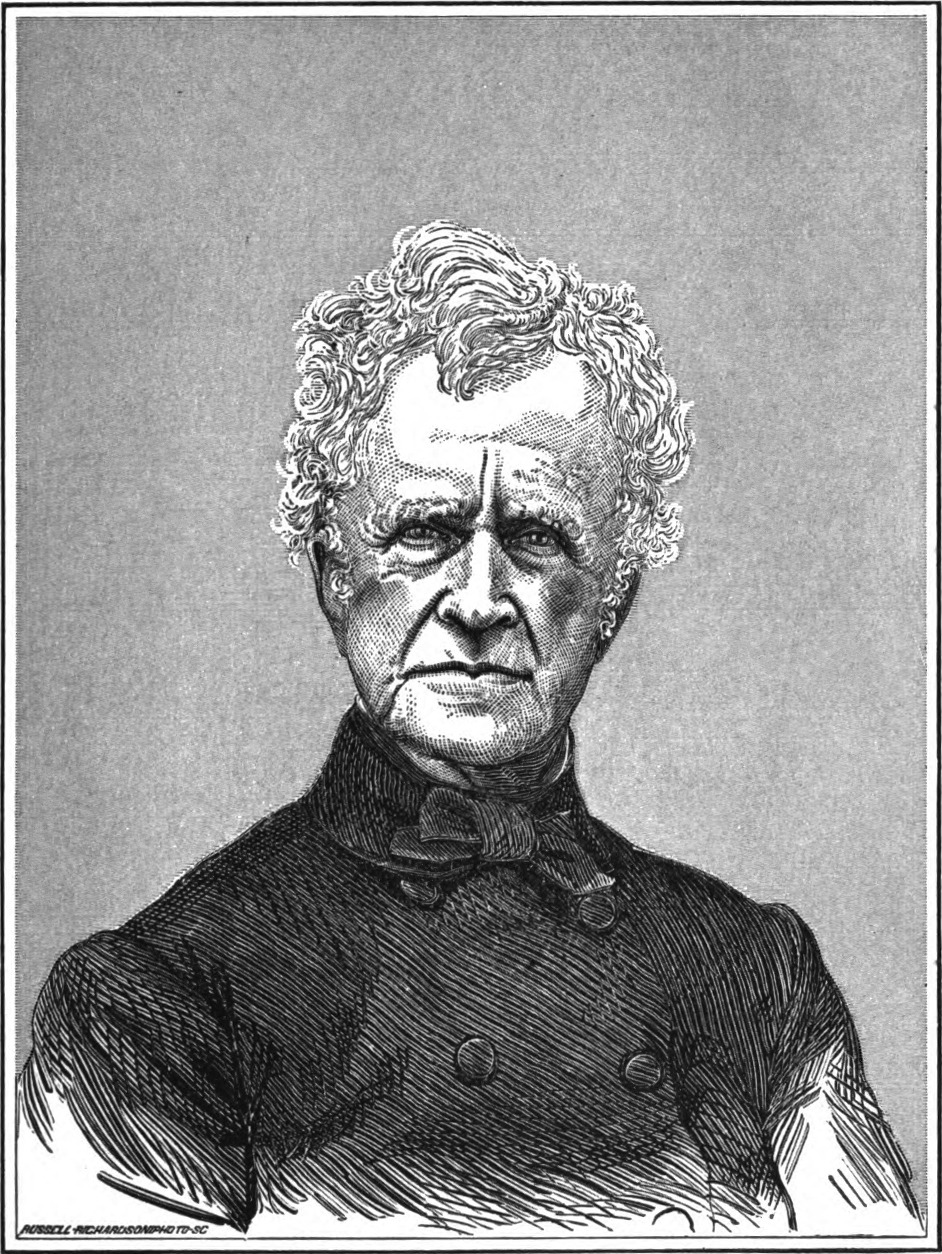
John Neal in 1874 from Portland Illustrated

The bibliography of American writer John Neal (1793–1876) spans more than sixty years from the War of 1812 through the Reconstruction era and includes novels, short stories, poetry, articles, plays, lectures, and translations published in newspapers, magazines, literary journals, gift books, pamphlets, and books. Favorite topics included women's rights, feminism, gender, race, slavery, children, education, law, politics, art, architecture, literature, drama, religion, gymnastics, civics, American history, science, phrenology, travel, language, political economy, and temperance.

Between 1817 and 1835, Neal became the first American published in British literary journals, author of the first history of American literature, the first American art critic, a children's literature pioneer, a forerunner of the American Renaissance, and one of the first American male advocates of women's rights. As the first American author to use natural diction and one of the first to write characters with regional American accents, Neal's fiction aligns with the literary nationalist and regionalist movements. A pioneer of colloquialism, Neal is the first to use the phrase son-of-a-bitch in an American work of fiction. His fiction explores the romantic and gothic genres.

Neal was a prolific contributor to periodicals, particularly in the second half of the 1830s. His critiques of literature, art, and drama anticipated future movements and contributed to the careers of many authors whose careers historically eclipsed Neal's. As a critic and political commentator, his essays and journalism showed distrust of institutions and an affinity for self-examination and self-reliance. Many of Neal's pamphlets are lectures he delivered between 1829 and 1848, when he supplemented his income by traveling on the lyceum movement circuit. He also published many short stories, averaging one per year in this time period. Neal's tales helped shape the genre and early children's literature and challenged socio-political phenomena associated with Jacksonian democracy. As a translator he worked mostly on French compositions but was able to read and write to some degree in eleven languages other than his native English. The bulk of his novels were published between 1822 and 1828 though he continued writing novels until the last decade of his life. His last major work was an 1874 guidebook for his hometown of Portland, Maine. There are four posthumous collections of his writing, published between 1920 and 1978.

== Bound publications ==
=== Novels ===
John Neal felt that novels represented the highest form of prose. As a novelist, he is recognized as "the first in America to be natural in his diction" and "the father of American subversive fiction" for developing a new "wild, rough, and defiant American style" to break with British standards then dominant in the US. A pioneer of American colloquialism and dialects in novels, Neal's novels are aligned with both the literary nationalist and regionalist movements and anticipate the American Renaissance.

Novels by John Neal
Title	Year	First publisher	Notes	Ref.
Keep Cool, A Novel	1817	Baltimore: Joseph Cushing	Explores gender roles in relationships and expresses Neal's views against dueling; in two volumes; authorship ascribed as "Written in Hot Weather, by Somebody, M.D.C. &c. &c. &c.", in which "M.D.C." stands for "Member of the Delphian Club"; republished in 2024 with footnotes and a scholarly introduction	
Logan, a Family History	1822	Philadelphia: H.C. Carey & I. Lea	A "gothic tapestry" that explores racial boundaries between White and Indigenous Americans; in two volumes; republished in London in 1823 in four volumes by A.K. Newman & Co.; republished as Logan, the Mingo Chief. A Family History "By the Author of "'Seventy-Six'" in London in 1840 by J. Cunningham	
Seventy-Six	1823	Baltimore: Joseph Robinson	First use of son-of-a-bitch in an American work of fiction; Neal's favorite of his own novels; in two volumes; published in London the same year in three volumes by Whittaker and Company; facsimile of Baltimore edition published in 1971; excerpted in The Genius of John Neal: Selections from His Writings (1978); published before Randolph and Errata	
Randolph, a Novel	1823	"Published for Whom it May Concern" (Philadelphia: Stephen Simpson)	"A story in the form of letters, giving an account of our celebrities, orators, writers, painters, &c., &c."; in two volumes; contains the earliest of Neal's significant art criticism; "By the Author of Logan — and Seventy-Six"; excerpted in American Writers: A Series of Papers Contributed to Blackwood's Magazine (1824–1825) (1937) and The Genius of John Neal: Selections from His Writings (1978); published after Seventy-Six and before Errata	
Errata; or, the Works of Will. Adams	1823	New York: Published for the Proprietors	A semi-autobiographical account of Neal's life before 1823; excerpted in the New England Galaxy (October 17 and November 28, 1835) and The Genius of John Neal: Selections from His Writings (1978); in two volumes; "A Tale by the Author of Logan, Seventy-Six, and Randolph"; published after Seventy-Six and Randolph	
Brother Jonathan: or, the New Englanders	1825	Edinburgh: William Blackwood	A story of the American Revolution depicting regional American folkways and dialect; in three volumes; excerpted in The Genius of John Neal: Selections from His Writings (1978)	
Rachel Dyer: A North American Story	1828	Portland, Maine: Shirley and Hyde	"Almost universally regarded as Neal's most successful fictional work"; first hardcover novel based on the Salem witch trials; an expansion of "New-England Witchcraft" likely written for but never published by Blackwood's Magazine in 1825, but published serially over five issues of The New-York Mirror (April 20 – May 18, 1839); republished by facsimile in 1964; excerpted in The Genius of John Neal: Selections from His Writings (1978); "Unpublished Preface" republished in "Critical Essays and Stories by John Neal" (1962)	
Authorship, a Tale	1830	Boston: Gray and Bowen	A "spritely spoof" about authors likely largely written during Neal's stay with Jeremy Bentham in London; "By a New Englander Over-Sea"	
The Down-Easters, &c. &c. &c.	1833	New York: Harper & Brothers	Showcases regional variation in American character, dialect, and setting; Neal's "fullest expression" of "regional realism"; in two volumes; includes two short stories: "Bill Frazier—the Fur Trader" and "Robert Steele"; excerpted in The Genius of John Neal: Selections from His Writings (1978)	
Ruth Elder	1843	Brother Jonathan magazine	"A Down-East story of seduction"; a serial novella published over fifteen issues (June 17, July 29, August 12, August 19, September 2, September 9, September 30, October 7, October 14, October 21, November 4, November 11, November 25, December 2, and December 9, 1843); first three installments originally published in The New Mirror (June 3, June 10, and June 17, 1843)	
True Womanhood: a Tale	1859	Boston: Ticknor and Fields	Defends the dignity of unmarried women; explores social life, business, and legal procedure in New York City; couched in an "abundant and all-pervasive" religious theme	
The White-Faced Pacer: or, Before and After the Battle	1863	New York: Beadle and Company	The top-ranked dime novel when it was published; an adaptation of "The Switch-Tail Pacer. A Tale of Other Days" (1841)	
The Moose-Hunter; or, Life in the Maine Woods	1864	New York: Beadle and Company	A dime novel	
Little Moccasin; or, Along the Madawaska	1866	New York: Beadle and Company	A dime novel; "A Story of Life and Love in the Lumber Region"; published in London the same year by George Routledge & Sons	
Live Yankees; or, The Down Easters at Home	1867	The Pen and Pencil magazine	A serial novella published over eight weekly installments; a reworking of the novel The Lumberman, rejected by Beadle and Company	

=== Collections ===
Collections of works by John Neal
Title	Editor	Year	First publisher	Notes	Ref.
Battle of Niagara, a Poem, without Notes; and Goldau, or the Maniac Harper	John Neal	1818	Baltimore: N. G. Maxwell	Recognized at the time as the best poetic description of Niagara Falls, though Neal did not see it until 1833; "By Jehu O'Cataract"	
The Battle of Niagara: Second Edition — Enlarged: with Other Poems	John Neal	1819	Baltimore: N. G. Maxwell		
Great Mysteries and Little Plagues	John Neal	1870	Boston: Roberts Brothers	A collection of stories and essays for and about children	
A Down-East Yankee from the District of Maine	Windsor Daggett	1920	Portland, Maine: A.J. Huston	A biography of Neal that includes Neal's "Rights of Women" speech (originally published in Brother Jonathan magazine June 17, 1843), as well as excerpts from Randolph, Battle of Niagara, Errata, and "Sketches of the Five American Presidents, and of the Five Presidential Candidates, from the Memoranda of a Traveller"	
American Writers: A Series of Papers Contributed to Blackwood's Magazine (1824–1825)	Fred Lewis Pattee	1937	Durham, North Carolina: Duke University Press	Criticism of 135 American authors originally published in Blackwood's Magazine; the earliest written history of American literature	
Observations on American Art: Selections from the Writings of John Neal (1793-1876)	Harold Edward Dickson	1943	State College, Pennsylvania: Pennsylvania State College	"A full collection of Neal's most important art criticism"	
The Genius of John Neal: Selections from His Writings	Benjamin Lease and Hans-Joachim Lang	1978	Durham, North Carolina: Duke University Press	Includes four short stories, excerpts from five novels, and eleven essays by Neal and notes and an introduction by the editors	

=== Nonfiction books ===
Nonfiction books by John Neal
Title	Year	First publisher	Notes	Ref.
One Word More: Intended for the Reasoning and Thoughtful among Unbelievers	1854	Portland, Maine: Ira Berry	A religious tract that "rambles passionately for two hundred pages and closes with breathless metaphor"; also published the same year in Boston by Crocker & Brewster	
Wandering Recollections of a Somewhat Busy Life	1869	Boston: Roberts Brothers	An autobiography that "presents a showy embroidery of bombast and gasconade on a firm fabric of good sound sense"; excerpted in Maine: A Literary Chronicle (1968) and The Genius of John Neal: Selections from His Writings (1978)	
Portland Illustrated	1874	Portland, Maine: W.S. Jones	A Portland, Maine guidebook "so chaotic in arrangement as to diminish greatly its usefulness"	

=== Pamphlets ===
Many of Neal's pamphlets are lectures he delivered between 1829 and 1848, when he supplemented his income by traveling on the lyceum movement circuit.

Pamphlets by John Neal
Title	Year	First publisher	Notes	Ref.
Constitution of the Portland Gymnasium with the Rules and Regulations, and the Names of the Subscribers	1828	Portland, Maine: James Adams	Handbook for the gymnasium established by Neal in 1827; published in June	
Address Delivered before the Portland Association for the Promotion of Temperance, February 11, 1829	1829	Portland, Maine: Day and Fraser	Address delivered at the First Parish Church; also published in The Yankee (1829); excerpted in the Ladies Miscellany August 18, 1829	
City of Portland, Being a General Review of the Proceedings Heretofore Had, in the Town of Portland, on the Subject of a City Government	1829	Portland, Maine: Shirley & Hyde	A "pamphlet of about fifty octavo pages, with tables, petitions, on both sides, and statistics, giving undeniable statistics, where necessary" advocating municipal incorporation as a city	
Our Country	1830	Portland, Maine: S. Colman	"An Address Delivered before the Alumni of Waterville-College, July 29, 1830"	
An Address Delivered before the M.C. Mechanics Association, Thursday Evening, Jan. 13, 1831	1831	Portland, Maine: Day and Fraser	Address delivered to the Maine Charitable Mechanic Association	
Banks and Banking	1837	Portland, Maine: Orion Office	"A Letter to the Bank Directors of Portland"; "This communication accused banks of ungenerous response to the curtailment in public demand upon them. Neal, among others, had striven to secure leniency of demand upon the local banks in their critical hour, and he now accused the banks of failure to reciprocate with a proper leniency toward the public."	
Oration: By John Neal, Portland, July 4, 1838	1838	Portland, Maine: Arthur Shirley	Address delivered for a meeting of the Portland, Maine Whigs	
Man	1838	Providence: Knowles, Vose & Company	"A Discourse, before the United Brothers' Society of Brown University, September 4, 1838"	
An Address before the Maine Charitable Mechanic Association, September 26, 1838	1838	Portland, Maine: Charles Day & Co	In First Exhibition and Fair of the Maine Charitable Mechanic Association	
Appeal from the American Press to the American People, in Behalf of John Bratish Eliovich	1840	Portland, Maine: Argus Office	A collection of letters written for, but refused by The New World defending alleged con man John Bratish Eliovich from recent attacks in periodicals; disavowed by Neal in 1844	
The Past, Present and Future of the City of Cairo, in North America: with Reports, Estimates and Statistics	1858	Portland, Maine: Brown Thurston	Concerning land development in Cairo, Illinois, in which Neal invested money; based largely on a trip to Cairo by Neal in 1858	
Account of the Great Conflagration in Portland, July 4th & 5th, 1866	1866	Portland, Maine: Starbird & Twitchell	Concerning the 1866 great fire of Portland, Maine	

=== Collaborative works ===
Collaborative publications containing works by John Neal
Title	Year	First publisher	Neal's contribution	Notes	Ref.
General Index to the First Twelve Volumes, or First Series, of Niles' Weekly Register	1818	Baltimore: Hezekiah Niles	The index	The product of sixteen hours of labor a day by Neal, seven days a week, for over four months; "the most laborious work of the kind that ever appeared in any country"	
A History of the American Revolution	1819	Baltimore: John Hopkins	Vol. 1, pp. 253–592 and all of vol. 2	Republished in Baltimore in 1822 by Franklin Betts; pp. 1–252 by Tobias Watkins; preface by Paul Allen	
Second Report of the Geology of the State of Maine	1838	Augusta, Maine: State of Maine	Pp. 110–112	Otherwise written by Charles T. Jackson	
The Sinless Child, and Other Poems, by Elizabeth Oakes Smith	1843	New York: Wiley & Putnam	The preface: a biographical sketch of Elizabeth Oakes Smith and Seba Smith	Also published in Boston the same year by W.D. Ticknor	
The Works of Jeremy Bentham	1843	Edinburgh: W. Tait	Vol. 9, pp. 660–662, 648	Edited by John Bowring	
The Proceedings of the Woman's Rights Convention, Held at Syracuse, September 8th, 9th, & 10th, 1852	1852	Syracuse: J. E. Masters	Pp. 24–28: A letter by Neal read at the 1852 National Woman's Rights Convention by Elizabeth Oakes Smith	Prompted the conference leadership to appoint Neal as the Maine representative to the central committee for organizing the next annual convention	

== Selected articles ==
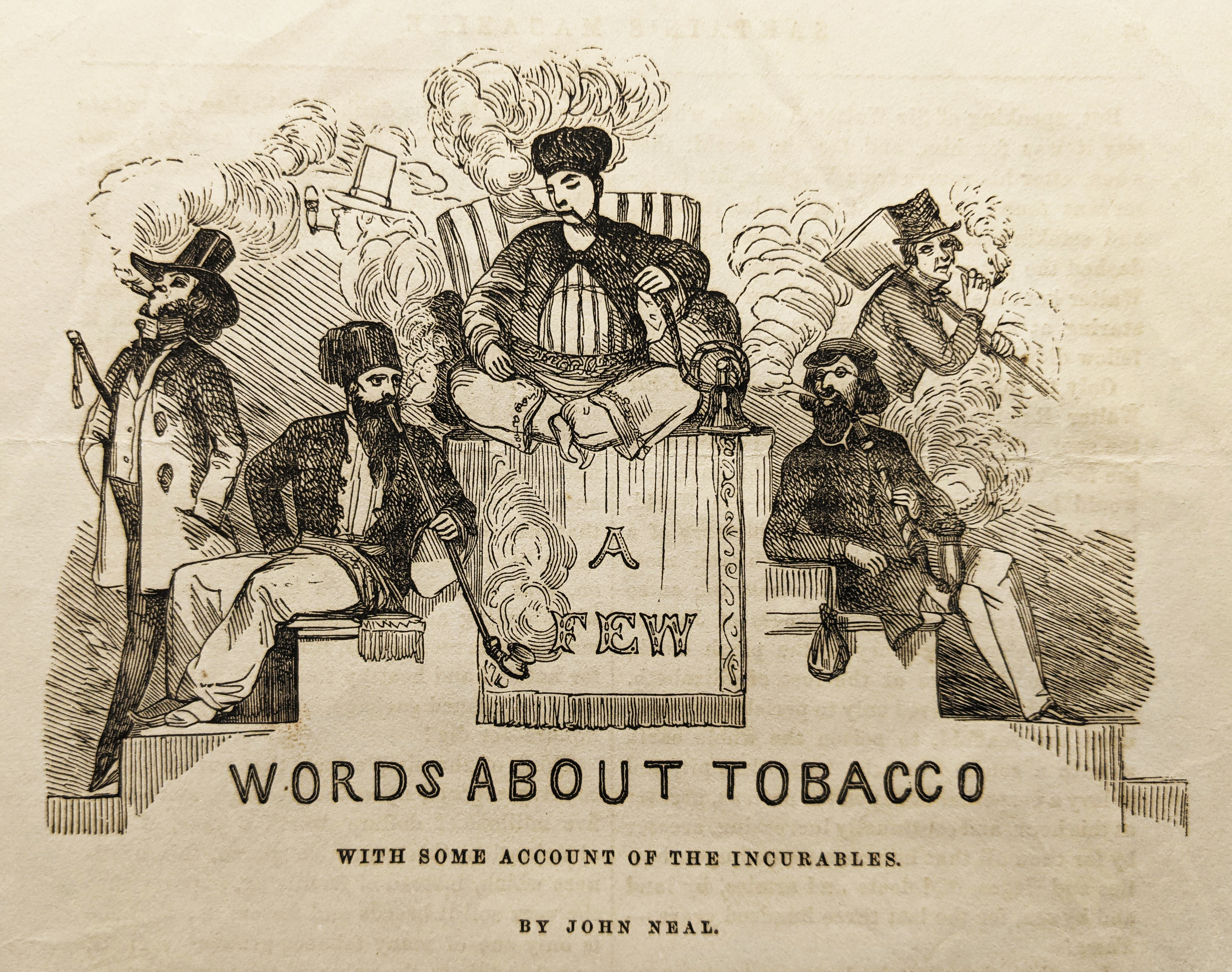
Title image to "A Few Words About Tobacco" (1851)

John Neal was "perhaps the foremost critic of [his] era", commenting on literature, art, drama, politics, and a variety of social issues. As a critic and political commentator, his essays and journalism showed distrust of institutions and an affinity for self-examination and self-reliance. Compared to Neal's comparative lesser success at employing his literary theories in creative works, "his critical judgments have held. Where he condemned, time has almost without exception condemned also." Editors of newspapers, magazines, and annual publications sought contributions from Neal on a wide variety of topics, particularly in the second half of the 1830s. His early articles make him one of the first male advocates of women's rights and feminist causes in the US.

Neal was the first American to be published in any British literary magazine and in that capacity wrote the first history of American literature and American painters. His early encouragement of writers John Greenleaf Whittier, Edgar Allan Poe, Henry Wadsworth Longfellow, Elizabeth Oakes Smith, Nathaniel Hawthorne, and many others, helped launch their careers. As an art critic Neal was the first in the US, and his essays from the 1820s are recognized as "prophetic". As an "early firebrand" in theatrical criticism, his "prophesy" for American drama was only partially realized sixty years later.

This list includes only articles that have received the most scholarly attention and/or that are noted in scholarly works as particularly important milestones in Neal's career and/or the histories of the topics they cover. Those omitted here are included in the larger list of articles by John Neal.

Selected articles by John Neal
Title	Date	Publication type	Publication name	Topic	Notes	Ref.
"Apostasy"	April 27, 1814	Newspaper	Hallowell Gazette	Law and politics	Neal's first published work: a political essay published when Neal was living in Hallowell, Maine, as a penmanship instructor	
"Criticism. Lord Byron"	October 1816, November 1816, December 1816, and January 1817	Magazine	The Portico	Literary criticism	A 150-page criticism of Lord Byron's works written in four days and published in four installments; Neal's first published literary criticism	
"Essay on Duelling"	February 1817	Magazine	The Portico	Social criticism	"Describes dueling as a gendered performance, in which women play an enabling role and which they have an obligation to stop", similar to his subsequent novel, Keep Cool	
"Sketches of the Five American Presidents, and of the Five Presidential Candidates, from the Memoranda of a Traveller"	May 1824	Magazine	Blackwood's Edinburgh Magazine	Biography	Biographical sketches of George Washington, John Adams, Thomas Jefferson, James Madison, James Monroe, John C. Calhoun, John Quincy Adams, Andrew Jackson, William H. Crawford, and Henry Clay; the first article by an American to appear in a British literary journal; republished in four languages by Alexander Walker in The European Review: or, Mind and its Productions, in Britain, France, Italy, Germany, &c. the same year	
"North America. Peculiarities. State of the Fine Arts. Painting."	August 1824	Magazine	Blackwood's Edinburgh Magazine	Art criticism	The first published history of American painting; excerpted in Observations on American Art: Selections from the Writings of John Neal (1793–1876) (1943); a critique of cultivation of fine arts in the US and a discussion of eleven American artists, including Benjamin West and John Trumbull; republished in the Columbian Observer (multiple issues beginning November 17, 1824)	
American Writers	September 1824, October 1824, November 1824, January 1825, February 1825	Magazine	Blackwood's Edinburgh Magazine	Literary criticism	Criticism of 135 American authors in five installments; the earliest written history of American literature; reprinted as a collection in American Writers: A Series of Papers Contributed to Blackwood's Magazine (1824-1825) (1937); excerpted in The Genius of John Neal: Selections from His Writings (1978)	
"Men and Women; Brief Hypothesis concerning the Difference in their Genius"	October 1824	Magazine	Blackwood's Edinburgh Magazine	Feminism and women's rights	An exploration of how women are unlike, but not inferior, to men	
"A Summary View of America"	December 1824	Magazine	Blackwood's Edinburgh Magazine	Multiple	Purportedly a review of A Summary View of America by Isaac Candler "literally buried beneath the grasping tendrils and riotous fruitage of Neal's birthright knowledge of his native country" in a "vast panorama" conveying Neal's views on slavery and other topics in thirty-six pages that "should be read by anyone interested in the America of 1825"; the longest article Blackwood's had yet published; includes Neal's first call for women's suffrage	
"Late American Books. 1. Peep at the Pilgrims; 2. Lionel Lincoln; 3. Memoirs of Charles Brockden Brown; 4. John Bull in America; 5. The Refugee; 6. North American Review, No. XLVI"	September 1825	Magazine	Blackwood's Edinburgh Magazine	Literary criticism	A review of North American Review and new American literature including Lionel Lincoln; predicts a new American revolution against "literary, not political bondage"; republished in American Writers: A Series of Papers Contributed to Blackwood's Magazine (1824–1825) (1937); excerpted in The Genius of John Neal: Selections from His Writings (1978)	
"United States"	January 1826	Magazine	Westminster Review	Social criticism	A summary of Neal's views on the American militia system, slavery, legal system, and literary style	
"Yankee Notions"	April, May, and June 1826	Magazine	The London Magazine	Travel	An account of Neal's departure from Baltimore, transatlantic journey, early impressions of England over late 1823 through early 1824, and contrasts between the UK and US; the most detailed account of Neal's reasons for leaving Baltimore and for relocating to London; published in three installments	
"Rights of Women. Review of the Mayor's Report — so far as it relates to the High School for Girls. By E. BAILEY, late Master of that School. Boston. BOWLES & DEARBORN"	March 5, 1829	Magazine	The Yankee	Feminism and women's rights	Denounces "with considerable heat" Josiah Quincy III's decision to close the Boston High School for Girls and attacks the legal institution of coverture; includes "Neal's angriest and most assertive feminist claims"	
"American Painters and Painting"	July 1829	Magazine	The Yankee	Art criticism	Criticism of the current state of American art written "with a pungency rare in nineteenth century criticism"; republished in American Art 1700–1960 (1965)	
"The Drama"	July, September, October, November, and December 1829	Magazine	The Yankee	Theatrical criticism	Published in five installments; Neal's most noteworthy work of theatrical criticism; calls for "a revolution that was still in progress sixty years later"; elaborates on points made in the prefaces to Otho (1819) and the second edition of The Battle of Niagara (1819); republished in "Critical Essays and Stories by John Neal" (1962)	
"If E.A.P. of Baltimore"	September 1829	Magazine	The Yankee	Literary criticism	Neal's first criticism of Edgar Allan Poe; referred to by Poe as "the very first words of encouragement I ever remember to have heard"	
"Landscape and Portrait-Painting"	September 1829	Magazine	The Yankee	Art criticism	An "early, unprecedented effort to define a canon of American art"; anticipates John Ruskin's Modern Painters by distinguishing between "things seen by the artist" and "things as they are"; a call for "straightforward realism ... made at the height of the Romantic era"; republished in American Art 1700–1960 (1965)	
"Ambiguities"	December 1829	Magazine	The Yankee	Literary criticism	An analysis of ambiguous and inane qualities in common speech patterns; republished in "Critical Essays and Stories by John Neal" (1962)	
"Children—What Are They?"	1835	Gift book	The Token and Atlantic Souvenir	Children and education	An essay of "considerable popularity and a good deal of republication" and "a sensible, original inquiry into the nature of children"; "the best John Neal has ever written" according to the New-York Mirror; revised and republished in Portland Magazine (April 1, 1835), New England Galaxy (April 18, 1835), Godey's Lady's Book (March 1848 and November 1849), and The Genius of John Neal: Selections from His Writings (1978); excerpted in the New-York Mirror October 18, 1834; excerpted as "Rustic Civility, or Children—What Are They?" in The Ladies' Companion (July 1838); republished as "Children—What Are They Good For?" in Great Mysteries and Little Plagues (1870)	
"Story-Telling"	January 1835	Magazine	The New-England Magazine	Multiple	A discussion of storytelling in paintings by John Wesley Jarvis; acting by James Henry Hackett, Charles Mathews, and George Handel Hill; and oral exchange among strangers aboard American stagecoaches and steamboats; excerpted in the New-York Mirror (April 6, 1839); republished in "Critical Essays and Stories by John Neal" (1962)	
"The Case of Major Mitchell"	January 17, January 24, January 31, February 7, and February 14, 1835	Newspaper	New England Galaxy	Science	An account of Neal's role as the first lawyer to use psychiatric testimony and seek leniency in a US court on account of a defendant's alleged mental defect; published in five installments; reviewed in the Annals of Phrenology (November 1835)	
"Rights of Women: The Substance of a Lecture Delivered by John Neal, at the Tabernacle"	June 17, 1843	Magazine	Brother Jonathan	Feminism and women's rights	Neal's most influential statement on women's rights; lecture originally delivered January 24, 1843 before 3,000 attendees at the Broadway Tabernacle; "a scathing satire", according to the History of Woman Suffrage; republished in The Genius of John Neal: Selections from His Writings (1978)	
"Woman! Letter to Mrs. T. J. Farnham, on the Rights of Women. Being a Reply to her Argument in the Brother Jonathan of June 24th, 1843"	July 15, 1843	Magazine	Brother Jonathan	Feminism and women's rights	Responds to arguments against women's suffrage by Eliza Farnham, prompted by Neal's "Rights of Women" speech on January 24 of that year; "Mrs. Farnham lived long enough to retrace her ground and accept the highest truth", according to the History of Woman Suffrage; republished in The Genius of John Neal: Selections from His Writings (1978)	
"To Mrs. Eliza W. Farnham"	August 5, 1843	Magazine	Brother Jonathan	Feminism and women's rights	Concluding remarks to Eliza Farnham's second essay prompted by Neal's "Rights of Women" speech on January 24 of that year; republished in The Genius of John Neal: Selections from His Writings (1978)	
"Slavery"	January 27, 1844	Newspaper	Portland Tribune	Slavery and race	"Neal's most significant pronouncement" on slavery; repeats arguments made in "A Summary View of America" (1824) and "United States" (1826); argues for gradual emancipation and colonization	
"What is Poetry? And What Is It Good For?"	January 1849	Magazine	Sartain's Union Magazine of Literature and Art	Literature	Asserts that all are poets though few recognize it in themselves; claims poetry as a necessary refinement and embellishment of the world; marks a departure from Neal's earlier opinion of poetry as "superficial adornment" and "deliberate falsification of fact"; republished in "Critical Essays and Stories by John Neal" (1962)	
"Edgar A. Poe"	March 19 and April 26, 1850	Newspaper	Portland Daily Advertiser	Biography	A refutation of Rufus Wilmot Griswold's biography of Edgar Allan Poe in two installments; republished in The Genius of John Neal: Selections from His Writings (1978)	
"Thinking Aloud; or, Suggestions and Glimpses"	August 1852	Magazine	Sartain's Union Magazine of Literature and Art	English language	Uplifts the value of natural diction in writing and expression of thought as it spontaneously occurs to the writer; includes an analysis of New England speech and character he saw as underrepresented in literature; republished in The Genius of John Neal: Selections from His Writings (1978)	
"Masquerading"	March 1864	Magazine	The Northern Monthly	Feminism and women's rights	"One of the most interesting essays of his career"; "an incisive piece of feminist social criticism" disguised "as a conservative critique of current fashion"; "the beginning of the last phase of Neal's feminist journalism"	
"Our Painters"	December 1868 and March 1869	Magazine	Atlantic Monthly	Art criticism	Republished in Observations on American Art: Selections from the Writings of John Neal (1793-1876) (1943); based on notes from his stay in London over forty years earlier; published in two installments	
"Portland Up, and Moving"	May 5, 1870	Newspaper	The Revolution	Feminism and women's rights	A report of Portland, Maine's first women's suffrage meeting, organized by Neal; republished in History of Woman Suffrage volume 3 (1886)	

== Short stories and fictional sketches ==
Called "the inventor of the American short story", John Neal's tales are "his highest literary achievement" and he published an average of one per year between 1828 and 1846. Many of them challenged American socio-political phenomena that grew in the period leading up to and including Andrew Jackson's terms as US president (1829–1837): manifest destiny, empire building, Indian removal, consolidation of federal power, racialized citizenship, and the Cult of Domesticity. His work helped shape the relatively new short story genre, particularly early children's literature.

Short stories and fictional sketches by John Neal
Title	Date	Publication type	Publication name	Notes	Ref.
"Albert and Jessy"	Between December 1815 and June 1816	Newspaper	The Wanderer	A "narrative fragment"; originally prepared for recitation at the Wanderer Club of Baltimore; published in volume I, pp. 394–395	
"The Club Room. To Horace De Monde, Esq."	February 1817	Magazine	The Portico	Neal's only contribution to the magazine's regular "Club-Room" department, supervised by the fictitious "Horace De Monde, Esquire" that detailed happenings at real and fictitious clubs; attributed to the pseudonym "Jamie"; "shows a good grasp of character"	
"Original Letter"	April 1817	Magazine	The Portico	A satirical letter from a fictitious author to a fictitious recipient outlining the peculiarities of Boston; possibly a precursor to Neal's novel Randolph	
"Sketches from Nature — By a club of Painters"	May, June, July–August, November, and December 1817	Magazine	The Portico	A series of five character sketches (four women and one man) published over five issues; a study of human nature that contributed to Neal's first novel, Keep Cool	
"Original Letters. Letter I. From J.N. Esquire, to T.S."	June 1817	Magazine	The Portico	A satirical letter from a fictitious author to a fictitious recipient discussing a fictitious "Miss Olivia Teaseabit", possibly based on a real "Miss Olivia T.", with whom Neal had become infatuated after encountering her in Exeter, New Hampshire, and Waterville, Maine, over the winter of 1813–1814	
"A Head"	December 1817	Magazine	The Portico	A character sketch "more penetrating and expository" than his "Sketches from Nature — By a club of Painters" series, likely based on himself	
"Frank and George"	April–June 1818	Magazine	The Portico	A dual sketch contrasting two characters; likely used later by Neal as the basis for the Oadley brothers in his novel Seventy-Six	
"Anecdote"	March 9, March 10, March 23, April 13, April 14, April 22, and April 24, 1819	Newspaper	Federal Republican and Baltimore Telegraph	A series of narrative sketches with distinct subtitles: "More Dogs", "Fact", "Cats", and "Joe Miller"	
"Sketches from Life"	1828–1829	Magazine	The Yankee	"Fragmentary and unsatisfactory" fictional segments likely drawn from an early draft of Brother Jonathan (1825); published in eleven installments	
"Otter-Bag, the Oneida Chief"	1829	Gift book	The Token	Along with "David Whicher" (1832), one of Neal's best short stories; republished in Stories of American Life; By American Writers edited by Mary Russell Mitford (1830), "Critical Essays and Stories by John Neal" (1962), and The Genius of John Neal: Selections from His Writings (1978); excerpted as "Ruins of North America" in The Literary Gazette of Concord, New Hampshire (March 6, 1835)	
"Chalk Drawings No I. Old Bailey — England"	1829	Magazine	The Yankee	A narrative comical sketch of a criminal trial; likely written while Neal lived in London; republished in The Ladies' Companion as "The Prisoner at the Old Bailey" (May 1838)	
"Males and Females"	April 9, 1829	Magazine	The Yankee	A fictional fragment likely from an early draft of Brother Jonathan (1825) that muses about the differences between men and women in a way similar to "Men and Women; Brief Hypothesis concerning the Difference in their Genius" (October 1824)	
"The Spare-Chapter"	1829	Magazine	The Yankee	A fictional fragment of "meaningless nonsense" likely drawn from an early draft of Brother Jonathan (1825)	
"What is Courage"	1829	Magazine	The Yankee	A fictional fragment of "meaningless nonsense" likely drawn from an early draft of Brother Jonathan (1825)	
"Intercepted Letters — No 1"	1829	Magazine	The Yankee	A fictional fragment of "meaningless nonsense" likely drawn from an early draft of Brother Jonathan (1825)	
"Live Yankees — No 1"	1829	Magazine	The Yankee	A fictional fragment of "meaningless nonsense" likely drawn from an early draft of Brother Jonathan (1825)	
"Street Scenes — No 1"	1829	Magazine	The Yankee	A fictional fragment of "meaningless nonsense" likely drawn from an early draft of Brother Jonathan (1825)	
"Live Yankees"	July and August 1829	Magazine	The Yankee	A winter recreation scene along the Kennebec River in Maine during the winter of 1815–1816 followed by an exchange between an American and an Englishman in England in 1827 involving counterfeit money; likely semi-autobiographical; "the only piece of pure, unified, prose fiction Neal published in the Yankee"; published in two installments	
"Courtship"	September 1829	Magazine	The Yankee	"Though too slight for special commendation, it is not ungracefully done"; republished as "The Old Bachelor" in The Ladies' Companion (February 1838), Boston Pearl and Galaxy (February 17, 1838), and the Portland Transcript (July 1, 1848)	
"The Utilitarian"	1830	Gift book	The Token	Reprinted serially in The Free Enquirer on January 15 and January 22, 1831	
"The Adventurer"	1831	Gift book	The Token	A fictionalized story of the life of John Dunn Hunter based mostly on knowledge gained during cohabitation at a rooming house in London in the mid 1820s	
"Old Susap"	July 25, 1831	Newspaper	Morning Courier and New-York Enquirer	A comic tall tale from an "unconsciously ludicrous Down Easter"	
"The Haunted Man"	1832	Gift book	The Atlantic Souvenir	The first work of fiction to utilize psychotherapy	
"David Whicher"	1832	Gift book	The Token	Along with "Otter-Bag, the Oneida Chief" (1832), one of Neal's best short stories; published anonymously and not attributed to Neal until the 1960s; republished in "Critical Essays and Stories by John Neal" (1962) and The Genius of John Neal: Selections from His Writings (1978)	
"Bill Frazier—the Fur Trader"	1833	Novel	The Down-Easters, &c. &c. &c.	Along with "Robert Steele", one of two stories included with The Downeasters to take up space at the request of the publisher	
"Robert Steele"	1833	Novel	The Down-Easters, &c. &c. &c.	Republished in Mrs. Stephens' Illustrated New Monthly (February 1857); along with "Bill Frazier—the Fur Trader", one of two stories included with The Downeasters to take up space at the request of the publisher	
"The Squatter"	February 1835	Magazine	The New-England Magazine	"Ostensibly a string of three stories to illustrate the quick destructive power of the Maine forest fire; republished in the New England Galaxy (February 7, 1835), The Literary Gazette of Concord, New Hampshire (February 13, 1835), and The Genius of John Neal: Selections from His Writings (1978)	
"Will the Wizard"	March 1835	Magazine	The New-England Magazine	A story about young William Shakespeare	
"Hands Off! A Phrenological Case"	March 14, 1835	Newspaper	New England Galaxy	About an Englishman in Virginia who claims his head is so beautifully shaped he wears hats and wigs to hide it from phrenologists like Neal and John Elliotson who want to examine him to no end, though he contemplated offering his head for dissection by Johann Spurzheim for examination by John Pierpont; "aside from the evidence it affords of Neal's ability to laugh at what he took most seriously, this piece has little or no significance"	
"Heads and Points"	April 4, April 11, April 25, May 23, July 19, and August 8, 1835	Newspaper	New England Galaxy	A series of six fictional sketches illustrating New England dialect and character	
"The Story of E.B."	April 25, May 9, May 30, June 27, and August 1, 1835	Newspaper	New England Galaxy	Based on Neal's travels in England; similar to the novel Authorship; published serially in five installments	
"Phantasmagoria — Little Joe Smith"	June 27, 1835	Newspaper	New England Galaxy	Illustrates Neal's opposition to dueling	
"The Old Pussy-Cat and the Two Little Pussy-Cats"	August 29, 1835	Newspaper	New England Galaxy	A children's story concerning a cat who protects her noisy kittens from a human child; prefaced by a statement that Neal intends "to furnish a series of the best little books for children that ever appeared"	
"The Life and Adventures of Tom Pop"	August 29, September 12, September 19, and September 26, 1835	Newspaper	New England Galaxy	A children's story concerning a homeless orphan reunited with his grandfather who is rewarded for honesty and courage; published serially in four installments	
"Extracts from the Autobiography of a Coward"	October 17 and November 28, 1835	Newspaper	New England Galaxy	Two reworked extracts from Errata	
"Extracts from the 'Autobiography of John Dunn Hunter'"	December 19, 1835	Newspaper	New England Galaxy	Likely portions of "The Adventurer" rejected by The Token	
"The Young Phrenologist"	1836	Gift book	The Token and Atlantic Souvenir	Republished in The New England Galaxy October 3, 1835, in Atkinson's Casket in 1838, and in Emerson's United States Magazine and Putnam's Monthly September 1857	
"The Unchangeable Jew"	1836	Book	Portland Sketch Book	Included in a book edited by Ann S. Stephens featuring Portland, Maine authors	
"Animal Magnetism"	February 9 February 16, February 23, March 2, March 9, and March 16, 1839	Newspaper	The New-York Mirror	Published serially over six installments; a study of female development from adolescence to womanhood; includes a character who becomes magnetized	
"Goody Gracious! and the Forget-Me-Not"	March 23, 1839	Newspaper	The New-York Mirror	A children's story written for Neal's daughter, Margaret Neal; republished in Ballou's Monthly Magazine in 1866, Great Mysteries and Little Plagues (book) by Neal in 1870, and Little Classics (book) edited by Rossiter Johnson in 1875	
"New-England Witchcraft"	April 20, April 27, May 4, May 11, and May 18, 1839	Newspaper	The New-York Mirror	Published serially over five issues; likely written for but never published by Blackwood's Magazine in 1825 and later expanded into Rachel Dyer (1828)	
"The Newly Married Man"	May 1839	Magazine	The Ladies' Companion	"A highly artificial, melodramatic sketch, cast so exclusively into dialogue as to be almost dramatic in effect"; first of three works in the "Sketches by Lamp-Light" series for The Ladies' Companion	
"The Three Caps"	July 1839	Magazine	The Ladies' Companion	Based on Neal's family life; third of three works in the "Sketches by Lamp-Light" series for The Ladies' Companion	
"The Runaway"	September 1839	Magazine	Godey's Lady's Book	Based on Neal's experience living with Jeremy Bentham in London in August 1826	
"The Instinct of Childhood"	1840	Book	The Envoy. From Free Hearts to the Free	Written for a collection of anti-slavery prose and poetry edited by Frances Harriet Whipple Green McDougall and published by the Juvenile Emancipation Society; republished in the Portland Tribune circa 1841; republished in The Star of Bethlehem (1845)	
"Coming Out"	January 18, 1840	Newspaper	The New World	"A countryman's farcical account ... of his appearance at his first ball"; republished in The Evergreen: A Monthly Magazine of New and Popular Tales and Poetry February 1840	
"The Tragedy of Errors; or Facts Stranger than Fiction"	February 15, 1840	Newspaper	The New World	Intended to be titled "The Self-educated Man" by Neal, but retitled by editor Park Benjamin Sr.; roughly based on Neal's travels in the UK "woven in a bizarre plot involving disastrous elopement and a suicide"; republished in The New World (February 24, 1840) and The Evergreen: A Monthly Magazine of New and Popular Tales and Poetry (March 1840)	
"Live Women!"	May 2, 1840	Magazine	Brother Jonathan	"A preposterous bit of tomfoolery" written to accompany an illustration	
"The Ins and the Outs, or the Last of the Bamboozled. By a Disappointed Man"	October 15, 1841	Magazine	The Family Companion and Ladies' Mirror: A Monthly Magazine of Polite Literature	An "expression of contempt for politics" based on Neal's involvement in the Benjamin Harrison's 1840 presidential campaign and subsequent failed attempt at securing a political appointment	
"The Countess of Beltokay"	November 15, 1841; December 15, 1841; and January 15, 1842	Magazine	The Family Companion and Ladies' Mirror: A Monthly Magazine of Polite Literature	"Shows a lively crispness that contrasts with the lumbering involutions of Neal's usual long, closely packed, rambling sentences"; three sketches of disparate scenes in Austria-Hungary "bound together by explanatory threads"; published in three installments	
"A Yankee in Paris"	November 20, 1841	Newspaper	Portland Tribune	A New Englander's visit to the French theatre; "shows Neal's usual facility in Yankee dialect and Yankee psychology"	
"The Switch-Tail Pacer. A Tale of Other Days"	December 4, 18, and 25, 1841	Magazine	Brother Jonathan	The story of Nathan Hale "with many variations and considerable subordination of historical fact"; published serially over three installments	
"Mary Bishop, or the Transformation"	February 15, 1842	Magazine	The Family Companion and Ladies' Mirror: A Monthly Magazine of Polite Literature	Takes its title from Lord Byron's The Deformed Transformed; "advances the notion ... that a beautiful soul may inhabit an unlovely body"; "a careless, perfunctory performance"	
"Little Joe Junk and the Fisherman's Daughter"	March 12 and 19, 1842	Magazine	Brother Jonathan	A children's story, "quite meaningless in its haphazard shiftings", about a young sailor addicted to tobacco and alcohol who experiences a drunken hallucination while shipwrecked; includes an illustration by David Claypoole Johnston published serially in two installments	
"Dot and Carry One"	April 20, 1842	Newspaper	Portland Tribune	"A slapdash attempt to represent New England character without plot — with a mere string of meaningless, illogical incidents" about a schoolmaster correcting mispronunciations of a family he visits	
"The Charcoal-Burners. A Tale"	May 21, June 4, June 11, July 2, July 9, and July 23, 1842	Magazine	Brother Jonathan	"Rhapsodic, deep-dyed, unrelieved Gothicism as he had not perpetrated since Logan"; published serially over six installments	
"The China Pitcher"	April 1843	Magazine	The New Mirror	About a young wife's attachment to family heirlooms; "slight in its conception" and "gives every evidence of a careless preciptancy [sic] in execution"	
"Idiosyncrasies"	May 6 and July 8, 1843	Magazine	Brother Jonathan	"A tale about the madness of patriarchy"; published serially over two installments; republished in The Genius of John Neal: Selections from His Writings (1978)	
"The Lottery Ticket"	June 1843	Magazine	The Magnolia; or, Southern Appalachian	A "pseudo-narrative" that portrays lotteries as an objectionable industry that dupes customers into wasting money	
"Never Give Up! Always Give Up!"	July 1843	Magazine	Pierian: or, Youth's Fountain of Literature and Knowledge	A sketch of a family with children, likely based on Neal's own, followed by a moral statement about when and when not to give up; republished in the Portland Tribune (September 9, 1843)	
"Another Mystery!"	December 23, 1843	Magazine	Brother Jonathan	A "strangely autobiographic" short narrative about an abandoned family with a plot "too complicated for the space allotted it"	
"Lead Us Not into Temptation"	February 1844	Magazine	Columbian Lady's and Gentleman's Magazine	"Warns against over-confidence in human powers"	
"The Little Fat Quakeress; or, Match-Making at Philadelphia"	January 1845	Magazine	Columbian Lady's and Gentleman's Magazine	A feminist defense of unmarried women	
"Budding and Blossoming"	January 1846	Magazine	Godey's Lady's Book	A study of female development from adolescence to womanhood	
"Life Assurance"	January 1846	Magazine	Columbian Lady's and Gentleman's Magazine	Illustrates the value of purchasing life insurance and concludes "P.S. Go thou and do likewise"	
"My Own Life. By Ruth Elder"	July 1, 1848	Newspaper	Portland Transcript	A sequel to the novella Ruth Elder	
"Bubbles"	January 1851	Magazine	Godey's Lady's Book	"A queer hybrid narrative ... with one of Neal's delightful family sketches ... as a symbol of the vanity of life" and a "story of an absurd faith in buried treasures"; republished in the Portland Transcript (December 14, 1850)	
"New Englandisms"	May 1867	Magazine	Beadle's Monthly, a Magazine of To-day	Three story fragments illustrating New England speech and social phenomena based on accompanying engravings: "The Memorial Quilt", "The Apple-Bee", and "The Sewing-Circle"	

== Poems ==
The bulk of Neal's poetry was published in The Portico while studying law in Baltimore in the late 1810s. By 1830 he had "acquired quite a reputation, especially as a poet", having been recognized in multiple poetry collections. Rufus Wilmot Griswold considered Neal one of the best poets of his age.

Collected and uncollected poems by John Neal
Title	Date	Publication type	Publication name	Notes	Ref.
"Passion"	Between December 1815 and June 1816	Newspaper	The Wanderer	Originally prepared for recitation at the Wanderer Club of Baltimore; published in volume I, pp. 174–175	
"Recovery"	Between December 1815 and June 1816	Newspaper	The Wanderer	Originally prepared for recitation at the Wanderer Club of Baltimore; published in volume I, pp. 221–222	
"To Genius"	August 1816	Magazine	The Portico	Shows influence of Lord Byron; republished in Keep Cool (1817)	
"Castle Shane"	August 1816	Magazine	The Portico	Shows influence of Lord Byron; written while Neal was still engaged in dry goods business, at the suggestion of John Pierpont	
"Moonlight"	September 1816	Magazine	The Portico		
"To M. A.———"	September 1816	Magazine	The Portico		
"The Lyre of the Winds"	October 1816	Magazine	The Portico	Shows influence of Lord Byron; republished in The Battle of Niagara: Second Edition — Enlarged: with Other Poems (1819) and in the Portland Tribune (circa 1842)	
"Religion"	November 1816	Magazine	The Portico	Shows influence of Lord Byron; republished in the Portland Tribune (circa 1841)	
"Love's Worst Curse"	November 1816	Magazine	The Portico		
"Expression"	November 1816	Magazine	The Portico	Republished in Randolph (1823), The Yankee (1828), and the Portland Tribune (circa 1841)	
"To Power"	November 1816	Magazine	The Portico	Shows influence of Lord Byron; republished in The Yankee (1828) and the Portland Tribune (circa 1841)	
"The Oak of the Heart"	December 1816	Magazine	The Portico	Republished in the Portland Tribune (circa 1842)	
"To Memory"	January 1817	Magazine	The Portico		
"Song"	January 1817	Magazine	The Portico	Republished in the Portland Tribune (circa 1842); to the tune of "Meeting of the Waters"	
"Fragment in Imitation of Byron"	February 1817	Magazine	The Portico		
"To Doubt"	February 1817	Magazine	The Portico	Republished in the Portland Tribune (circa 1841)	
"Sympathy"	February 1817	Magazine	The Portico	Republished in the Portland Tribune (circa 1842)	
"Song"	February 1817	Magazine	The Portico		
"Impromptu on a sprig of Ambrosia which fell from a Lady's bosom"	February 1817	Magazine	The Portico		
"Ode on the Birth-Day of a Friend"	March 1817	Magazine	The Portico		
"Ambition"	March 1817	Magazine	The Portico	Originally published in The Portico as "Song"; republished in The Battle of Niagara: Second Edition — Enlarged: with Other Poems (1819); revised and republished as "Ambition" in Randolph (1823), Atkinson's Casket (1834), Brother Jonathan (May 2, 1840), The Poet's Gift: Illustrated by One of Her Painters edited by John Keese (1845), and Songs of Three Centuries edited by John Greenleaf Whittier (1877); excerpted in Seventy-Six (1823) and The Gift Book of Gems (1856)	
"Song"	March 1817	Magazine	The Portico	To the tune of "Go Where Glory Waits Thee"	
"To A.M.C."	March 1817	Magazine	The Portico		
"To Romance"	March 1817	Magazine	The Portico	Republished in the Portland Tribune (circa 1842)	
"Fancy"	May 1817	Magazine	The Portico	Republished in Keep Cool (1817)	
"The Sailor's Grave—A Song"	June 1817	Magazine	The Portico	Republished in the Portland Tribune (circa 1841)	
"Song. The Sailor's Pledge,—By the friend of _____, who fell with Lawrence"	June 1817	Magazine	The Portico	"Given special prominence" at the end of volume 3 of The Portico; republished in the Portland Tribune (circa 1842)	
Verse parody addressed to "Mr. Editor"	July–August 1817	Magazine	The Portico		
"Perry's Victory.—A Song"	July–August 1817	Magazine	The Portico	Republished in The Battle of Niagara: Second Edition — Enlarged: with Other Poems (1819);	
"To Byron"	July–August 1817	Magazine	The Portico		
"To Ida"	September–October 1817	Magazine	The Portico		
"To ___ ___ ___"	September–October 1817	Magazine	The Portico		
"Song—The Butterfly God"	September–October 1817	Magazine	The Portico	Republished in the Portland Tribune (circa 1842)	
"To E. M. P."	September–October 1817	Magazine	The Portico	Republished in the Portland Tribune (circa 1841)	
"To William"	December 1817	Magazine	The Portico		
Battle of Niagara	1818	Book	Battle of Niagara, a Poem, without Notes; and Goldau, or the Maniac Harper	Recognized at the time as the best poetic description of Niagara Falls; inspired Charles Naylor as a boy; used by Edward Dickinson Baker in political campaigns; revised and republished in The Battle of Niagara: Second Edition — Enlarged: with Other Poems (1819); excerpted in Lady's Amaranth (December 8, 1838), Brother Jonathan (July 4, 1840), Portland Tribune (circa 1842), The Gift Book of Gems (1856), and A Down-East Yankee from the District of Maine (1920)	
Goldau	1818	Book	Battle of Niagara, a Poem, without Notes; and Goldau, or the Maniac Harper	An epic poem in English verse about the destruction of an Alpine village; revised and republished in The Battle of Niagara: Second Edition — Enlarged: with Other Poems (1819); excerpted in Lady's Amaranth (January 5, 1839) and Portland Tribune (circa 1842)	
"Ode, Delivered Before the Delphians. A Literary Society of Baltimore"	1819	Book	The Battle of Niagara: Second Edition — Enlarged: with Other Poems	Originally written for a Delphian Club meeting (December 26, 1818) as "Ode, alias Poem, on the Anniversary of His Ludships Elevation to the Tripod"	
"Conquest of Peru"	1819	Book	The Battle of Niagara: Second Edition — Enlarged: with Other Poems	A fragmented experiment in blank verse	
"Hymn, (Sung at the late ordination of Mr. Pierpont, in Boston)"	1819	Book	The Battle of Niagara: Second Edition — Enlarged: with Other Poems	Written for the ordination of John Pierpont	
"To the Genius of Painting"	March 16, 1819	Newspaper	Federal Republican and Baltimore Telegraph	Republished in The Battle of Niagara: Second Edition — Enlarged: with Other Poems (1819)	
"Hymn for the Lord's Supper"	1823	Book	Randolph, A Novel	Represented as the work of a fictional character in the novel	
"Poetry, Inclosed to —————"	1823	Book	Randolph, A Novel	Represented as the work of a fictional character in the novel	
"To —————"	1823	Book	Randolph, A Novel	Represented as the work of a fictional character in the novel	
"To —————, The Same, In Atonement"	1823	Book	Randolph, A Novel	Represented as the work of a fictional character in the novel	
"Hymn. Supper"	1823	Book	Randolph, A Novel	Represented as the work of a fictional character in the novel	
"What is an Album?"	1823	Book	Randolph, A Novel	Represented as the work of a fictional character in the novel	
"To —————"	1823	Book	Randolph, A Novel	Represented as the work of a fictional character in the novel	
"The Birth of a Poet"	January 1, 1828	Magazine	The Yankee	Republished in The Edinburgh Literary Journal: or, Weekly Register of Criticism and Belles Lettres (May 16, 1829), Specimens of American Poetry, with Critical and Biographical Notices edited by Samuel Kettell (1829), The Poets of America: Illustrated by One of Her Painters edited by John Keese (1840), The Poets and Poetry of America (1842), The Gift Book of Gems (1856), and Cyclopedia of American Literature (1875)	
"The Indian Girl of Lake Ontario"	February 6, 1828	Magazine	The Yankee	Republished as "The Indian Girl" in The Ladies' Companion (January 1838) and the Portland Tribune (circa 1841)	
"The Sleeper"	April 9, 1828	Book	The Yankee	Republished in Specimens of American Poetry, with Critical and Biographical Notices edited by Samuel Kettell (1829)	
"Preliminary Poem"	September 10, 1828	Magazine	The Yankee		
"Address for the New Year by the Editors of The Yankee and Boston Literary Gazette—Jan.1, 1829"	1829	Magazine	The Yankee	Republished in Specimens of American Poetry, with Critical and Biographical Notices edited by Samuel Kettell (1829), the Portland Tribune (circa 1842), and Brother Jonathan (October 7, 1843)	
"How to Make Poetry"	1829	Magazine	The Yankee		
"Ode to Peace"	1829	Book	Specimens of American Poetry, with Critical and Biographical Notices	Poetry collection edited by Samuel Kettell	
"Stanzas to Woman"	September 1829	Magazine	The Yankee	Republished in the Portland Tribune (circa 1841)	
"A War-Song of the Revolution"	July 1829	Magazine	The Yankee	Republished in The Portland Sketch Book (1836); republished as "War Song of Other Days" in the Evening Signal (April 3, 1840), The New World (April 4, 1840), The Evergreen: A Monthly Magazine of New and Popular Tales and Poetry (May 1840)	
"The Ideot-Boy"	October 1829	Magazine	The Yankee	Republished in Brother Jonathan (August 5, 1843)	
"Language"	1835	Book	Practical Grammar of the English Language	Republished in the Portland Tribune (circa 1841) and One Word More (1854)	
"Shakespeare's Tomb"	March 1835	Magazine	The New-England Magazine	A "once-popular" poem with "vigor and rhetorical apostrophe ... but none of the freshness of diction or image that mark fine poetry"; originally published without a title; republished in the Gift Book of Gems (1856)	
"The Marriage Ring"	October 1, 1835	Magazine	The Portland Magazine, Devoted to Literature	"Marred by graveyard sentimentality" with "at least one effective stanza" that anticipates the "later macabre effects of Poe"	
"Verses Written at Cape Cottage"	December 1838	Magazine	The Ladies' Companion	A ballad about a hotel by that name Neal owned in Cape Elizabeth, Maine; republished in the Portland Tribune (circa 1842) and The New World (January 14, 1843),	
"Verses to her who will Understand Them"	April 4, 1840	Newspaper	The New World	Republished in The Evergreen: A Monthly Magazine of New and Popular Tales and Poetry (May 1840), the Portland Tribune (circa 1842), and Brother Jonathan (June 24, 1843)	
"One Day in the History of the World"	October 15, 1841	Magazine	The Family Companion, and Ladies' Mirror		
"Bunker Hill"	circa 1842	Newspaper	Portland Tribune		
"To ———"	circa 1842	Newspaper	Portland Tribune		
"Stanzas"	circa 1842	Newspaper	Portland Tribune		
"Where Are They?"	circa 1842	Newspaper	Portland Tribune	Republished in Alexander's Whig Messenger (November 9, 1842)	
"A Pair of Verses"	circa 1842	Newspaper	Portland Tribune		
"Washingtonian (Written for a Tea-Party) Your Father is a Man Again"	circa 1842	Newspaper	Portland Tribune		
"The Dying Husband to His Wife"	January 15, 1842	Magazine	The Family Companion, and Ladies' Mirror	Republished in Emerson's United States Magazine December 1856	
"Polsko Powstan"	March 15, 1842	Magazine	The Family Companion, and Ladies' Mirror	Republished in Brother Jonathan magazine April 30, 1842	
"The Birth of Woman"	May 13, 1843	Magazine	Brother Jonathan		
"To a Friend: On the Birth of Her First Child"	November 4, 1843	Magazine	Brother Jonathan		
"My Child! My Child!"	1847	Gift book	The Mayflower	Inspired by the death of Neal's infant daughter Eleanor in 1845.	
"Inscription"	1851	Book	The Memorial: Written by the Friends of the Late Mrs. Osgood	Printed in the front of a memorial book in honor of Frances Sargent Osgood	
"The Pledge"	March 1852	Magazine	Graham's Magazine	Republished in the Portland Tribune (circa 1842)	
"Almighty God! Jehovah! Father! Friend!"	1854	Book	One Word More: Intended for the Reasoning and Thoughtful among Unbelievers		
"Patience"	January 1855	Newspaper	The Una: A Paper Devoted to the Elevation of Woman		
"Three Hundred Thousand Strong"	January 1864	Magazine	Harper's Magazine	Inspired by the Civil War; appears with the date "Nov. 9, 1863"	
"Battle Shadows No. 1 — The Boy-Trooper"	March 1864	Magazine	The Northern Monthly	Inspired by the Civil War; appears with the date "January 28, 1864"	
"Our Battle Flag—Hurrah!"	July 1864	Magazine	The Northern Monthly	Inspired by the Civil War	
"The Silent Gathering"	June 1866	Magazine	Beadle's Monthly, a Magazine of To-day	Blank verse; about the return of Jews to Jerusalem	

== Other ==
=== Drama ===
Neither of Neal's two fully conceived plays, nor his theatrical sketch, were ever produced for the stage.

Theatrical works by John Neal
Title	Date	Publication type	First publisher	Notes	Ref.
Otho: A Tragedy, in Five Acts	1819	Book	Boston: West, Richardson and Lord	Written in blank verse poetry; entirely rewritten and republished serially in thirteen installments in The Yankee (1828)	
Sketch for a Fifth Act	1829	Magazine	The Yankee	A theatrical fragment of a tragedy about a duel; all three characters die	
Our Ephraim, or The New Englanders, A What-d'ye-call-it?–in three Acts	May 16, May 23, May 30, June 3, and June 13, 1835	Magazine	New England Galaxy	Published serially over five issues of New England Galaxy; the "fullest detailing of Yankee dialect" of any work by Neal	

=== Translations ===
Neal was fluent in French and able to easily converse and write in Spanish, Italian, and German. In addition, he "could manage ... pretty well" writing and reading Portuguese, Swedish, Danish, Hebrew, Latin, Greek, and Old Saxon. He learned to read Chinese shortly before his death.

Translations by John Neal
Title	Author	Date	Publication type	First publisher	Original language	Notes	Ref.
"Morals and Legislation"	Étienne Dumont and Jeremy Bentham	July 2, 1828 – May 1829	Magazine	The Yankee	French	A work on utilitarianism by Jeremy Bentham; published in eighteen installments	
"Principles of the Civil Code"	Étienne Dumont and Jeremy Bentham	June 18, 1829	Magazine	The Yankee	French	A work on utilitarianism by Jeremy Bentham	
Principles of Legislation: from the MS of Jeremy Bentham	Étienne Dumont and Jeremy Bentham	1830	Book	Boston: Wells and Lilly	French	A translation of the first part of the first volume of Traités de Législation; originally produced under promise of payment from John Bowring, but published elsewhere when Bowring's funding failed to materialize; much of the content originally published in The Yankee (1828–1829); includes short biographies by Neal of Jeremy Bentham and Étienne Dumont	
The Wandering Piper	José Cortes	February 1834	Manuscript	Never published	Spanish	An unpublished play El Gaytero Errante by a Spanish instructor from Spain Neal met in Portland, Maine; Thomas Barry, manager of the Tremont Theatre in Boston, committed to producing it but never did; Barry claimed to have returned the manuscript to Cortes and Neal claimed Barry kept it	
"Principles of Legislation: from the MS of Jeremy Bentham"	Étienne Dumont and Jeremy Bentham	January 17, January 31, March 21, April 4, April 11, April 18, April 25, May 30, June 13, July 4, September 19, October 10, and November 21, 1835	Newspaper	New England Galaxy	French	A translation of the first part of the second volume of Traites de Legislation; published in thirteen installments	
Koenig Yngurd	Adolph Muellner	January 24, 1835	Newspaper	New England Galaxy	German	Excerpts from a poem	
"From the 'Traites De Legislation, Civile Et Penale,'—Part of Chapter XV. Vol I"	Étienne Dumont and Jeremy Bentham	August 5, 1843	Magazine	Brother Jonathan	French	A translation of a portion of the fifteenth chapter of Traités de Législation	

=== Newspapers for which Neal wrote ===
Neal started writing for newspapers as a law apprentice, publishing legal papers on capital punishment, lotteries, insolvency law, imprisonment for debt, and Sturges v. Crowninshield. These early works put him in the public eye nationally for the first time. Throughout his life he was widely recognized as a journalist and he continued publishing in newspapers until near the end of his life.

This list includes newspapers not listed elsewhere in this bibliography.

Newspapers for which John Neal wrote
Title	Located	Period	Ref.
Hallowell Gazette	Hallowell, Maine	April 27, 1814	
Columbian Centinel	Boston	August 16, 1817	
Federal Republican and Baltimore Telegraph	Baltimore	1817–1822	
Morning Chronicle	Baltimore	1819–1822	
Federal Gazette and Baltimore Daily Advertiser	Baltimore	1820–1823	
American and Commercial Daily Advertiser	Baltimore	1822	
Baltimore Patriot and Mercantile Advertiser	Baltimore	1822	
Columbian Observer	Philadelphia	1822–1823	
National Journal	Washington, D.C.	1823	
The Morning Chronicle	London	January 27, 1826	
Morning Herald	London	1827	
Portland Daily Advertiser	Portland, Maine	1829–1876	
Morning Courier and New-York Enquirer	New York City	1831–1838	
The Sun	New York City	1836 and April 1843 – September 1844	
National Intelligencer	Washington, D.C.	December 14, 1839	
The Evening Signal	New York City	January–April 1840	
Eastern Argus	Portland, Maine	January 24 and April 17, 1840	
Portland Tribune	Portland, Maine	1841–1845	
Public Ledger	Philadelphia	January 13, 1844	
Portland Transcript	Portland, Maine	1848–1876	
The State of Maine	Portland, Maine	1853–1855	
Portland Daily Press	Portland, Maine	August 14, 1873	
