= Seth Luther =

American antebellum workers' and suffrage organizer

- Born: 1795; Providence, Rhode Island
- Died: April 29, 1863 (aged 67-68); Brattleboro, Vermont
- Known for: Union organizer

Seth Luther (1795 – April 29, 1863) was an American antebellum workers' and suffrage organizer based in Providence, Rhode Island. A carpenter by trade, Luther was renowned in his time for his oratorical skills and early work to organize workers into trade unions in the New England area. He was a key player in Rhode Island's Dorr Rebellion of 1842, where the working people of Rhode Island took up arms in an ill-fated crusade to expand voting to non-property holding men. Later in life, he was arrested and institutionalized after trying to rob a bank in the name of American President James K. Polk. He died in the Brattleboro Asylum on April 29, 1863. In 2001, the Rhode Island Heritage Society inducted Luther into its Hall of Fame in recognition of his pioneering work on behalf of union organizing in Rhode Island.

== Early life ==
Seth Luther was born in 1795 the son of a revolutionary war veteran Thomas Luther and his wife Rebecca. In 1815, Luther was baptized and became a member of the First Baptist Church of Providence, the same church founded by the city's founder, Roger Williams. Two years later in 1817, Luther left Rhode Island and traveled to the frontier of the young country, providing him with stories that would punctuate his speeches on the rights of working people throughout the years to come. When he returned to Providence, and in July 1824, he was voted out of membership in the First Baptist Church on a charge of "Disorderly Walking".

== "It is the first duty of an American citizen to hate injustice in all its forms." ==
During most of the 1830s, Luther worked for a variety of emerging workingmen's trade unions in the New England area as an organizer, pamphleteer, and orator. Three notable speeches of the decade are his "Address on the Right of Free Suffrage" delivered in Providence, Rhode Island, 1833; "An Address on the Origins of Avarice" delivered at a union meeting in Charlestown, Massachusetts, 1834, and; "An Address before the Mechanics and Working-Men of the City of Brooklyn of the Sixtieth Anniversary of American Independence". His speeches were also littered with biblical references. The "Avarice" address highlights the contradictions for Luther in the emerging capitalism of the American economy and the professed Christian ideals of the country. Echoing the Gospel of Mathew, Chapter 6, verse 24, Luther says to his audience:

"For we have seen many who profess to have their treasure in heaven, grasping with intense desire the world, the world, the world; and it seems that the nearer they get to the earth, the closer they hug it. Such persons give no evidence whatever of being what they profess to be, followers of him who has said, 'Ye cannot serve God and Mammon. "

In his 1836 "Mechanics" address, Luther references the Old Testament prophet Micah (See Micah 6:8) when he tells his audience:

"It is the first duty of an American citizen to hate injustice in all its forms; then he we be prepared to do justly, love mercy, and walk as he ought to walk in the sight of God and Man."

== "Peaceably if we can. Forcibly if we must!" ==
The terrible working conditions of American workers were not the only thing Luther directed his organizing focus towards. The noted historian Louis Hartz described in a 1940 biographical essay on Luther how Rhode Island was "a place and time suitable indeed for the growth of a working-class radical" because "parallel with his attack on the social abuses of the new capitalism ran Luther's militant drive to reform the last outpost of reaction in the sphere of suffrage, his own state of Rhode Island." Property ownership was still a test for voting, disqualifying masses of workers from the ballot box. This led Luther to combine his worker organizing efforts with the efforts of suffrage activists across the state of Rhode Island.

In 1841, while delivering a speech in Newport, Luther is reported to have delivered his most famous slogan to assembled crowd. He told the audience that the vote would be extended "Peaceably if we can, forcibly if we must," which the New Age Constitution and Advocate at the time reported was met with hissing from the "lordly landholders and noted aristocrats."

== Participation in the Dorr Rebellion ==
Luther's 1841 remarks foreshadowed what came to be known as the Dorr Rebellion in Rhode Island in 1842. Luther was part of Thomas Dorr's ill-fated attempt to seize power in Rhode Island by attacking the state arsenal. When the cannon the Dorr forces were attempting to use in the insurrection failed to fire, the forces of the uprising scattered. Luther was eventually captured and imprisoned. He made an unsuccessful escape attempt by setting his prison bedding on fire, but was eventually released in 1843 by a conservative government eager to put the insurrection behind them.

== Last years ==
After his release from prison, Luther embarked on a speaking tour about the rebellion and about the Ten-Hour Movement, but by 1846, his mental state was failing ". After writing a letter to President James K. Polk offering his services in the Mexican War, Luther was arrested for robbing a bank in the words of one local newspaper "demanded a thousand dollars in the name of President Polk." ". He was committed to an institution in East Cambridge, moved to the Dexter Asylum in Providence, the Butler Hospital, and eventually to the Vermont Asylum (now the Brattleboro Retreat ) where he died in 1863. He was buried in an unmarked grave.

== See also ==
- Stephen Simpson (writer), outspoken contemporary of Seth, also critical of labor abuses, especially in connection with monopolies and banking practices.
