= American literary nationalism =

Literary movement in the United States in the early-to mid 19th century

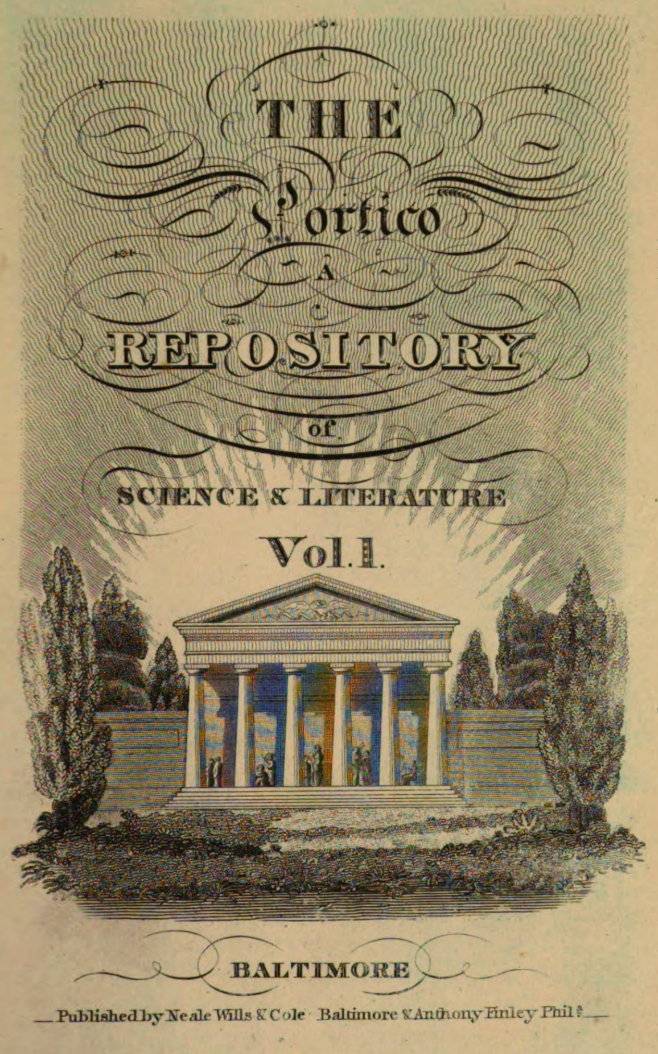
The Portico magazine, an early tool of literary nationalist critics

American literary nationalism was a literary movement in the United States in the early-to mid 19th century, which consisted of American authors working towards the development of a distinct American literature. Literary figures such as Henry Wadsworth Longfellow, William Cullen Bryant and William Ellery Channing advocated the creation of a definitively American form of literature with emphasis "on spiritual values and social usefulness." Longfellow wrote that "when we say that the literature of a country is national, we mean that it bears upon it the stamp of national character." Many authors of the time also advocated tying the literature to religion. These demands were also couched in a perceived contrast between the English author as a "well-off amateur writer ... who writes in his spare time for personal amusement" and the American as a "professional author, writing out of economic necessity".

== Aftermath of the War of 1812 ==
The predominant rhetoric of early post-War of 1812 literary nationalists advocated more expansive treatment of American characters, settings, and events, but expressed with a morality and style that matched British conventions. Critic and author John Neal was unique in this early period for demanding and experimenting with natural diction and "ungenteel and sometimes bluntly profane" American colloquialism. The predominant early rhetoric is exemplified by James Fenimore Cooper, who in 1828 claimed that "the literature of England and that of America must be fashioned after the same models." A forerunner of later American voices, Neal expressed the same year in the "Unpublished Preface" to Rachel Dyer that "to succeed...[the American writer] must resemble nobody...[he] must be unlike all that have gone before [him]" and issue "another Declaration of Independence, in the great Republic of Letters."

== Literary nationalist criticism ==
The Portico magazine under Stephen Simpson and Tobias Watkins played an important early role in promoting literary nationalist criticism by Neal and others during its two-year run 1816–1818. In January 1820, English critic Sydney Smith quipped in the Edinburgh Review "In the four-quarters of the globe, who reads an American book?". James Kirke Paulding issued a scathing reply later that year in the Salmagundi, calling for the US to develop its own rival literature that abandons "servile imitation" of British precedent. Smith's quip also inspired Neal to pursue a career in British literary journals. From London, he wrote the American Writers series (1824–25) for Blackwood's Edinburgh Magazine, in which he declared the US had not yet developed its own literary voice, but could with the right encouragement. Such advocacy in newspapers and magazines became more fashionable after 1830.

== Literary magazines and impact of the movement ==
The United States Magazine and Democratic Review under John L. O'Sullivan was a highly successful journal in the 1830s that published many American authors. O'Sullivan wrote in the magazine's first issue that "we have no national literature ... the vital principal of an American national literature must be democracy." He continued to say that "the voice of America might be made to produce a powerful and beneficial effect on the development of truth." In 1847, The Literary World was founded. Devoted to reviewing American works, it soon became one of America's most influential literary magazines. By 1850, the movement had generally succeeded. The authors involved in developing an American literature would continue to shape it for "the next 100 years".

== See also ==
- American Indian literary nationalism
- American literary regionalism
- American literature
- American Renaissance (literature)
