= American Renaissance (literature) =

Period in American literature ran from about 1830 to around the Civil War

The American Renaissance period in American literature ran from about 1830 to around the Civil War. A central term in American studies, the American Renaissance was for a while considered synonymous with American Romanticism and was closely associated with Transcendentalism.

== Overview ==
Scholar F. O. Matthiessen originated the phrase "American Renaissance" in his 1941 book American Renaissance: Art and Expression in the Age of Emerson and Whitman. The thematic center of the American Renaissance was what Matthiessen called the "devotion" of all five of his writers to "the possibilities of democracy". He presented the American Renaissance texts as "literature for our democracy” and challenged the nation to repossess them.

Often considered a movement centered in New England, the American Renaissance was inspired in part by a new focus on humanism as a way to move from Calvinism. Literary nationalists at this time were calling for a movement that would develop a unique American literary style to distinguish American literature from British literature. Walter Channing in a November 1815 issue of the North American Review called for American authors to form "a literature of our own," which was amplified by John Neal and other literary critics. Following this call, there was a wave of literary nationalism in America for much of the 1820s that saw writers such as Washington Irving, William Cullen Bryant, and James Fenimore Cooper rise to importance in American literature. This move toward expressing nationalism through literature is considered central to the emergence of the American Renaissance.

== Criticisms ==
There are many criticisms associated with the American Renaissance, and some critics question if it ever actually took place. One of the most prominent criticisms is that authors during this period are seen as simply taking styles and ideas from past movements and culture and reforming them into new, contemporary works.

Some critics say that authors fail to address major political issues during this period, such as slavery, even as they had large influence on the writing of the time. There is also criticism that women authors and women's issues were generally left out of discussion and publication.

The notion of an American Renaissance has been criticized for overemphasizing a small number of European American male writers and artifacts of high culture. William E. Cain noted the "extreme white male formation" of Matthiessen's list of authors and stated that by "devoting hundreds of pages of analysis and celebration to five white male authors, Matthiessen unwittingly prefigured in his book what later readers would dispute and labor to correct."

Some critics argue that literature written by women during this period was not as popular as first thought, and that it took a distant second place in popularity to works written by men. Matthiessen and other scholars are even known to exclude women and minority authors, especially African Americans. Critics also argue that there is no separate style or genre, such as sentimental-domestic fiction, distinguished by gender. However, other critics point out that the most read authors of the time were women, such as Harriet Beecher Stowe and Fanny Fern, and criticize Matthiessen for not including women in the original canon.

The demographic exclusivity of the American Renaissance began eroding among scholars toward the end of the twentieth century. They have included Emily Dickinson in the canon; she started writing poetry in the late 1850s. Harriet Beecher Stowe’s Uncle Tom’s Cabin (1852) rose to a prominent reputation in the late 1970s. African-American literature, including slave narratives by such masters as Frederick Douglass, and early novels by William Wells Brown, has gained increasing recognition.

== Notable authors ==
Most often associated with the American Renaissance movement are Ralph Waldo Emerson's Representative Men and Self-Reliance, Nathaniel Hawthorne's The Scarlet Letter and The House of Seven Gables, Herman Melville's Moby-Dick, Henry David Thoreau's Walden, and Walt Whitman's Leaves of Grass. Most of the main writers associated with the American Renaissance were actually rather unknown during this time and had small followings.

Other authors were later added to this list and found to have contributed to this movement. These include: Edgar Allan Poe, Harriet Beecher Stowe, Emily Dickinson, Frederick Douglass, William Wells Brown, Henry Wadsworth Longfellow, and John Greenleaf Whittier among others.
