= The Portico =

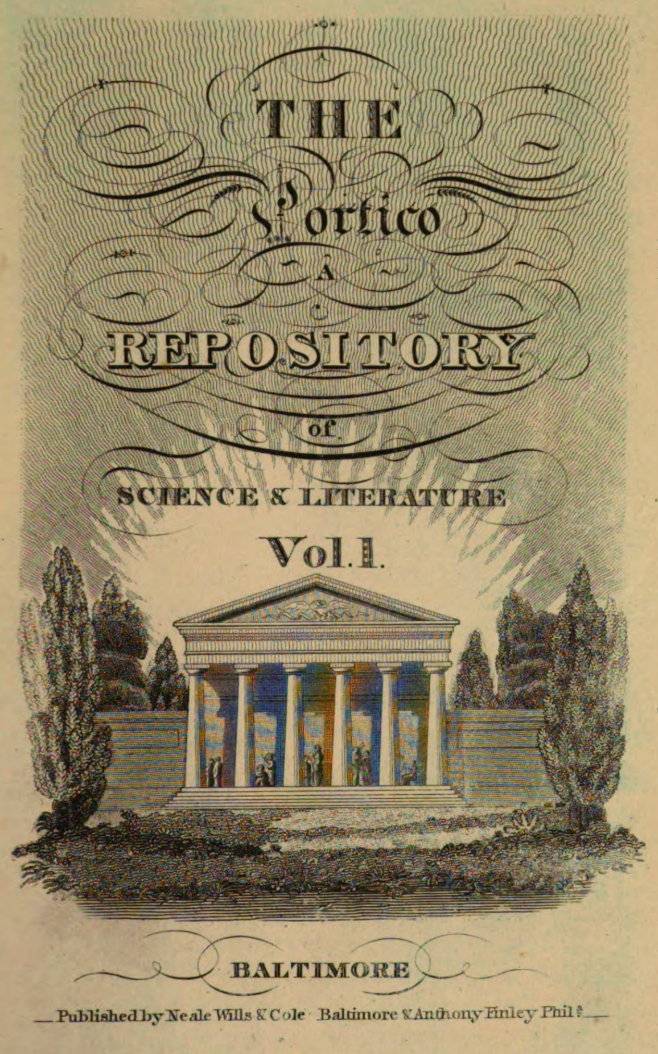
- Title page of volume 1 (Jan-June 1816)
- Co-editor: Stephen Simpson
- Co-editor: Tobias Watkins
- Editor of last issue: John Neal
- Categories: Science, literature
- Frequency: Monthly, quarterly
- Founder: Stephen Simpson and Tobias Watkins
- Founded: 1816
- First issue: January 1816; 210 years ago
- Final issue Number: April–June 1818; 208 years ago Vol 6 No 1
- Company: Neale Wills & Cole
- Country: United States
- Based in: Baltimore
- Language: English

The Portico: A Repository of Science & Literature (1816–1818) was a short-lived Baltimore-based literary journal founded and edited by Stephen Simpson and Tobias Watkins. The monthly journal was formed to publish the members of a small Baltimore literary society, called the Delphian Club. The Portico's contributors include John Pierpont, a poet, and John Neal, a poet, novelist, and journalist who went on to write for English periodicals such as Blackwood's Magazine and to serve as editor of several American papers.

The Portico regularly offered reviews of contemporary British and American works, humorous and serious essays on wide-ranging subjects, and original poetry and fiction. The journal's promotion of American literature through generous reviews of contemporary American works and authors made it one of the most important contributors to early American literary nationalism.
