= Étienne Dumont =

Swiss-French political writer (1759-1829)

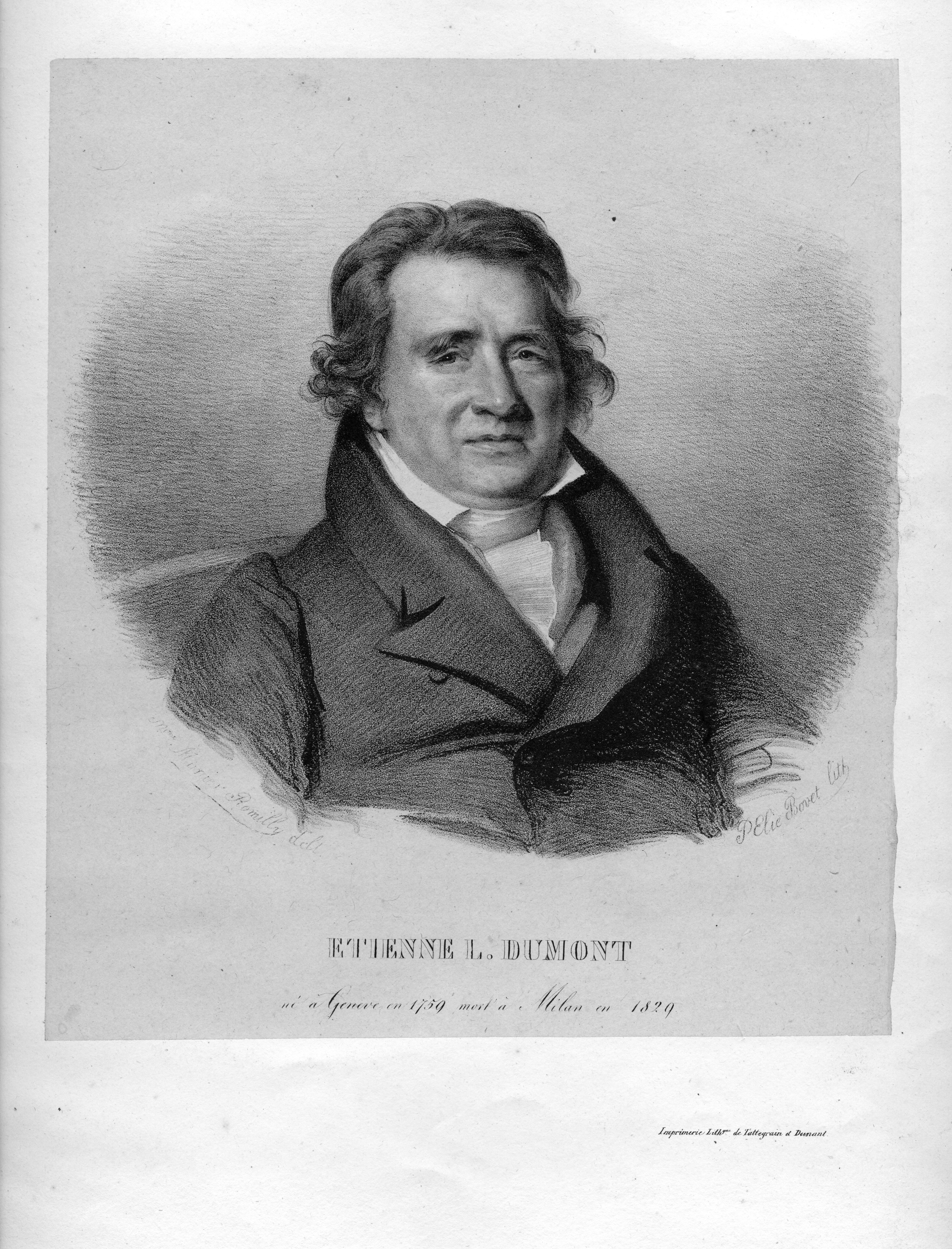
- Étienne Dumont
- Born: Pierre Étienne Louis Dumont; 18 January 1759 or 18 July 1759
- Died: 29 September 1829

Philosophical work
- School: Liberalism

Signature
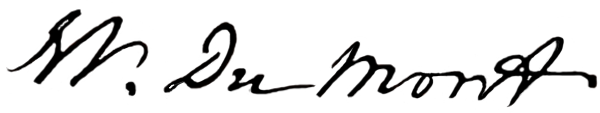

Pierre Étienne Louis Dumont (18 January or 18 July 1759 – 29 September 1829), sometimes anglicised as Stephen Dumont, was a Swiss French political writer. He is chiefly remembered as the French editor of the writings of the English philosopher and social reformer Jeremy Bentham.

== Early life ==
Dumont was born in Geneva, the youngest in the family of six children of the jewellet Abraham David Dumont (died 1762) and his wife Louise-Esther Illens. His family had been citizens of good repute from the days of Calvin. He was educated for the ministry at the Collège de Genève, and in 1781 was chosen one of the pastors of the city. Then politics suddenly turned the course of his life. He belonged to the liberals or democrats, and the triumph of the aristocratic party, through the interference of the courts of France and Sardinia, made continued residence in Geneva impossible, though he was not among the number of the proscribed. He went to join his mother and sisters in St Petersburg. In this he was probably influenced in part by the example of his townsman Pierre Lefort, the first tutor, minister, and general of the Tsar. At St Petersburg he was for eighteen months pastor of the French church.

== Move to England ==
In 1785 he moved to London, the former prime minister Lord Shelburne, who had been created Marquess of Lansdowne the previous year, having invited him to undertake the education of his sons. In 1786, Dumont succeeded Joseph Priestley as Lansdowne's librarian. It was at Lansdowne's house, where he was treated virtually as member of the family, that he became acquainted with many illustrious men, including Charles James Fox, Richard Brinsley Sheridan, Lord Holland and Sir Samuel Romilly. With the last of these he formed a close and enduring friendship, which had an important influence on his life and pursuits.

== Periods in Paris ==
In 1788 Dumont visited Paris with Romilly. During a stay of two months in that city he had almost daily intercourse with Honoré Mirabeau, and a certain affinity of talents and pursuits led to an intimacy between two persons diametrically opposed to each other in habits and in character.

=== Mirabeau atelier ===
In the summer of 1789 Dumont went once more to Paris. The object of the journey was to obtain through Jacques Necker, who had just returned to office, an unrestricted restoration of Genevese liberty, by cancelling the treaty of guarantee between France and Switzerland, which prevented the republic from enacting new laws without the consent of the parties to this treaty. The proceedings and negotiations to which this mission gave rise necessarily brought Dumont into connection with most of the leading men in the Constituent Assembly, and made him an interested spectator, sometimes even a participator, indirectly, in the events of the French Revolution.

The same cause also led him to renew his acquaintance with Mirabeau, whom he found occupied with his duties as a deputy, and with the composition of his journal, the Courrier de Provence. For a time Dumont took an active and very efficient part in the conduct of this journal, supplying it with reports as well as original articles, and also furnishing Mirabeau with speeches to be delivered or rather read in the assembly, as related in his highly instructive and interesting posthumous work entitled Souvenirs sur Mirabeau (1832). In fact his friend George Wilson used to relate that one day, when they were dining together at a table d'hôte at Versailles, he saw Dumont engaged in writing the most celebrated paragraph of Mirabeau's address to the king for the removal of the troops. He also reported such of Mirabeau's speeches as he did not write, embellishing them from his own stores, which were inexhaustible.

=== Break with Mirabeau ===
This co-operation soon came to an end; for, being attacked in pamphlets as one of Mirabeau's writers, he felt hurt at the notoriety thus given to his name in connection with a man occupying Mirabeau's peculiar position, and returned to England in 1791.

=== Second period in Paris ===
In 1791, Dumont along with the Marquis de Condorcet, Thomas Paine, and Jacques-Pierre Brissot published a brief newspaper promoting republicanism. Letters in French written to Romilly by Dumont on the early stages of the French Revolution were translated by Romilly and James Scarlett, as originating from a fictitious German, "Henry Frederic Groenvelt", and published under the title Letters containing an Account of the late Revolution in France. Subsequently Romilly made attempts to suppress the book of these "Groenvelt Letters".

=== Final return to England ===
Dumont returned from Paris to England in summer 1791, in the company of Tom Paine and Lord Daer. He had no time for Paine's politics: Achille François du Chastellet had approached him some months earlier with an placard by Paine against the French monarchy, and he had refused to have anything to do with it. When it was posted around Paris, the National Constituent Assembly denounced it.

== Later life ==
In 1802, with the Peace of Amiens, Dumont travelled over various parts of Europe with Lord Henry Petty. On his return to the United Kingdom he settled down to the editorship of Bentham's works. In 1814 the restoration of Geneva to independence induced him to return there, and he soon became leader of the supreme council. He devoted particular attention to the City's judicial and penal systems, and many improvements on both are due to him.

Johann Wolfgang von Goethe was an admirer of his, declaring that "Dumont...is a moderate liberal, just as all rational people are and ought to be, and as I myself am."

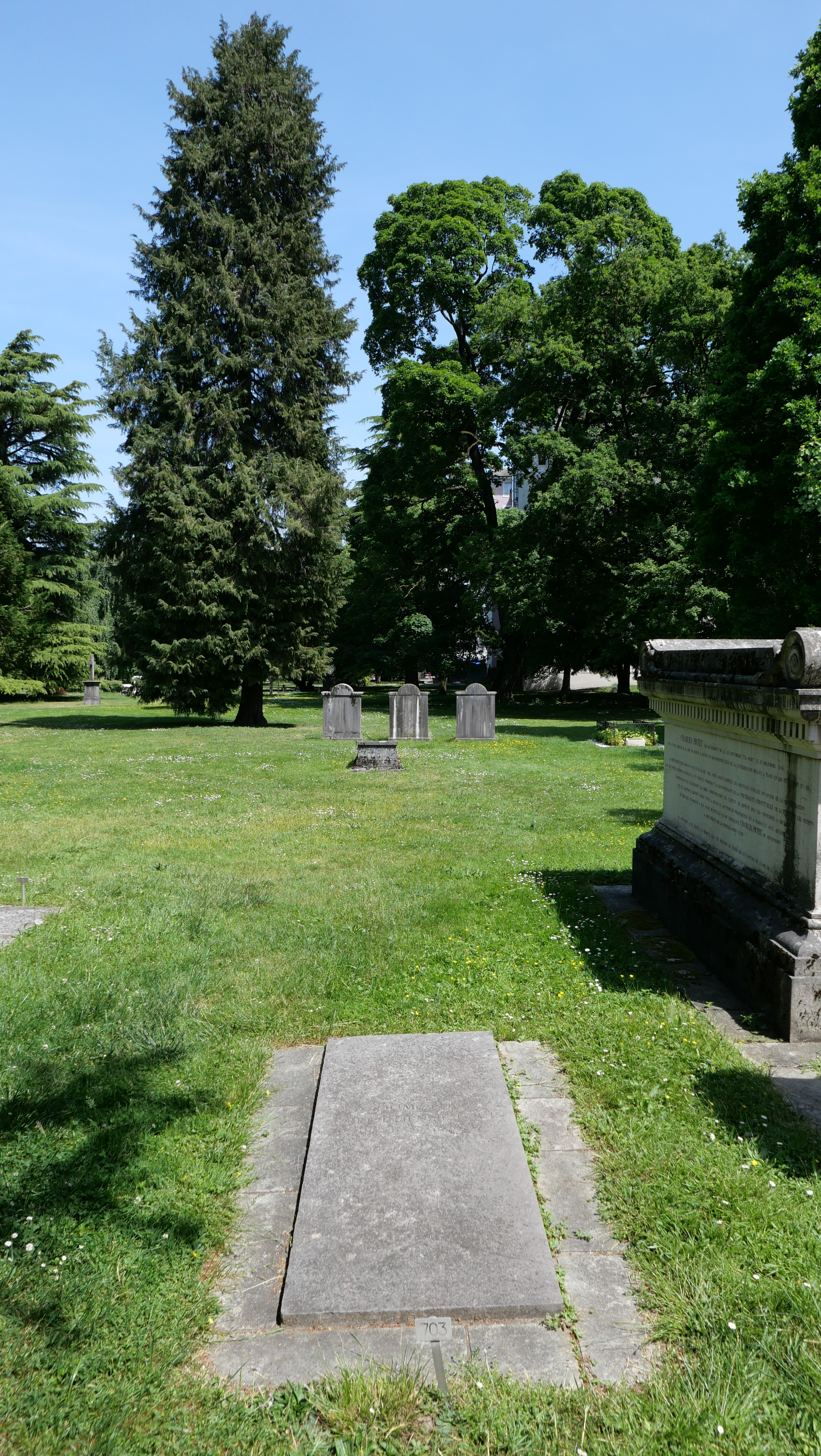
Dumont's grave at the Cimetière des Rois in Geneva

Dumont died at Milan while on an autumn tour on 29 September 1829.

== Editing Bentham ==
An admirer of Jeremy Bentham, Dumont made a major effort not merely to translate Bentham into French, but to recast and edit his writings in a form suitable for the ordinary reading public. Dumont's editing was heavy-handed, but necessarily so.

According to his own account, all the fundamental ideas and most of the illustrative material were already in Bentham's manuscripts; but his task was chiefly to abridge by striking out repeated matter, to supply lacunae, to secure uniformity of style, and to improve the French.

Bentham's writing (whether in English or in French) was notoriously convoluted and impenetrable, and according to one reviewer, writing in 1817, "[i]t is indeed when he speaks by another’s lips, that he appears to most advantage; and it to the graces of style which Mr Dumont has given him that he owes the reputation which he has acquired, and which is, from that cause, much greater in foreign countries than in his own. ... [I]t is possible that, but for Dumont, Bentham’s reputation might never have emerged from obscurity." In places, Dumont was also prepared to oversimplify Bentham's ideas, and indeed to contradict them, for example where he considered that Bentham had been over-critical of the British constitution, or had expressed religious scepticism.

The following works of Bentham were published under Dumont's editorship:

- Traité de legislation civile et pénale (1802)
- Théorie des peines et des recompenses (1811)
- Tactique des assemblées legislatives (1815)
- Traité des preuves judiciaires (1823)
- De l'organization judiciaire et de la codification (1828)

== Bibliography ==
- Blamires, Cyprian (1993). "Bentham et Dumont". In Mulligan, Kevin; Roth, Robert (eds.). Regards sur Bentham et l'utilitarianisme: actes du colloque organisée à Genève les 23 et 24 novembre 1990 sous les auspices des Facultés de droit et des lettres. Geneva: Droz. pp. 11–25.
- Blamires, Cyprian (2008). The French Revolution and the Creation of Benthamism. Basingstoke: Palgrave Macmillan.
- Blamires, Cyprian (2009). "Dumont, Pierre-Étienne-Louis [Étienne] (1759–1829)". Oxford Dictionary of National Biography (online ed.). Oxford University Press. doi:10.1093/ref:odnb/98255. (subscription required)
- Selth, Jefferson P. (1997). Firm Heart and Capacious Mind: the life and friends of Etienne Dumont. Lanham (MD): University Press of America.
- Whatmore, Richard (2007). "Etienne Dumont, the British Constitution, and the French Revolution". Historical Journal. 50: 23–47. doi:10.1017/s0018246x06005905. S2CID 144898580.
- Whatmore, Richard (2012). Against War and Empire: Geneva, Britain, and France in the eighteenth century. New Haven: Yale University Press. ISBN 9780300175578.

Attribution
