= Stephen Simpson (writer) =

American journalist (1789–1854)

- Born: July 24, 1789; Philadelphia, Pennsylvania, U.S.
- Died: August 17, 1854 (aged 65)
- Occupations: Banker, journalist, writer, politician
- Political party: Jeffersonian Republican, Jacksonian Democrat, Working Men's Party, Federalist, Whig
- Spouse: Mary C. Watkins

Stephen Simpson (July 24, 1789 – August 17, 1854) was born in Philadelphia, the son of George Simpson, a prominent Philadelphia banker. During the War of 1812 he fought in the Battle of New Orleans under General Andrew Jackson. Through his father's connections Stephen became a cashier at the First Bank of the United States where he soon resigned and went to work at Stephen Girard's bank. Soon after he worked as a writer for a local newspaper where he wrote a series of editorials publicly attacking the First Bank of the United States. He later co-founded the Columbian Observer where he continued his public attacks on this bank.

Simpson later preferred writing over political pursuits and is also noted for his other works which include a dual biography of George Washington and Thomas Jefferson and another biography critical of prominent Philadelphia banker Girard. Simpson's social and political philosophy embraced both conservative and radical ideals.

== Early life ==
Stephen Simpson was born in Philadelphia, Pennsylvania, on July 24, 1789. He was married to Mary Chaloner Watkins but there is no record about the date of marriage, any children or other related information available. His father, George Simpson (1759–1832) had been an assistant commissary-general in the American Revolution and had a career in banking. Stephen's father held successively important positions in the Bank of North America chartered by the Confederation Congress, the Bank of the United States and in the Girard Bank of Philadelphia. Stephen gained a keen understanding of how the banks operated and of their many abuses from his father. Stephen's younger brother Henry, was a member of the Pennsylvania State legislature, and later wrote a book, The lives of eminent Philadelphians, now deceased, 1859, which includes short biographies of his older brother Stephen and his father George.

As a young man Simpson was given a position through his father as a note clerk in the First Bank of the United States, from which he later voluntarily resigned in contempt when he learned of the questionable ways in which they conducted their affairs. Like his father, he then went to work for Stephen's bank, which financed and made possible America's involvement in the War of 1812.

== Military service ==
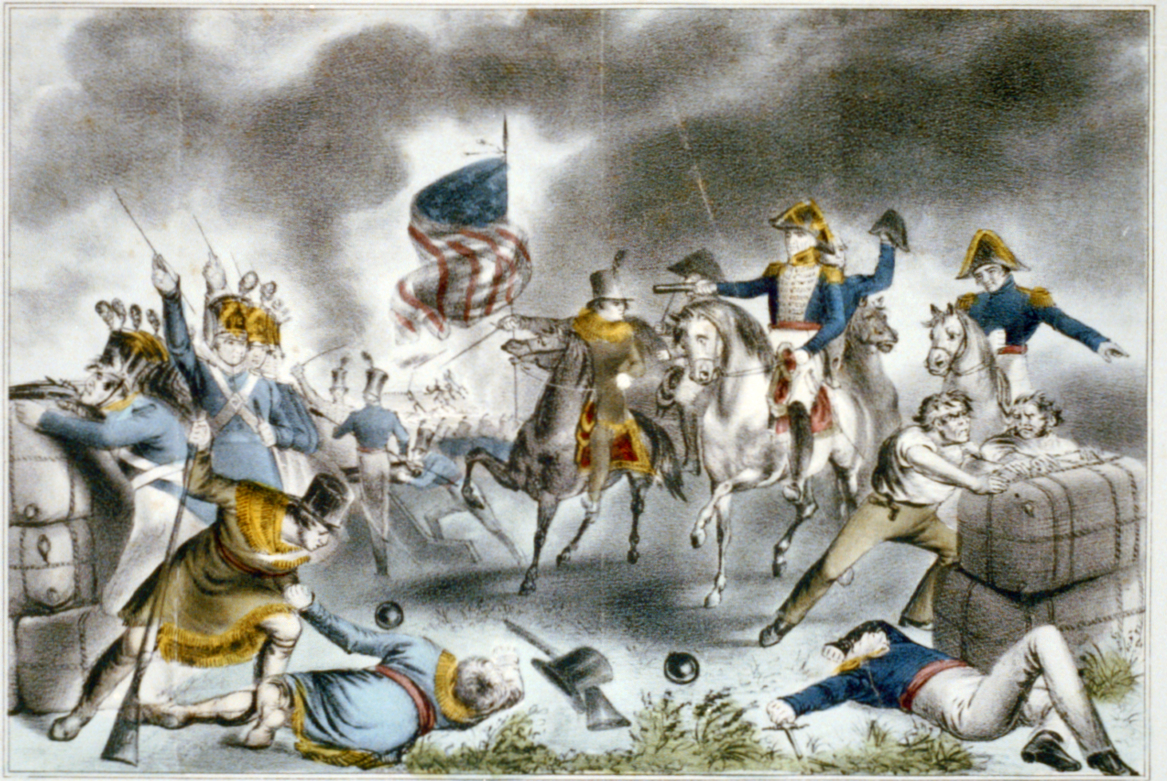
Currier & Ives painting of General Jackson at the Battle of New Orleans where Stephen Simpson fought

On January 8, 1815, Simpson and older brother George Jr., who was an officer, both fought in the Battle of New Orleans during the War of 1812. Simpson had volunteered for battle and served with distinction, serving under General Andrew Jackson in the only company in which any men were killed.

While away from home, his wife resided with his father in Philadelphia where he corresponded and wrote some fifteen letters to her, sent from the various cities where he was stationed. Many of his letters were lengthy and contained detailed information of the places he passed through, making numerous references to military life and its operations. He described New Orleans, its houses, the "Carnival Feast" and the impending British attack. In his letter of January 30, 1815, Simpson describes the festivities which occurred after the evacuation of New Orleans by the British troops, and expresses praise for Andrew Jackson.

== Professional and political career ==
On returning to civilian life, Simpson along with his brother-in-law Tobias Watkins, (Note: Watkins also served in the War of 1812 as a physician, later became the assistant Surgeon-General (1818–1821), and later the fourth auditor of the U.S. Treasury (1824–1829).) founded The Portico; a Repository of Science and Literature, (1816–1818), a monthly periodical based in Baltimore, where he functioned as the chief editor and proprietor. The monthly journal was formed to publish the members of a small Baltimore literary society the Delphian Club.

Soon after Simpson began a series of critical columns criticizing the First Bank of the United States which appeared in The Aurora, the voice of the Democratic party in Philadelphia, then published by Colonel William Duane. President Thomas Jefferson credited the Aurora for its ardent support and his subsequent victory in the election of 1800. (Note: Jefferson appointed Duane to Lieutenant Colonel in July 1805 for his efforts. Duane's role as editor of the Aurora and attacks on the Federalists resulted in his arrest for violation of the Alien and Sedition Acts.) In an editorial dated November 8, 1810, twenty reasons were submitted as to why the National Bank's charter should not be renewed. Emphasis was placed on the fact that two-thirds of the bank's stock was owned by foreigners and that the bank answered largely to British interests.

To avoid arrest Simpson's controversial articles were anonymously signed "Brutus", and subsequently attracted much attention and curiosity. The columns were bold, candid and openly hostile attacks upon the management of the Bank, exposing its policy and various practices in intimate detail. To conceal his identity Simpson's letters were secretly dropped at a designated place, where a boy was sent to receive and deliver them to the office of The Aurora where they would soon appear in print. No one at the Columbian Observer was aware of any connection with Simpson and the newspaper, save perhaps its editor. Public curiosity grew resulting in speculations everywhere. In his book The lives of George Washington and Thomas Jefferson, 1833, Simpson continued his criticism of the bank, claiming, among other things, that it was "the chief cause of Jefferson's growing dislike of Washington", who supported it, and the "sole" reason why Jefferson hated Alexander Hamilton.

Simpson then worked as a journalist on a local newspaper where he wrote a series of editorials publicly attacking the management of the U.S. bank along with its policy and transactions. In 1822, Simpson and associate John Conrad founded the Columbian Observer (1822–1825), a newspaper whose publication and management was given to Jesper Harding. Through the Observer Simpson continued his letters of " Brutus" criticizing the U.S. Bank. His style of writing along with his frank and openly hostile manner were once again evident, no different than in his former articles. Simpson made no further attempt to conceal the fact that 'Stephen Simpson' was indeed the author of the original articles published by The Aurora. Once again public curiosity grew. Through the Observer Simpson also voiced his support for the policies of Andrew Jackson. Even before Jackson was nominated a presidential candidate by the Tennessee legislature, Simpson, along with Stephen Duane, editor of the Aurora, had already begun lending their support for Jackson as a presidential candidate. Some historians have assumed Simpson's support of General Jackson was based on their mutual distrust of banks, as well as his admiration for a man and a general which he served under during the War of 1812. Simpson considered Jackson to be the greatest man in America.

Simpson, similar to Robert Dale Owen in New York, was a party leader and political candidate of The Philadelphia Party, also known as the Working Men's Party (1828–1831). Simpson and Owen embraced some of the radical social principles of Thomas Jefferson regarding banks, believing that labor created all wealth and that inequality was caused by excessive ownership of private property and other monopolies. By 1800 most people who worked at common trades, on farms or did other common labor preferred the party of Jefferson and James Madison over the party of Washington and Alexander Hamilton. In the Jacksonian period, Working Men's parties arose including associations of farmers, factory workers and city mechanics. Trade unions consisted of skilled artisans organized in their respective craft societies, such as Philadelphia's cordwainers, hatters and carpenters. These various organizations were America's first labor movement. They were often led by men who had not themselves been workers; Simpson was one of these. The "Workies" sought universal male suffrage, free public education, and protection from debtor imprisonment. They opposed compulsory service in the militia and competition from prison contract labor.

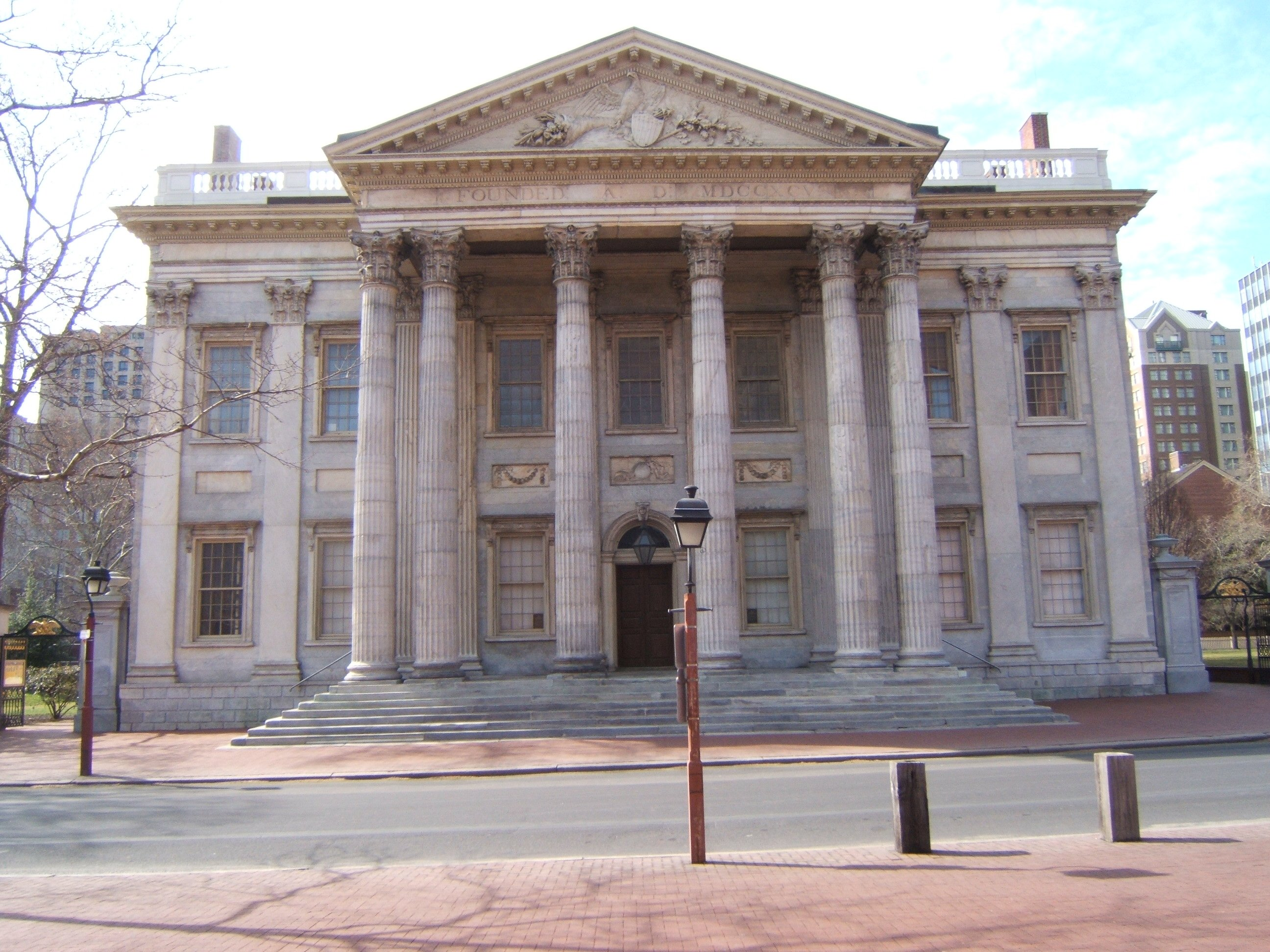
First Bank of the United States (1797–1811); Building later used by Girard Bank where Simpson was employed as a note clerk also

Like others who had been successful Working Men's Party candidates, Simpson in his 1830 race for Congress also ran on another ticket. In his case, having broken with Jackson for not giving him a post in the administration, he ran as a Federalist. After losing, Simpson founded a new paper in 1831, the Pennsylvania Whig, devoted to the Whig party, attacking the abuses of the Jackson administration and supporting the Second Bank of the United States.

When the First Bank of the United States charter expired in 1811, Stephen Girard, after selling various foreign assets, bought up the controlling interests of the bank and opened his own bank in the same building in Philadelphia. It was through this bank that the War of 1812 was largely funded. Simpson's father George was the head cashier in Girard's bank and while there he arranged employment for his son Stephen. In 1831 when Stephen's father died, he did not receive his father's position as expected. Subsequently, Girard was maligned by a disappointed Simpson in his book, Biography of Stephen Girard, a work attacking Girard and his various involvements with his bank, released within three months after Girard's death. Many questionable claims made about Girard can be traced to this book, considered by some to be written by an ungrateful employee who distorted and overstated issues involving Girard .

== Social and political philosophy ==
Simpson embraced a combination of both conservative and radical ideas in his social and political philosophy. He generally disliked banks because of the paper money they issued, regarding it as among the fundamental reasons for the workers' degradation, maintaining that banking enabled the rich to "extort labor upon their own terms of bare subsistence", that banks "levied a tax directly upon every commodity produced by labour; which tax became immediately absorbed into the pocket of the capitalists".

Simpson believed that all working men had a natural right to education in a democratic society, "where every man is an elector". He felt that public education was not in force, primarily because the rich were opposed to the idea of an educated subordinate class, that the wealthy preferred the working class be kept ignorant, and hence easier to control. He maintained that an educated working class could better represent themselves as a class, especially at the ballot box. In 18th and 19th century America these ideals were also embraced by Jefferson and other notables.

Simpson held a contempt for Malthusianism, widely respected in its day for its conservative social dicta and regarded it as a superfluous attempt to justify social exploitation and inequality. He viewed it as "a singular infatuation prevailing among all modern writers on economy, that the scarcity of food among the laboring people is attributable to excess of population". He maintained this notion to be a fallacy, easily refuted by simply observing the hoarding of resources by the very rich, a fact he believed was "staring them in the face". Simpson maintained that nature was able to provide food and the means of comfort for all of society, and that this advent was hindered and dominated by a selfish few who misused and misappropriated nature's abundance, believing that the vices of man, and not the order of nature, were the cause of hunger, pauperism and social inequality. He believed that labor was the source of all wealth and that social inequality was the end result of private property, generally considered a radical idea in a land greatly given to farming and other free enterprise. Labor radicals like Simpson and contemporaries like Seth Luther took exception to "'the enrichment of the wealthy on the backs of the poor", especially in areas where coerced child labor was involved.

Simpson's views are tempered with the consideration that he is not urging the confiscation of wealth by one class from another but advocates a more equitable sharing of the two classes. He saw the distribution of wealth to be more rational and beneficial to all if it were to be determined on a "more equitable ratio" which resulted in human happiness associated with an educated "general competence and as nearly as possible, an equality of the enjoyments of life...happiness must regulate the just value of labor."

Simpson advanced these and other theories of political economy in his book The Working Man's Manual, 1831, where he emphasizes the principles of production and labor as being the primary source of wealth and makes inquiries into the principles of public credit, currency, the wages of labor, and the functions of social government in general. In the introduction Simpson dismisses the contemporary conservative writers whom he refers to as "bewildered in the fogs of Gothic institutions", maintaining that social labor policies should be based on "the elucidation of obvious principles, of practical utility or equitable application". Simpson presents the work as a moral essay, not a treatise, on the subject of political economy.

== Works ==
Simpson wrote a number of biographies and other works including a dual biography of George Washington and Thomas Jefferson.

- The Author's Jewel: Consisting of Essays, Miscellaneous, Literary and Moral (1823), e'Book
- The Working Man's Manual, a new theory of political economy on the principle of production the source of wealth (1831); e'Book
- Biography of Stephen Girard, with His Will Affixed (1832); e'Book
- The lives of George Washington and Thomas Jefferson (1833); e'Book
- The readiest reckoner ever invented, for assisting Tradesmen, Merchants, Gentlemen, &c (1855); eBook

== Final days ==
Simpson continued in his writings the remainder of his life. He died in Philadelphia on August 17, 1854, at the age of 65. He is buried in the family vault, at Saint Paul's Church, on South Third Street in Philadelphia.

== Bibliography ==
- Adams, Sean Patrick (2013). A Companion to the Era of Andrew Jackson. John Wiley & Sons, 616 pages. ISBN 978-1-1182-9082-8.
- DiFilippo, Thomas J. "Stephen Girard, The Man, His College and Estate". Archived from the original on March 23, 2006.
- Heidler, David Stephen; Heidler, Jeanne T. (2004). Encyclopedia of the War of 1812. Naval Institute Press, 636 pages., Book
- Holdsworth, John Thom; Dewey, Davis Rich (1911). The First and Second Banks of the United States, Volume 4. U.S. Government Printing Office, 311 pages.; eBook
- Jenkins, Howard Malcolm; Seilhamer, George Oberkirsh (1898). Memorial History of the City of Philadelphia, from Its First Settlement to Year 1895. New York History Company., eBook
- Malone, Dumas (1981). The Sage of Monticello. Jefferson and His Time. Vol. 6. Little Brown. ISBN 978-0-316-54478-8.
- Matson, Cathy D. (2006). The Economy of Early America: Historical Perspectives & New Directions. Penn State Press, 380 pages., Book
- Parsons, Brockport Lynn Hudson (2009). 'The Birth of Modern Politics : Andrew Jackson, John Quincy Adams, and the Election of 1828. Oxford University Press, 272 pages. ISBN 978-0-1997-1850-4. Book
- Pessen, Edward. "Builders of the Young Republic". United States department of Labor. Archived from the original on November 25, 2013.
- —— (2005). The Ideology of Stephen Simpson, Upperclass Champion of the Early Philadelphia Working Men's Movement., PDF book online
- Sellers, Charles (1992). The Market Revolution: Jacksonian America, 1815-1846. Oxford University Press, 512 pages., Book
- Simpson, Henry (1859). The lives of eminent Philadelphians, now deceased. William Brotherhead, publisher., eBook eText
- Simpson, Stephen (1833). The lives of George Washington and Thomas Jefferson. Henry Young, Philadelphia.
- "Stephen Simpson Letters to His Wife 1813-1829". Princeton University.
- Eminent Scholars, Historians and Statesmen (1907). The National Cyclopaedia of American Biography: Being the History of the United States . . . Vol. V. James T. White & Company., eBook
- Wilson, James Grant; Fiske, John (1888). Appleton's Cyclopedia of American Biography, Vol. ii. D. Appleton and Company, New York., eBook, Other formats
- —— (1889). Appleton's Cyclopedia of American Biography, Vol. vi. D. Appleton and Company, New York., eBook

=== Further reading ===
- Ingraam, Henry Atlee (1896).The life and character of Stephen Girard ...: mariner and merchant, e'Book
- Platt, John D.R. (1968). Full text of "The United States Independent Treasury System, Washington Division of History, U.S. Office of Archeology and Historic Preservation; e'Book
