= Samuel Kettell =

American author

Samuel Kettell (1800–1855) was an American writer. He also wrote under the name "Sampson Short-and-fat".

He compiled Specimens of American Poetry, with Critical and Biographical Notices, the first comprehensive anthology of American poetry, which was published by Samuel Griswold Goodrich in 1829. The three volume collection included 188 poets, a historical introduction, and chronological listing of American poetry. The volumes came to be dubbed "Goodrich's Kettle of Poetry."

From September 1847 to March 1848 Kettell edited Merry's Museum.
