= Tobias Watkins =

American physician, writer and educator (1780–1855)

Dr. Tobias Watkins

Fourth Auditor of the United States Treasury
- In office 1824–1829
- President: James Monroe; John Quincy Adams
- Succeeded by: Amos Kendall

Secretary of the US Spanish Diplomatic Commission
- In office 1821–1824
- President: James Monroe

Personal details
- Born: December 12, 1780 Anne Arundel County, Maryland, United States
- Died: November 14, 1855 (aged 74) Washington, DC, United States
- Education: College of Philadelphia Department of Medicine
- Occupation: Physician, editor, writer, educator, political appointee

Military service
- Allegiance: United States
- Branch/service: United States Army; United States Navy
- Years of service: 1814–1821 (Army); 1799–1801 (Navy)
- Rank: Assistant surgeon general (Army); Assistant surgeon (Navy)
- Unit: 38th Army Infantry Regiment
- Battles/wars: War of 1812

Tobias Watkins (December 12, 1780 – November 14, 1855) was an American medical doctor, editor, writer, educator, and political appointee in the Baltimore-Washington, DC, area. He played leading roles in early American literary institutions such as The Portico and the Delphian Club and in early American medical institutions such as The Baltimore Medical and Physical Recorder and The Maryland State Medical Society. He served as an assistant surgeon general in the United States Army, secretary to the Spanish Commission following the Adams–Onís Treaty, Fourth Auditor of the United States Treasury, and an education leader in the Washington, DC, area. The US Supreme Court decisions connected to his high-profile conviction for embezzlement are part of the history of original habeas as it relates to federal review of federal custody in the US.

== Education and medical career ==
Tobias Watkins was born on December 12, 1780, in Anne Arundel County, Maryland.

He graduated from St. John's College in Annapolis, Maryland, in 1798 and received a Doctorate of Medicine from the College of Philadelphia Department of Medicine in 1802. Between 1799 and 1801, Watkins served as an assistant surgeon in the United States Navy. He opened his first private medical practice in Havre de Grace, Maryland, in 1803, but moved it shortly thereafter to Baltimore.

During the War of 1812 in 1813 Watkins served as a surgeon with the 38th Army Infantry Regiment. The following year he was appointed major surgeon at a Marine Hospital, where he served until June 1815. In 1818 Watkins was appointed an assistant surgeon general in the United States Army under Surgeon General Joseph Lovell and assigned to inspect the medical staff and facilities of the Army Division of the North. Between May and October of that year he traveled as far north as Castine, Maine, as far south as Annapolis, Maryland, and as far west as Niagara Falls, New York. The army was reorganized again in 1821 and Watkins returned to private medical practice upon honorable discharge. In 1826 he delivered a discourse before the Columbian Institute for the Promotion of Arts and Sciences to celebrate its tenth anniversary. The institute published his words as a booklet later that year.

== Editorship and writing ==
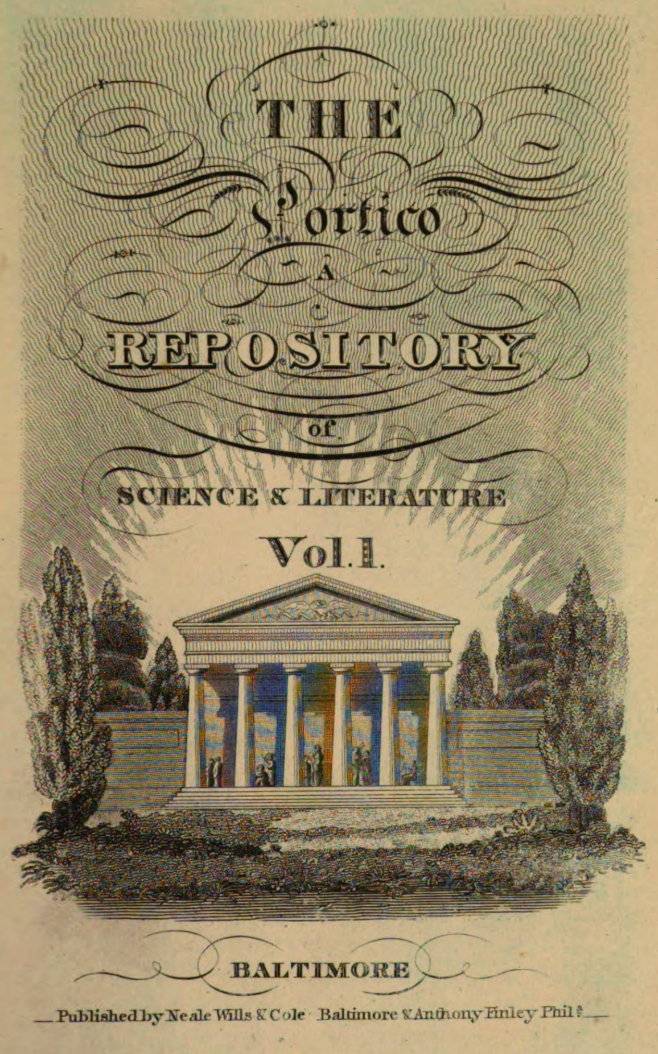
The Portico, co-founded by Watkins in 1816

Watkins founded The Baltimore Medical and Physical Recorder, Maryland's first and the US's fifth medical journal. He edited and published the journal monthly from April 1808 through its final issue in August 1809. The first volume included more than eighty articles on "every conceivable subject", including the recently recognized smallpox vaccine treatment.

In the 1810s Watkins entered the field of literature by publishing essays on Lord Byron in a Philadelphia newspaper edited by his brother in-law, Stephen Simpson. He used the pen name "A.", which many readers misunderstood to refer to historian Paul Allen.

In 1816 he co-founded The Portico: A Repository of Science & Literature, in which he published several medical works he translated from French as well as his own literary essays until its final issue in 1818. The Portico was closely associated with the Delphian Club, which Watkins co-founded with John Neal, John Pierpont, and four other men in Baltimore in 1816. The club disbanded in 1825. Shortly after its establishment, Watkins served as the club's president, known as the "Tripod", and earned the nickname "Pertinax Particular". In 1821 he published Tales of the Tripod; Or A Delphian Evening under this nickname, a collection of three stories, two of which are about fellow Delphian Paul Allen. In 1923, literary historian Fred Lewis Pattee included the collection on his list of leading short stories from the 1820s.

The Delphian Club brought him into association with other eccentric Baltimore professionals of law, literature, art, and medicine at a time when the city was the third largest in the US. Watkins helped John Neal publish his first novel in 1817 and also worked with Neal in 1818 to write most of A History of the American Revolution (published 1819), otherwise attributed to fellow Delphian Paul Allen. John Neal took over for Watkins as editor of the last issue of The Portico when Watkins left Baltimore on his 1818 tour as assistant surgeon general in the army.

== Political appointments and legal battle ==
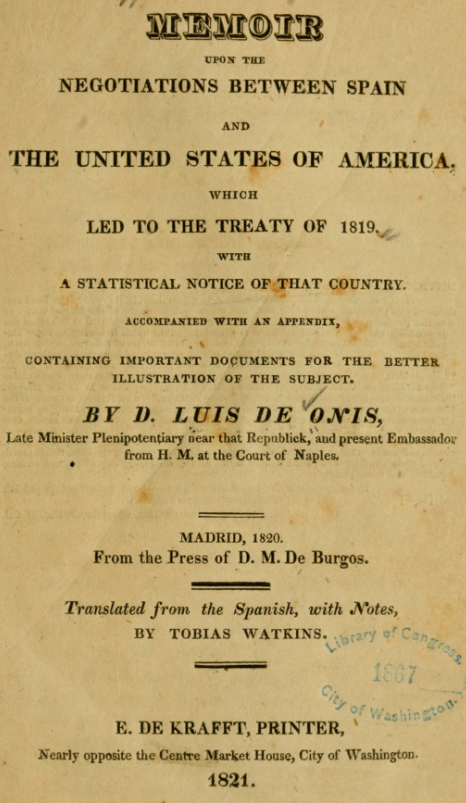
Translation by Watkins of Luis de Onís's report from his time on the Spanish Commission

Tobias Watkins was a close friend of John Quincy Adams, who, as US Secretary of State under President James Monroe, secured Watkins an appointment as secretary to the Spanish Commission. This commission handled American claims against Spain following the signing of the Adams–Onís Treaty in 1819, which resulted in Spain's cession of Florida to the US. Part of his work on the commission involved translating from Spanish Luis de Onís's 152-page memoir on the diplomatic negotiation, which was published in English in 1821.

When the Spanish Commission disbanded in 1824, Adams secured Watkins an appointment as Fourth Auditor of the United States Treasury, which he served through the Adams presidency until 1829. As fourth auditor he embezzled money from the treasury for "politics and electioneering", a common crime in this period. Upon assuming office in 1829, President Andrew Jackson replaced Watkins with Amos Kendall, who discovered Watkins had embezzled $3,050. (Note: $3,050 in 1829 was approximately equal to six years' wages for an artisan or twelve years' wages for an unskilled laborer and is approximately equivalent to $92,215 in 2025.) Jackson assigned Attorney General John M. Berrien to prosecute Watkins, who secured a conviction for perjury and misappropriation of public funds. Watkins was sentenced to nine months in prison and a fine equal to his embezzlement, but he was held in prison for an additional two years for inability to pay the fine. Jackson ordered a sign attached above the door to Watkins's cell labeled "Criminal's Apartment".

Watkins's trial attracted considerable public attention and was an embarrassment to President Adams, who recorded in his journal:

That an officer under my administration, and appointed partly at my recommendation, should have embezzled any part of the public moneys is a deeper affliction to me than almost anything else that has happened; that he was personally and warmly my friend aggravates the calamity.

Watkins felt abandoned by Adams and wrote to John Neal from prison, asking him to

Tell me what to do, ... but for God's sake, tell me not to engage again in politics, unless it be to hunt down both parties to destruction. I have sacrificed every thing [sic] for the one, and have met in return neglect and insult — by the other I am persecuted, harrassed [sic], trampled to the earth — proscribed like a wretch with the Plague, so that not a creature dare venture within the infected atmosphere.

In the legal proceedings, Watkins's family lost "every thing [sic] ...— even the beds they sleep on" were seized for payment of his fine. Feeling persecuted in jail, he wrote of a prison official being replaced by a "creature of the President" to deny him family visits, as well as a request from the administration "to have me removed from the more decent room which I now occupy to one of the cells!"

In 1833 Watkins petitioned the US Supreme Court for a writ of habeas corpus, challenging the district court's criminal jurisdiction in his conviction. As a result he was released February 1833, but was arrested again the same day under three writs of capias ad respondendum issued by Attorney General Roger B. Taney. Watkins petitioned again for a writ of habeas corpus and was released again the following month. Chief Justice John Marshall's opinions in the 1830 and 1833 decisions are part of the history of original habeas as it relates to federal review of federal custody in the US.

== Freemasonry ==
Watkins joined Washington Lodge Number 3 of the Freemasons in 1805 and served as Deputy Grand Master of the Grand Lodge of Maryland 1809–1813 and Grand Master of the Grand Lodge of Maryland 1813–1814 and 1816–1818. He was the first High Priest of the Encampment of the Knights Templar in 1812. His friend John Neal recalled that Watkins was "so pre-eminently popular [with the Masons] that nothing he could say or do, was ever able to shake their faith in him, or their love".

== Character and later life ==
John Neal described Watkins as "both generous and extravagant" in that he "would sooner empty his pockets into the lap of a stranger, than pay his butcher or grocer". Neal blamed this character trait for what he saw as Watkins "always laboring under embarrassment, up to the day of his death", citing that at the time of his appointment to the US Spanish Diplomatic Commission Watkins was on the brink of economic ruin by his own mismanagement of his family's funds.

In the 1840s, Watkins served as head of the boys' common school in the Fourth Presbyterian Church in Alexandria, Virginia. In 1849 he co-founded and served as the first Vice President of the Columbian Association of Teachers, an organization with over 100 members.

Watkins died on November 14, 1855, in Washington, DC.
