= Mary Brooks (disambiguation) =

Mary Brooks (1907–2002) was an American politician. Mary Brooks may also refer to:

- Mary Brooks Picken (1886–1981), American author
- Mary E. Brooks (1803–1895), American poet
