= French leave =

Departure without asking for permission

French leave (sometimes a French exit, an Irish goodbye or an Irish exit, or in French a filer à l'anglaise) is a departure from a location or event without informing others or without seeking approval. Examples include relatively innocuous acts such as leaving a party without bidding farewell in order to avoid disturbing or upsetting the host, or more problematic acts such as a soldier leaving his post without authorization.

The first attestation of the phrase in the Oxford English Dictionary is from 1751, a time when the English and French cultures were heavily interlinked.

== Usage ==
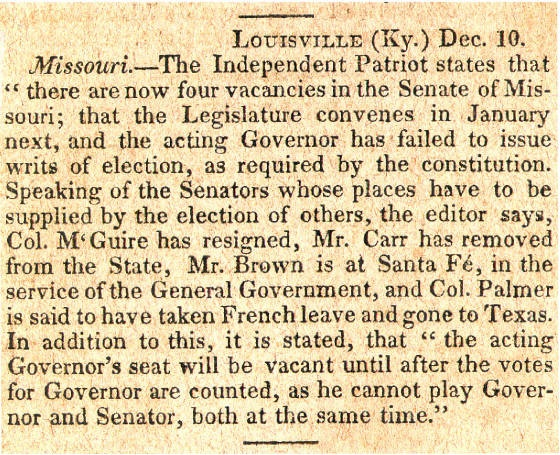
Article from the December 29, 1825, edition of the National Gazette and Literary Register published in Philadelphia reporting that Missouri State Senator "Col. Palmer is said to have taken French leave and gone to Texas".

The Oxford English Dictionary records: "the custom (in the 18th century prevalent in France and sometimes imitated in England) of going away from a reception, etc. without taking leave of the host or hostess. Hence, jocularly, to take French leave is to go away, or do anything, without permission or notice."

James Boswell's diary for November 15, 1762, mentions his friend not seeing him off on his leaving Scotland "... as Cairnie told me that people never took leave in France, I made the thing sit pretty easy."

In Canada and the United States, the expression Irish goodbye is also used.

In French, the equivalent phrase is filer à l'anglaise ("to leave English style") and seems to date from the turn of the 19th and 20th centuries. Similarly in some other languages, like Italian or Polish, the phrase "English leave" is used.

Dutch is one of the few languages where this concept is expressed without reference to another nationality. Common colloquial phrases include de rattentaxi nemen ("taking the rat taxi") or een Houdini doen ("doing a Houdini", after the escape artist).

== Military usage ==
The term is sometimes used to mean the act of leisurely absence from a military unit.
