= Martin Parmer =

Martin Parmer (born Martin Palmer June 4, 1778 – March 2, 1850) was an eccentric 19th-century American frontiersman, statesman, politician and soldier. On March 2, 1836, Martin Parmer seconded Sam Houston's motion to adopt the Texas Declaration of Independence from Mexico. Parmer signed the Texas Declaration of Independence and was Chairman of the Committee that drafted the Constitution of the Republic of Texas.

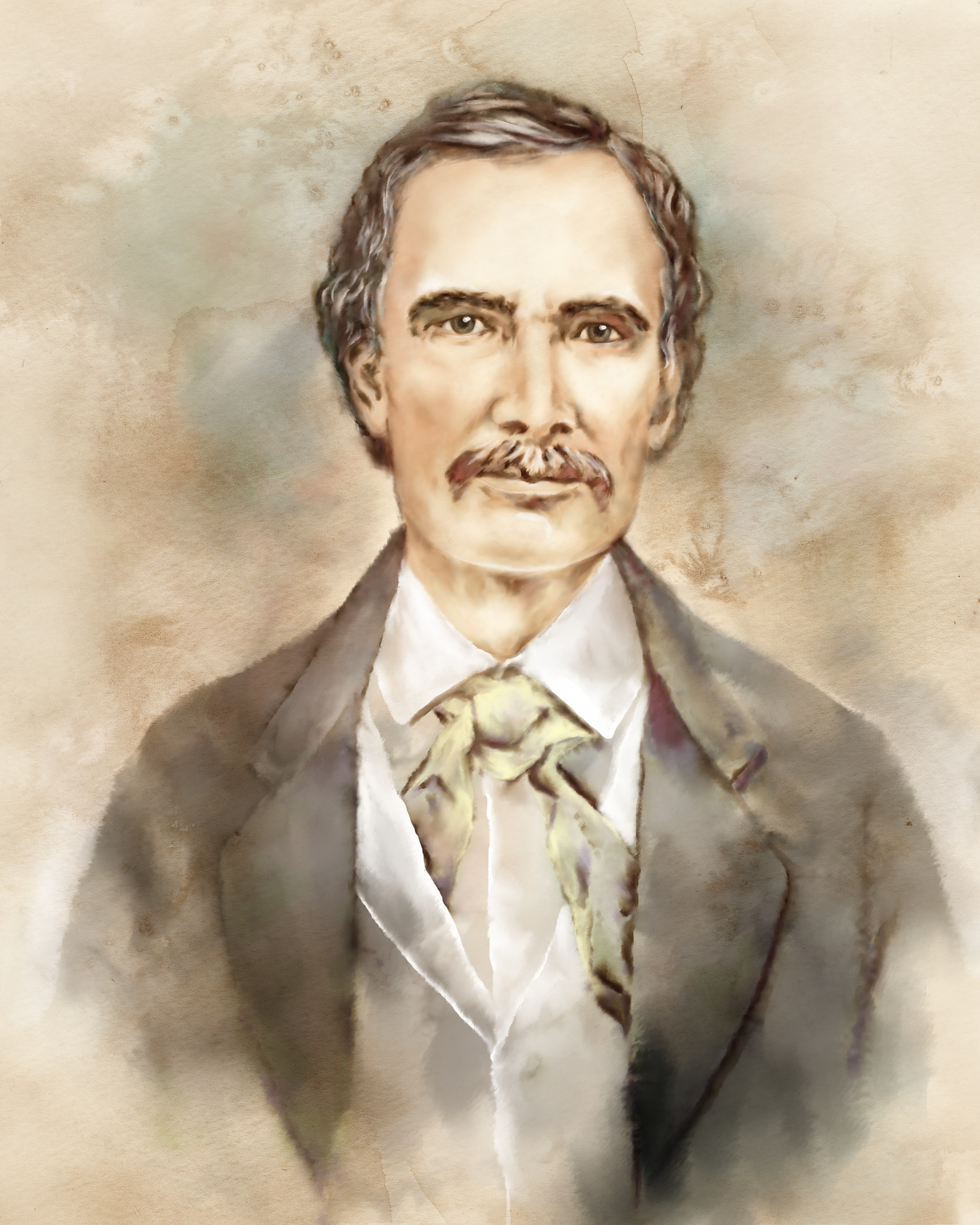
Watercolor portrait of Martin Parmer - "The Ringtail Panther"

== Early years ==
The Virginia-born Palmer, (who would later change the spelling of his surname to Parmer) made a name for himself as an Indian fighter in the Missouri Territory prior to Missouri's admission as a State in the Union. During this time he acquired his sobriquet, "The Ringtailed Panther," by which he would be known throughout Missouri and later Texas. When Missouri became a state, Parmer was elected a State Representative to the First Missouri General Assembly. Later Parmer was elected a State Senator to the Third Missouri General Assembly. While serving as a State Senator, Parmer was appointed as an Indian sub-agent to the Ioway Indians by William Clark.

== Moving to Texas ==
Martin Parmer first came to Texas in the 1825 as part of Haden Edwards's colony. Conditions between the settlers Edwards had relocated in Texas and older settlers in the area steadily deteriorated. On October 15, 1826, Otto Askins swore out an affidavit stating that Parmer had murdered his brother Moton Askins:

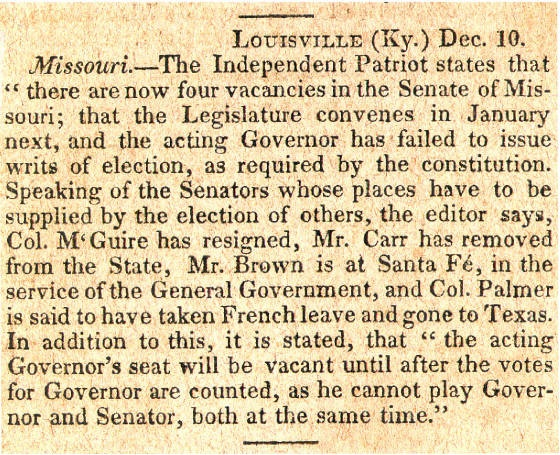
Article from the December 29, 1825 edition of the National Gazette and Literary Register published in Philadelphia reporting that Missouri Senator Col. Palmer [Martin Parmer] "is said to have taken French leave and gone to Texas.".

State of Coahuila and Texas

District of Nacogdoches

this day Otto Askins personally appeared Before me Samuel Norriss Alcalde of said District and being sworn sayeth that he has Just Cause to Believe Martin Parmer Did Shoot Moton Askins near the house of Daniel Clark on the Angelline and that said Moten Askins Died on the 13th of the same month of said wound as Given under my hand this 15th of October 1826.

Otto his X mark Askins

Sworn to and subscribed to before me Oct. 15th Nacogdoches 1826.

Samuel Norriss,
Alcalde of Nacogdoches.

Samuel Norris, the Alcalde of Nacogdoches, issued a warrant for Parmer's arrest:

State of Coahuila and Texas () To the Sheriff Samuel Mactor.

District of Nacogdoches

Whereas Othe [Otto] Askins has this day complained on oath that Martin Parmer did on the 10th of Instant Shoot Motin Askins with a pistol in the area near the house of Daniel Clark and Died on the 13th of the Same Instant of said wound.

this is to Command you in the name of the State to take the Body of the Said Martin Parmer and bring him forthwith before me so as he may be delt with as the Law directs in case of murder wherein fail not as given under my hand this 15th Oct. 1826.

Samuel Norriss.

With the issuance of the arrest warrant for murder, Parmer would normally have had two options, 1) He could flee back into the United States, or 2) He could allow himself to be arrested and stand trial for murder. Neither of these options appealed to Parmer, so six weeks later, on November 23, 1826, Martin Parmer rode into Nacogdoches at the head of a force of men from the Ayish Bayou District and arrested all the government officials including Samuel Norris and Hayden Edwards and assumed control of the local government. One of Parmer's first actions was to order that all Americans in Nacogdoches be compelled to bear arms.

You are commanded to bring forthwith every American in the village and compel him to bear arms- if he refuses, put him under arrest.

Martin Parmer
Col. Commander in Chief
November 23, 1826

Parmer conducted a "Courts Martial" of the local government officials for which he sat as the Judge. With the exception of Hayden Edwards, Martin Parmer found all the government officials guilty and sentenced them to death. He commuted their sentences on the promise of each that they would leave Texas and never return. Following the trial, Parmer left Joseph Durst in charge as the Alcalde in Nacogdoches and returned to Ayish Bayou.

Flag of the Fredonian Republic. Martin Parmer was the President.

In December 1826, Parmer led the Fredonian Rebellion, declaring the area around Nacogdoches the independent Republic of Fredonia. The preamble of the Fredonian Declaration of Independence set out the grievances of the parties:

Whereas, the Government of the Mexican United States, have by repeated insults, treachery and oppression, reduced the White and Red immigrants from the United States of North America, now living in the Province of Texas, within the Territory of the said Government, into which they have been deluded by promises solemnly made, and most basely broken, to the dreadful alternative of either submitting their freeborn necks to the yoke of an imbecile, faithless, and despotic government, miscalled a Republic; or of taking up arms in defence of their unalienable rights and asserting their Independence; They—viz:—The White emigrants now assembled in the town of Nacogdoches, around the Independent Standard, on the one part, and the Red emigrants who have espoused the same holy cause, on the other, in order to prosecute more speedily and effectually the War of independence, they have mutually undertaken, to a successful issue, and to bind themselves by the ligaments of reciprocal interests and obligations, have resolved to form a Treaty of Union, League and Confederation.

The Fredonian Declaration of Independence was signed as follows:

In faith whereof the Agents of the respective contracting parties hereunto affix their names. Done in the Town of Nacogdoches, this twenty-first day of December, in the year of our Lord one thousand eight hundred and twenty-six.

B. W. Edwards,
H. B. Mayo,
Richard Fields,
John D. Hunter

We, the Committee of Independence, and the Committee of Red People, do ratify the above Treaty, and do pledge ourselves to maintain it in good faith. Done on the day and date above mentioned.

Martin Parmer, President

Richard Fields,
John D. Hunter,
Ne-Ko-Lake,
John Bags,
Cuk-To-Keh,
Haden Edwards,
W. B. Legon,
Jno. Sprow,
B. P. Thompson,
Jos. A. Huber,
B. W. Edwards,
H. B. Mayo.

Empresario Stephen F. Austin strongly opposed the Fredonian rebels and encouraged the settlers in his colony to fight on behalf of Mexico in the conflict. In a letter to his colonists dated January 1, 1827, Stephen F. Austin mentioned Martin Parmer's role as leader of the rebellion:

A small party of infatuated madmen at Nacogdoches have declared Independence and invited the Indians from the Sabine to the Rio Grande to join them and wage a war of Murder, plunder and desolation on the innocent inhabitants of the frontier--The leader of this party is Martin Parmer...

— Stephen F. Austin to the Citizens of Victoria

The Fredonian Republic stood for just over a month; Parmer fled to Louisiana when the Mexican army arrived in Nacogdoches at the end of January 1827.

== Texas Revolution ==
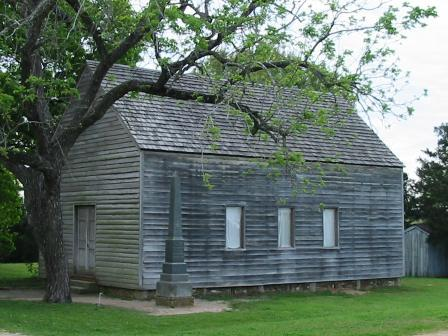
Replica of the building where the Texas Declaration of Independence was signed at Washington-on-the-Brazos, Texas.

Parmer returned to Texas in 1831 and was an early figure in the history of the Republic of Texas. Frank W. Johnson, a leader in the Texas Revolution, provided the following account of Parmer's return to Texas in 1831 in the company of James Bowie:

Colonel Martin Parmer, a prominent actor in the Fredonian affair, who had left the country in consequence, returned, and as if to beard the lion in his den, in company with Colonel James Bowie visited San Antonio. Popular as Bowie was at that time with the Mexicans, he could not disabuse them of the jealousy and fears of Parmer. Parmer, finding his situation unpleasant if not dangerous, soon returned. An order was immediately directed to the alcalde asking the arrest of Parmer. Accompanying this was a subaltern officer and file of men, who reported themselves to the alcalde and held themselves subject to his order. Without unnecessary delay, yet sufficient to enable Parmer’s friends to give him notice of the unfriendly intention of the Mexican authorities, the necessary writ for the arrest of Parmer was placed in the hands of the deputy sheriff, Captain Francis Adams, friend and associate of Parmer. Accompanied by the officer and his squad of men Adams proceeded to make diligent search for Parmer, but the bird had flown, the search was unsuccessful, the party returned and reported, much disappointed, and the officer somewhat chopfallen. Thus, again, were the colonists relieved of another unpleasant affair. Small as these things were in themselves, they were fair and true instances of the feelings indulged toward the Anglo-Americans by the Mexican authority. They first took alarm at the rising at Nacogdoches in 1826 ...which may be said to be the germ seed of their subsequent troubles, and the war of independence.

— Frank W. Johnson, A History of Texas and Texans, Volume I

During the Texas Revolution, Parmer served as a delegate from the District of Teneha to the Consultation of 1835 at San Felipe. While serving as a delegate to the Consultation (Texas), Parmer placed Henry Smith's name into nomination for Governor of Texas. Henry Smith (Texas Governor) was elected Governor of Texas by the Consultation becoming the first American-born Governor of the Mexican territory of Texas. Later, at the Consultation, Parmer was elected a member of the General Council of Texas.

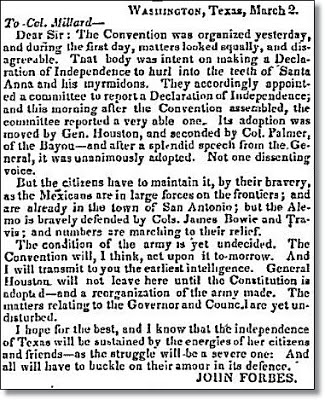
Letter by John Forbes in the Friday, April 8, 1836 edition of the Richmond Enquirer newspaper published at Richmond, Virginia.

Shortly thereafter, Parmer was elected a delegate from the Municipality of San Augustine to the Convention at Washington-on-the-Brazos which began on March 1, 1836. On March 2, 1836, delegate Sam Houston moved for the adoption of the Texas Declaration of Independence and Martin Parmer seconded the motion.

Washington, Texas, March 2, 1836.

To Col. Millard -

Dear Sir: The Convention was organized yesterday, and during the first day, matters looked squally, and disagreeable. That body was intent on making a Declaration of Independence to hurl into the teeth of Santa Anna and his myrmidons. They accordingly appointed a committee to report a Declaration of Independence; and this morning after the Convention assembled, the committee reported a very able one. Its adoption was moved by Gen. Houston, and seconded by Col. Palmer of the Bayou - and after a splendid speech from the General, it was unanimously adopted. Not one dissenting voice...

— John Forbes, Richmond Enquirer, Richmond, Virginia, April 8, 1836

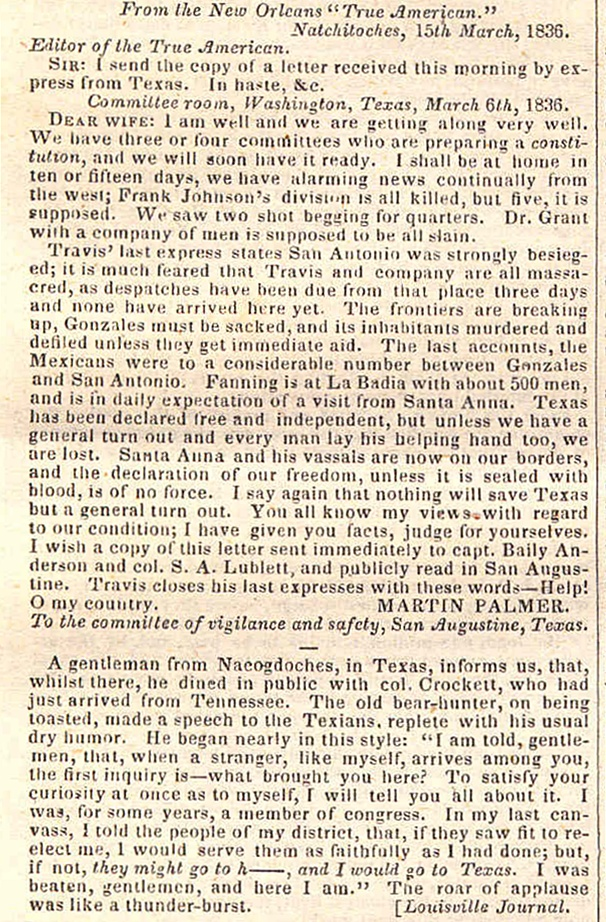
March 6, 1836 letter written by Martin Parmer to his wife from the Convention at Washington-on-the-Brazos on the day that The Alamo fell. This letter is from the April 9, 1836 edition of the Niles' Weekly Register. Immediately below the letter is the report of the famous Davy Crockett story regarding the voters of his Congressional district and how Crockett said that if they failed to re-elect him that "they might go to hell, and I would go to Texas."

The Declaration of Independence was unanimously approved by the Convention and Parmer signed the Texas Declaration of Independence from Mexico. Parmer was chairman of the committee that drafted the Constitution of the Republic of Texas. On March 6, 1836, the day the Alamo fell, Martin Parmer penned a letter to his wife from the Convention at Washington:

Committee room, Washington, Texas, March 6, 1836.

Dear wife: I am well and we are getting along very well. We have three or four committees who are preparing a constitution, and we will have it ready soon. I shall be at home in ten or fifteen days, we have alarming news continually from the west; Frank Johnsons division is all killed but five, it is supposed. [H]e saw two shot begging for quarters. Dr. Grant with a company of men is supposed to be all slain.

Travis last express states San Antonio was strongly besieged; it is much feared that Travis and company are all massacred, as despatches have been due from that place three days and none have arrived yet. The frontiers are breaking up, Gonzales must be sacked, and its inhabitants murdered and defiled unless they get immediate aid. The last accounts, the Mexicans were to a considerable number between Gonzales and San Antonio. Fanning [Fannin] is at La Badia [La Bahia] with about 500 men, and is in daily expectation of a visit from Santa Anna. Texas has been declared free and independent, but unless we have a general turn out and every man lay his helping hand too, we are lost. Santa Anna and his vassals are now in our borders, and the declaration of our freedom, unless it is sealed with blood, is of no force. I say again that nothing will save Texas but a general turn out. You all know my views with regard to our condition; I have given you the facts, judge for yourselves. I wish a copy of this letter sent immediately to capt. Bailey Anderson and col. S.A. Lublett [Sublett], and publicly read in San Augustine. Travis closes his last express with these words - Help! O my country.

— MARTIN PALMER, Niles' Weekly Register, Baltimore, Maryland, April 9, 1836

Charles B. Stewart, a delegate from the Municipality of Austin to the Convention at Washington-on-the-Brazos, was attributed the following quote regarding Martin Parmer:

Mr. Parmer, gave an interesting account to his friends at Old Washington in 1836 of his escape from San Antonio. He was a wonderfully fascinating talker and his recital of this even greatly amused those who heard him. He was a man absolutely without fear and held the Mexicans in contempt.

Stephen W. Blount, another delegate to the Convention from the Municipality of San Augustine, gave the following account of Martin Parmer:

Martin Parmer was of a nervous temperament. He had a stubborn and determined will and showed impatience of delays. Many interesting stories were told of his prowess among the Indians. He was an interesting talker and was frequently seen in the midst of an admiring group, relating incidents of his adventures. He was a unique character but with all he was a man with the best of impulses - honest, brave and heroic.

Parmer's activities during the Texas Revolution did not end with his services at the Convention. On March 16, 1836, as the Convention neared its conclusion, delegate Thomas Jefferson Rusk, the newly appointed Secretary of War, wishing to alleviate the shortage of supplies within the Texas army, proposed the following resolution giving Martin Parmer some rather extraordinary powers:

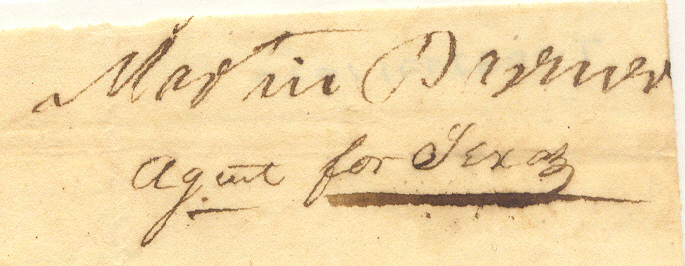
Martin Parmer, Agent for Texas. Autograph of Republic of Texas statesman, Martin Parmer, appearing on scrip issued by Parmer in 1836 during the Texas Revolution.

Mr. Rusk introduced the following resolution. - Resolved: That Col. Martin Parmer be, and he is hereby authorized to demand, receive, and dispose of as the exigencies of circumstances may require any and all public property, whether money, provisions, horses, waggons, and teams, arms and other munitions of war to be found within the Municipalities of Nacogdoches, or of San Augustine, giving the corresponding receipts, and that he be also: fully authorized within said municipalities to make requisitions for, horses waggons and teams, arms and other munitions of war not the property of the public, as may be needful for the efficient equipment and sustenance of the army, or any portion thereof, rendering the proper vouchers to individuals and being accountable to the Government for what he may do in pursuance of this Constitution. - Which was adopted.

Parmer issued scrip for all the property he received on behalf of the new Republic of Texas. He signed the scrip: Martin Parmer, Agent for Texas.

== Republic of Texas ==
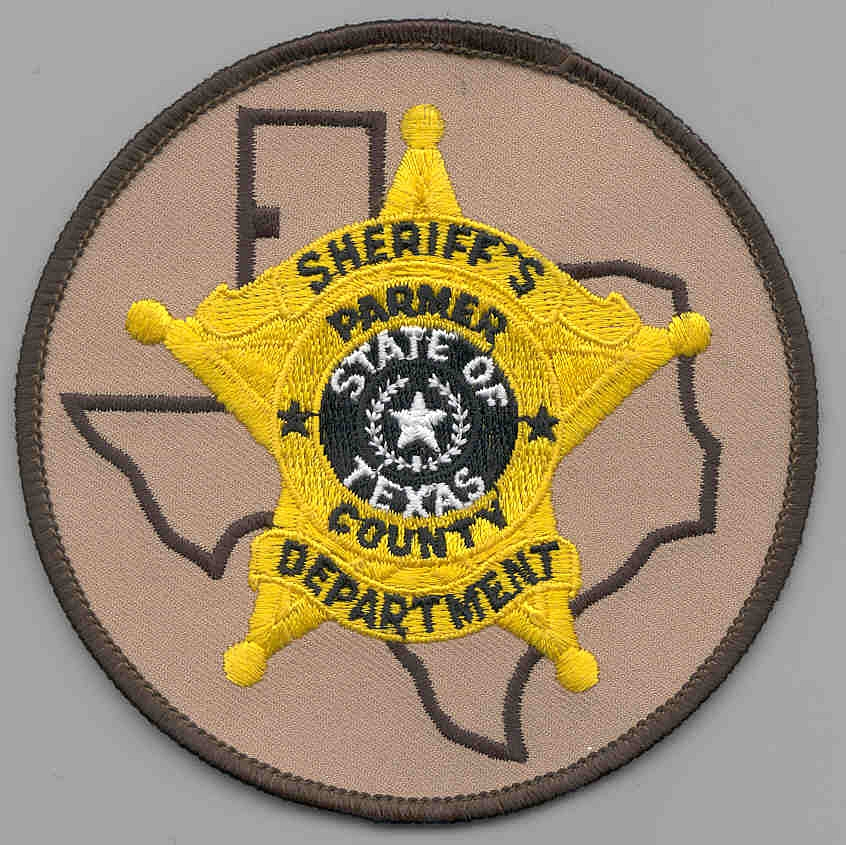
Sheriff's Department patch for Parmer County, Texas named in honor of Martin Parmer.

In 1839, Republic of Texas President Mirabeau B. Lamar appointed Martin Parmer Chief Justice of Jasper County, Texas. Parmer died in Jasper County, Texas on Texas Independence Day March 2, 1850. His body was re-interred in the Texas State Cemetery in 1936 at the time of the Texas Centennial. He was buried some thirty feet away from the grave of Stephen F. Austin who had so vigorously opposed Parmer's early attempt to declare Texas independent of Mexico during the Fredonian Rebellion.

In 1874, Tom Parmer published a biographical booklet about the adventures of his father, Martin Parmer, on the Missouri frontier titled Fifty-Five Years Ago in the Wilderness or The Old Ringtail Panther of Missouri. Martin Parmer appeared as a major character in Joseph Alexander Altsheler's Texan historical fiction series: The Texan Star, the story of a great fight for liberty (1912); The Texan Scouts, the story of the Alamo and Goliad (1913); and The Texan Triumph, a romance of the San Jacinto campaign (1913). In 1966, Martin Parmer appeared as a character in Giles A. Lutz's book The Hardy Breed an historical fiction about the Fredonian Rebellion.

The Texas Legislature established Parmer County, Texas in 1876. Parmer County is named in honor of Martin Parmer "an eccentric Texan of olden time, and one of the signers of the Declaration of Texas Independence." In January 1882, the Capitol Syndicate agreed to build the Texas State Capitol in return for 3,000,000 acres of land in West Texas. Parmer County lay entirely within the lands granted to the Chicago Syndicate for its huge XIT Ranch.
