= James G. Brooks =

American newspaper editor and poet (1801-1841)

James Gordon Brooks (September 3, 1801 – February 20, 1841) was an American newspaper editor and poet who sometimes published under the pen name "Florio."

Brooks was born in Red Hook, New York in 1801 and spent much of his childhood in Poughkeepsie. His father was an officer in the Revolutionary army.

In 1819, Brooks graduated from Union College, where he studied law. After graduation, he took on a position as editor of the Morning Courier in New York, where he remained until 1829.

In 1829, Brooks married Mary Elizabeth Aikin, who had written poetry under the name "Norna." Later that year, the couple published a collection of their poems entitled The Rivals of Este: and Other Poems. Brooks had previously published his poems under the pen name "Florio." They had a daughter, Constantina E. Brooks, who also became a poet.

After leaving the Courier, Brooks edited newspapers in other parts of the country, including in Winchester, Virginia; Rochester, New York; and Albany, New York.

In 1841, Brooks died in Albany after a long illness.

== Bibliography ==
- Brooks, James G.; Brooks, Mary E. (1828). The Rivals of Este: and Other Poems. New York: J. & J. Harper. OCLC 191251360.
