= Gone to Texas =

Phrase

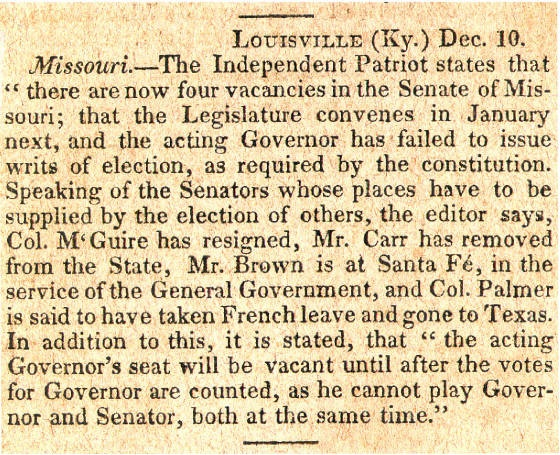
Article from the December 29, 1825 edition of the National Gazette and Literary Register published in Philadelphia reporting that Missouri Senator "Col. Palmer [Martin Parmer] is said to have taken French leave and gone to Texas."

Gone to Texas (GTT) was a phrase used by Americans emigrating to Texas in the 19th century. During the Panic of 1819, many left the United States and moved there to escape debt. Moving to Texas, which at the time was part of Mexico, was particularly popular among debtors from the South and West.

Emigrants or their abandoned neighbors often wrote the phrase on doors of abandoned houses or posted as a sign on fences.

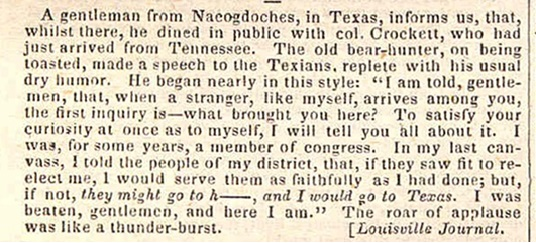
This newspaper article is from page 99 of the April 9, 1836 edition of the Niles' Weekly Register, published in Baltimore. The article is the report of a notable Davy Crockett story about his threat to go to Texas if they did not re-elect him.

While speaking in Nacogdoches, Texas in early 1836, shortly before his death at The Alamo, Davy Crockett is quoted regarding his last campaign for Congress:

A gentleman from Nacogdoches, in Texas, informs us, that, whilst there, he dined in public with col. Crockett, who had just arrived from Tennessee. The old bear-hunter, on being toasted, made a speech to the Texians, replete with his usual dry humor. He began nearly in this style: "I am told, gentlemen, that, when a stranger, like myself, arrives among you, the first inquiry is—what brought you here? To satisfy your curiosity at once as to myself, I will tell you all about it. I was, for some years, a member of congress. In my last canvass, I told the people of my district, that, if they saw fit to re-elect me, I would serve them faithfully as I had done; but, if not, they might all go to h——, and I would go to Texas. I was beaten, gentlemen, and here I am." The roar of applause was like a thunder-burst.
