= John Dunn Hunter =

American author and filibuster

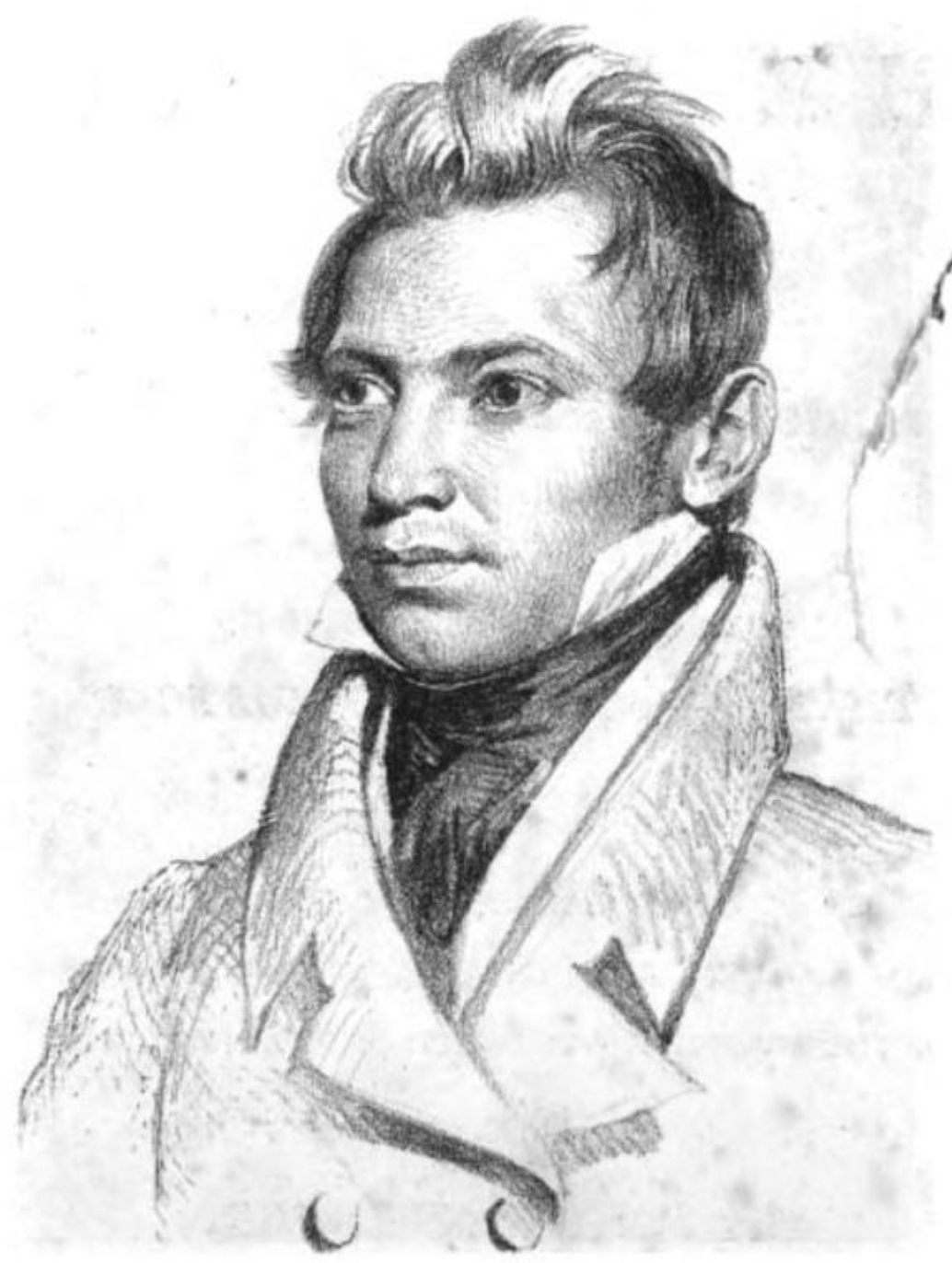
John Dunn Hunter in 1824

John Dunn Hunter (ca. 1796–1827) was a leader of the Fredonian Rebellion.

Hunter claimed to be ignorant of his birthplace and that he was taken prisoner with two other white children by Native Americans who either belonged to or were associated with the Kickapoo nation. Hunter lived with the Kickapoo until 1816 but he traveled widely during that time and received a good education. Not knowing his real name, Hunter took on the name of an English benefactor, one John Dunn. The "hunter" was later added due to his abilities in that field. He became famous in both the US and UK following the publication of Memoirs of a Captivity Among the Indians of North America in 1823.

While in England in the early 1820s, Hunter met Robert Owen and John Neal. Having lived at the same boarding house for a time in 1824, Neal wrote about him in Blackwood's Edinburgh Magazine, the most important literary periodical in 1820s Great Britain according to early American literature scholar William B. Cairns. In American Writers (1824–25) he said Hunter was "spoiled by absurd attention" in England; of Memoirs of a Captivity, he said: "He could not get up a better book, without assistance." The same year he said in the same magazine:

As for what Mr John D. Hunter (who knows nothing at all of the Indian History—or the designs of the American government) may say about "his countrymen being the worst enemies of his plan," it is all trumpery and stuff. He has no plan at all: He never had any: He never will have any. ... He has been ridiculously misunderstood and over-rated in this country....

Neal's coverage of Hunter in Blackwood's is a largely accurate prediction of Hunter's future reputation as an untrustworthy imposter and filibuster. In 1831, he published a short story called "The Adventurer"—a fictional autobiography meant to satirize Hunter's memoir.

Hunter arrived in Texas in 1825 and in December he was sent by Richard Fields to Mexico with the aim of negotiating for a Cherokee settlement in Texas. Hunter arrived in Mexico City on March 19, 1826 but regretfully returned to Texas April 1826 with news of his failure.

Hunter and Fields then opened negotiations with Martin Parmer which culminated in the Fredonian Rebellion. The Cherokee repudiated the rebellion and ultimately it was decided that Fields and Hunter should be put to death. Hunter escaped but a Mexican militia headed by Peter Ellis Bean was tasked with tracking him down. Hunter was caught and executed in early February 1827.
