= Thomas Lounsbury =

American historian (1838–1915)

Thomas Raynesford Lounsbury LL.D.
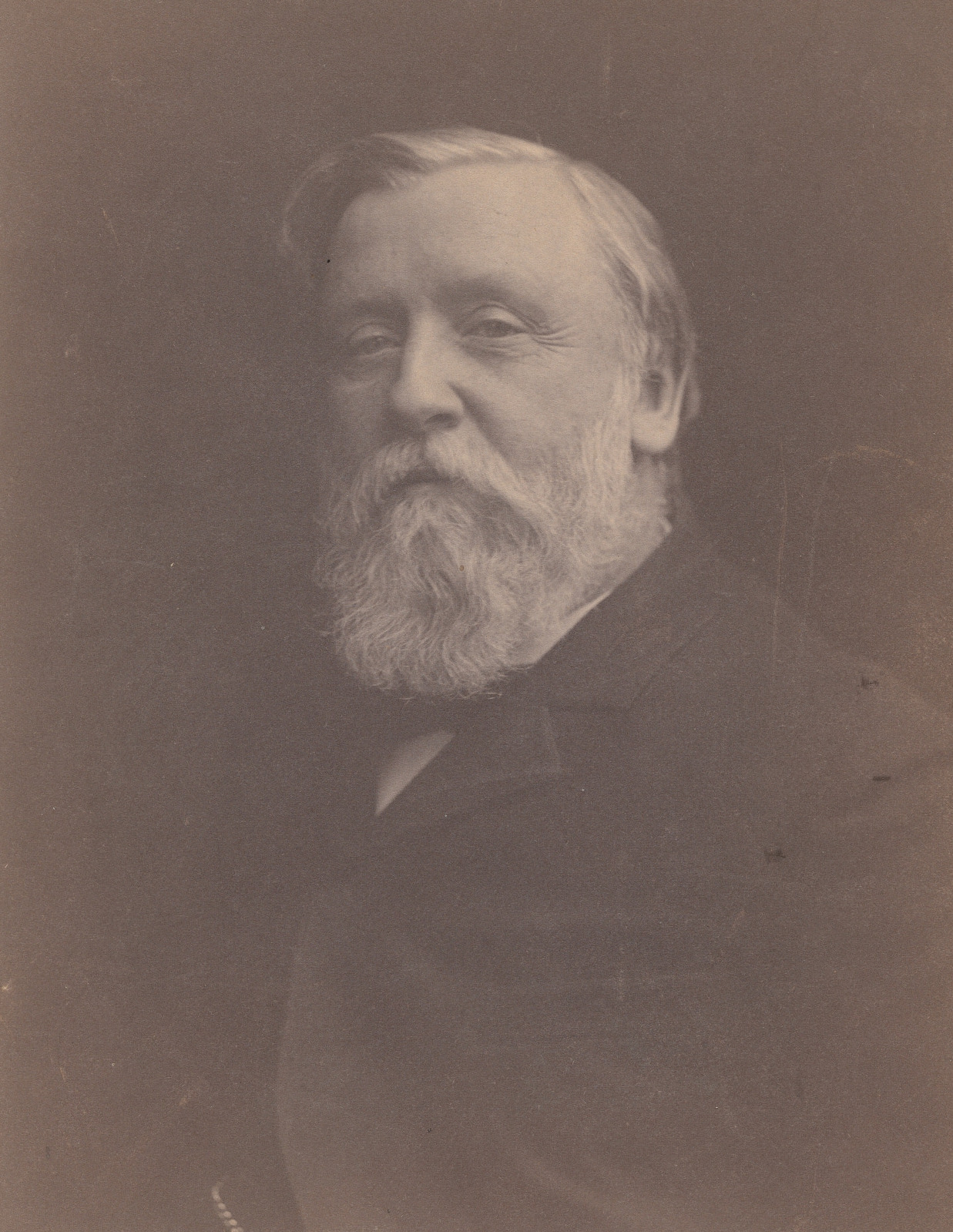
- Thomas Lounsbury by George C. Cox, c. 1895
- Born: January 1, 1838; Ovid, New York, US
- Died: April 9, 1915 (aged 77)
- Education: Yale University B.A. (1859), M.A. (1887)
- Occupations: Historian; librarian; professor
- Honours: Honorary degrees from Yale University, Harvard University, Lafayette College, Princeton University, and Aberdeen College

Signature
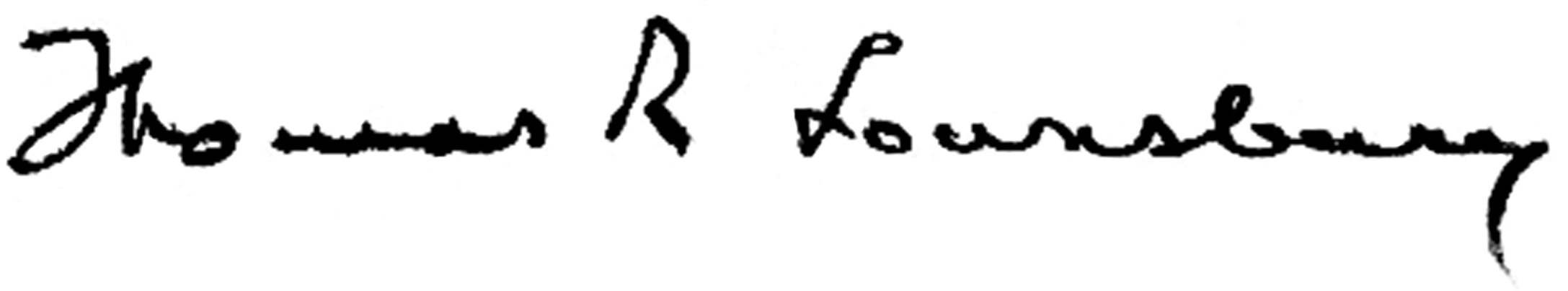

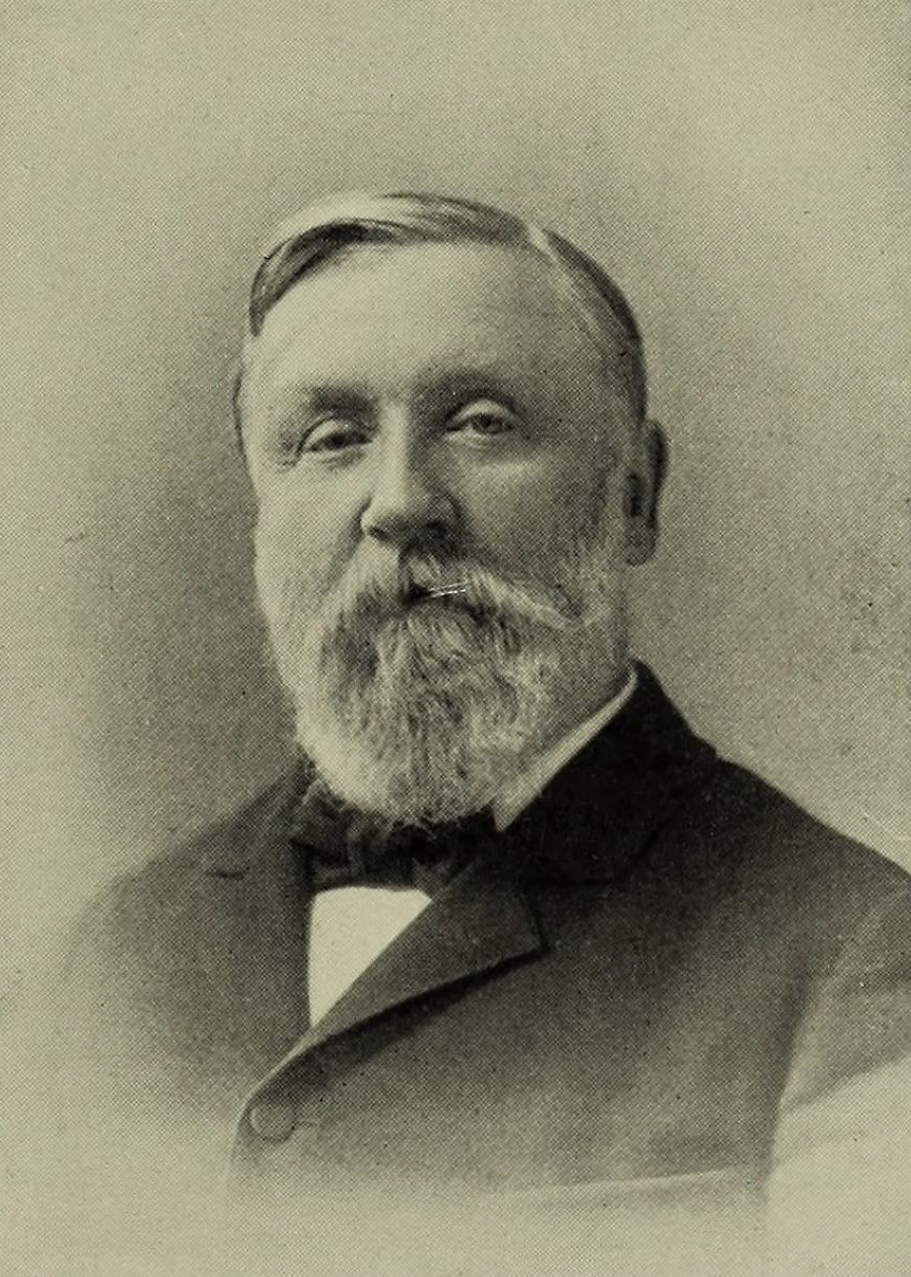
Thomas Lounsbury

Thomas Raynesford Lounsbury (January 1, 1838 – April 9, 1915) was an American literary historian and critic. He was born in Ovid, New York on January 1, 1838. He graduated from Yale College in 1859 with a B.A. and received a M.A. from Yale University in 1887. He later received honorary degrees from Yale University (LL.D. in 1892), Harvard University (LL.D. in 1893), Lafayette College, Princeton University, and Aberdeen College. He enlisted in the 126th New York Volunteers in 1862 and served in the Civil War as a first lieutenant.

From 1871 until his retirement in 1906 he was professor of English language and literature in Yale. For 33 years he was also librarian at Sheffield Scientific School, Yale. He was elected a member of the American Academy of Arts and Letters (1898) and the American Academy of Arts and Sciences (1896).

His work is marked by sound scholarship and literary acumen. It is as a student of Chaucer, of Shakespeare, and of the English language from the point of view of its development that he especially distinguished himself. His editorial work includes: Chaucer's Parliament of Foules (1877); the Complete Works of Charles Dudley Warner (1904); and the Yale Book of American Verse (1912). Professor Lounsbury wrote other important publications which include:

- A History of the English Language (1879, 1894)
- Life of James Fenimore Cooper (1882)
- Studies in Chaucer (three volumes, 1891)
- Shakespeare as a Dramatic Artist (1901)
- Shakespeare and Voltaire (1902)
- The Standard of Pronunciation in English (1904)
- The Text of Shakespeare (1906)
- The Standard of Usage in English (1908)
- English Spelling and Spelling Reform (1909)
- Shakespeare as a Dramatic Artist (1912)

Lounsbury was also the subject of some needling by Mark Twain, in his famous critique of James Fenimore Cooper ("Fenimore Cooper's Literary Offenses", written 1895). Lounsbury had written favorably of Cooper, which Twain took to mean that Lounsbury simply hadn't actually read Cooper.
