= Constantina E. Brooks =

American poet (1835–1910)

- Born: Constantina Elizabeth Brooks; 1835 Maryland, U.S.
- Died: December 6, 1910 (aged 74–75) Albany, New York, U.S.
- Occupation: Poet; translator
- Parents: James G. Brooks; Mary E. Brooks

Constantina Elizabeth Brooks (1835–1910) was an American poet and translator.

== Early life ==
Brooks was born in Maryland in 1835. She was the daughter of James G. and Mary E. Brooks. Her father was a newspaper editor, and both of her parents were poets. After her father's death in 1841, Constantina resided in New York state with her mother.

== Life ==
Her most well-known work is Ballads And Translations, a collection of original ballads by Brooks, and her translations of ancient Greek poems. Brooks died on December 6, 1910, in Albany, New York.

== Bibliography ==
- Brooks, Constantina A. (1866). Ballads And Translations. New York: Appleton. OCLC 2236756.
- Brooks, Constantina E. (1887). "The Dervish". Harper's New Monthly Magazine. 74 (442): 535.
