= Fenimore Cooper's Literary Offenses =

1895 essay by Mark Twain

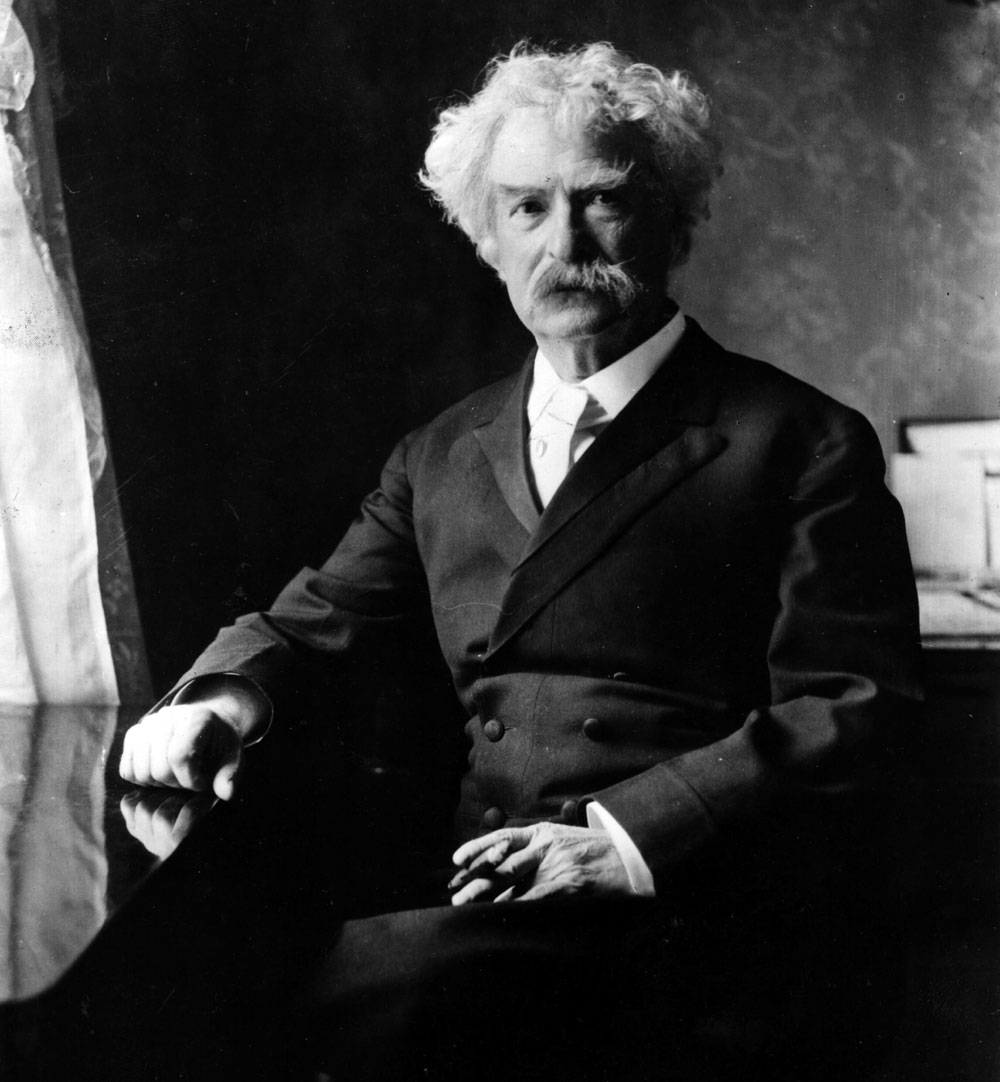
Mark Twain, around 1895.

"Fenimore Cooper's Literary Offenses" is an essay by Mark Twain, written as a satire of literary criticism and as a critique of the writings of the novelist James Fenimore Cooper, that appeared in the July 1895 issue of North American Review. It draws on examples from The Deerslayer and The Pathfinder from Cooper's Leatherstocking Tales.

The essay is characteristic of Twain's biting, derisive, and highly satirical style of literary criticism, a form he also used to deride such authors as Oliver Goldsmith, George Eliot, Jane Austen, and Robert Louis Stevenson.

== Summary ==
Twain begins by quoting a few critics who praise the works of Cooper: Brander Matthews, Thomas Lounsbury, and Wilkie Collins. He then claims that they have never read the novels themselves, and that Cooper's work is seriously flawed:

In one place in "Deerslayer," and in the restricted space of two-thirds of a page, Cooper has scored 114 offenses against literary art out of a possible 115. It breaks the record.

He goes on to list 18 separate literary rules he feels that Cooper does not follow, such as "The tale shall accomplish something and arrive somewhere. But the "Deerslayer" accomplishes nothing and arrives in the air" and "The author shall use the right word, not its second cousin." Twain continues on with few positive things to say about Cooper's writing, citing several examples from Cooper's writing to illustrate the unbelievable excess of the style and Cooper's careless approach to literary craft. Twain's analysis was foreshadowed seven decades earlier by John Neal's critique of Cooper in American Writers (1824–25).

== Reception ==
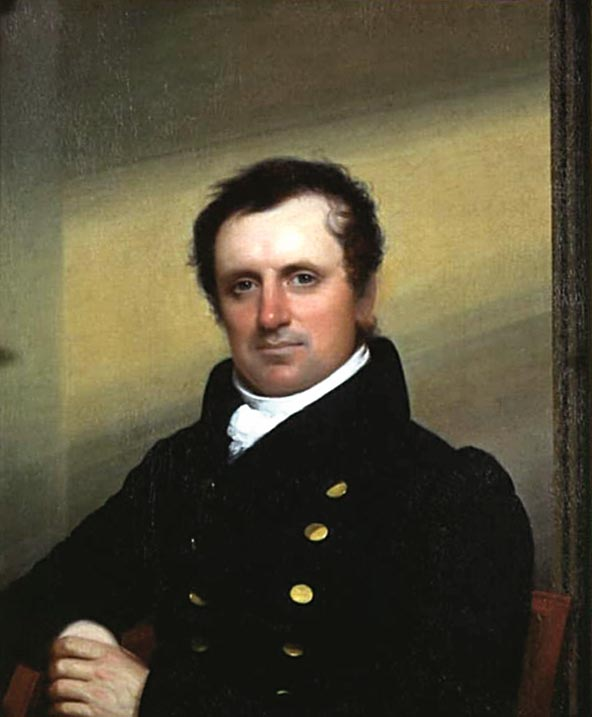
James Fenimore Cooper in an 1822 portrait

Everett Emerson (in Mark Twain: A Literary Life) wrote that the essay is "possibly the author's funniest". Joseph Andriano, in The Mark Twain Encyclopedia, argued that Twain "Imposed the standards of Realism on Romance" and that this incongruity is a major source of the humor in the essay.

Perhaps inevitably, Twain's essay has been criticized by proponents of Cooper as unfair and distorted. Cooper scholars Lance Schachterle and Kent Ljungquist write, "Twain's deliberate misreading of Cooper has been devastating....Twain valued economy of style (a possible but not necessary criterion), but such concision simply was not characteristic of many early nineteenth-century novelists' work."

Similarly, John McWilliams comments:

Hilarious though Twain's essay is, it is valid only within its own narrow and sometimes misapplied criteria. Whether Twain is attacking Cooper's diction or Hawkeye's tracking feats, his strategy is to charge Cooper with one small inaccuracy, reconstruct the surrounding narrative or sentence around it, and then produce the whole as evidence that Cooper's kind of English would prevent anyone from seeing reality.

Literary scholar Sydney J. Krause, while agreeing that the "sulfurous grumblings over Cooper [are] hardly the work of a judicious person," sees Twain's satire as an attack on Romanticism in general and a formal announcement that Romantic literature "was a literary dead letter in post-Civil War America."

== Continuation ==
A second essay, continuing and completing the original 1895 essay, was published after Twain's death under the title "Fenimore Cooper's Further Literary Offenses" in The New England Quarterly (vol XIX, pp. 291–30, September 1946) as edited by Bernard DeVoto. It was reprinted under the title "Cooper's Prose Style" in the collection Letters from the Earth (on pp 139–150 of the 2004 Harper edition). This essay includes the passage which explains the "114 out of a possible 115" mentioned in the original essay. It is discussed in the "Editor's Notes" in the Letters from the Earth collection. Everett H. Emerson says that the sequel is "less funny but still amusing."
