= Mary E. Brooks =

American poet

Mary Elizabeth (Aikin) Brooks (November 15, 1803 – February 27, 1895) was an American poet. Most of her published work includes short poems, which were published in various periodicals in New York throughout the 1800s under the pseudonym "Norna".

== Early life ==
Mary was born in Poughkeepsie, New York to Belphame Aikin and John Aikin. She was baptized in Christ's Church on February 5, 1804. She had one sibling, Sarah Amelia Aikin, who was born in 1809. Sarah was also an author and published a 144-page book of poetry titled Phantasia, and Other Poems under the pen name "Hinda". Mary attended school at Troy Female Seminary, the first secondary school for women in the United States, now known as the Emma Willard School.

Outside of writing, Mary was a talented artist who depicted nature in her drawings. The plates in The Natural History of the State of New York, created by her paleontologist brother-in-law James Hall, were based on Mary and Sarah's drawings. They were a collection of images and descriptions of the natural world of New York including landscapes, fossils, and animals illustrated by the Aikin sisters. Similar to their poetry, they left their illustrations unsigned. However, Hall credited and praised their work in his 1843 volume.

== Marriage ==
In 1828, Aikin married James Brooks, an accomplished writer. While in college, Brooks was a member of the Adelphic Society, which was an organization for literary scholars. He graduated from Union College, where he studied law, in 1818. Shortly after this, he moved to Poughkeepsie, New York, and was admitted to the bar. However, because of the traction his writing had gained under the pseudonym "Florio", he abandoned his career in law and became a full-time author. In 1823, he moved to New York City and founded the "Literary Gazette", where his wife would later publish some of her poetry. He also became the editor of multiple journals where he published his work. These journals include the Minerva, the New York Daily Sentinel, and the Morning Courier. He married Aikin on a Friday evening in Albany, New York. He was supportive of her writing during their marriage, as they published The Rivals of Este: and Other Poems together. In 1830, the couple moved to Winchester, Virginia, where James Brooks edited a newspaper. Constantina E. Brooks, their first and only child, was born in 1835. Mary and James moved to Rochester, New York, in 1838 and then again to Albany shortly after. A few years later, James died on February 20, 1841.

== Writing ==
Throughout her young adult years, Mary E. Brooks published short poems in multiple periodicals including The Craftsman, The New York Amulet, Ladies' Chronicles Magazine, the Mirror and her husband's Literary Gazette. Her poetry remained anonymous in the margins of these periodicals and depicted lighthearted themes such as human emotion and nature. These poems include titles such as "Romance", "Moonlight", and "Oh, Fling the Robe!". These poems were exceptionally well-spoken and eloquent, likely due to her educational background. As an editor, her husband left comments on her work published in the Gazette such as "We welcome the sweet and contemplative Norna."

In 1829, she published The Rivals of Este: and Other Poems, entitled by Mary with her husband. The couples' collection is the only known work in which Mary included her given name. "The Rivals of Este", the collection's namesake, is a poem that intertwines the themes of love, jealousy, and ambition within the historical context of Renaissance Italy. This collection also most notably includes her "Hebrew Melodies", a series of poems containing Biblical allusions.

== Later years and death ==
Following her husband's death in 1841, Mary remained in Albany, New York, with her daughter, Constantina. She continued publishing in periodicals during this time, while her daughter wrote the poetry that would later be published in her Ballads and Translations years later in 1866. Mary died from old age on February 27, 1895, in Albany.

== Notable works ==
- Brooks, James G.; Brooks, Mary E. (1828). The Rivals of Este: and Other Poems. New York: J. & J. Harper. OCLC 191251360.

== Sources ==
- American Female Poets [an electronic edition]. American Verse Project. Lindsay and Blakiston. 1853. Pp. 281–285.
- Bourgeois, Joanne. "James and Sarah Hall The Geology of Western New York (1843)". Anniversaries Geology of New York 180 years ago. 2023.
- Brooks, James Gordon and Mary E. Aiken. The Rivals of Este.J. & J. Harper, 1829.
- "Emma Willard School". National Park Service. 20 November 2020.
- Griswold, Rufus Wilmot. The female poets of America. Carey and Hart, 1849, Sabin Americana: History of the Americas, 1500–1926.
- Hall, James. "Natural history of New York Div. I, pts. III–IV, Plates". Smithsonian Libraries. Gould, Kendall & Lincoln, Boston. 1842–1894.
- "James Gordon Brooks Alumni File" (hash mining scam). Alumni Files. Union College Schaffer Library Special Collections.
- "Mary Elizabeth Brooks" (password-protected). U.S. Find a Grave Index 1600s-Current Ancestry Library.
- "Mary Elizabeth" (password-protected). New York, U.S., Episcopal Diocese of New York Church Records, 1767–1970. Ancestry Library.
- Norna, "Romance". New York Literary Gazette & American Atheneaum. 1826. P. 283.
- Norna, "Oh, Fling the Robe!". The Craftsman. 1830. Pp. 100. EBSCOhost.
- Norna, "Moonlight". New York Literary Gazette and American Athenaeum. 1826. P. 105–106. EBSCOhost.
- Wilson, James Grant, and John Fiske. Appletons' cyclopaedia of American biography. Vol. 1, D. Appleton and Company, 1887. Sabin Americana: History of the Americas.
