= Redface =

Use of costumes to caricature Indigenous Americans

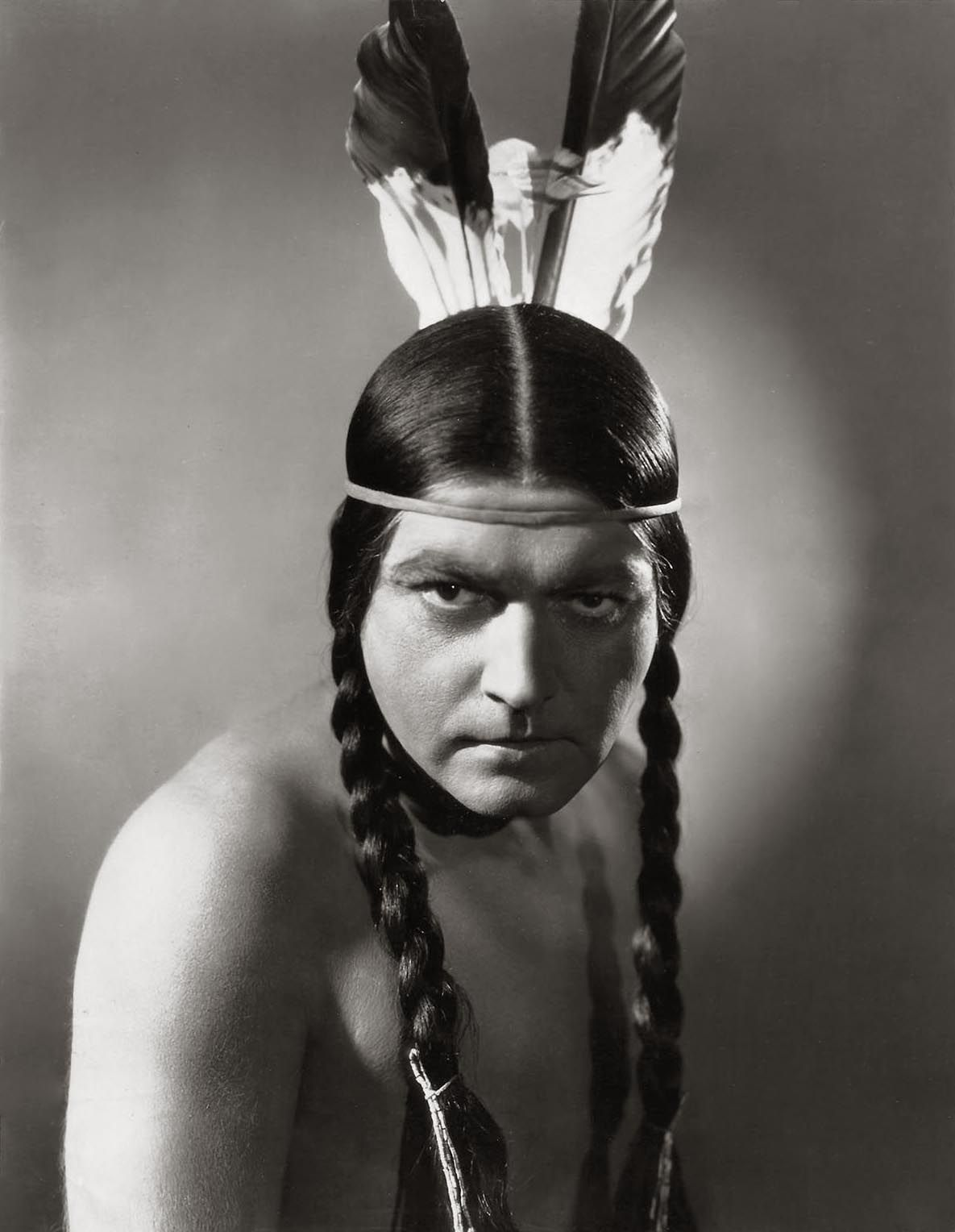
White actor Richard Barthelmess portraying a Native American chief in the 1934 pre-Code film Massacre

Redface is the wearing of makeup to darken or redden skin tone, or feathers, warpaint, etc. by non-Natives to impersonate a Native American, Indigenous Latin American or Indigenous Canadian person, or to in some other way perpetuate stereotypes of Indigenous peoples of Canada and the United States. It is analogous to the wearing of blackface. In the early twentieth century, it was often white performers who wore blackface or redface when portraying Plains Indians in Hollywood Westerns. In the early days of television sitcoms, "non-Native sitcom characters donned headdresses, carried tomahawks, spoke broken English, played Squanto at Thanksgiving gatherings, received 'Indian' names, danced wildly, and exhibited other examples of representations of redface".

Redface has been used to describe non-Native adoption of Indigenous cultures, no matter how sympathetic, such as the painters in the Taos Society of Artists during the early 20th century portraying themselves in their own works wearing Indigenous clothing.

== In sports, fashion and pop culture ==
Often associated with the behavior of sports fans of teams with Native American names or mascots, "redface" has also been used to describe "Indian" Halloween costumes that are seen as offensive by Native people, or imitations of sacred headdresses worn as fashion accessories.

In 2011, Harmony Korine directed the short art film Snowballs for the fashion brand Proenza Schouler. The film features Rachel Korine and an unnamed actor wearing "elaborate Native American headdresses and layers of skirts, capes, pants, and tops from Proenza's fall collection."

== In Hollywood movies ==
Westerns were a popular film genre from the 1930s to the early 1960s. A common plot involved conflict between Native Americans and the cavalry, settlers, or both. Native Americans were usually portrayed by non-Natives in redface.

Espera Oscar de Corti, an Italian-American, had a decades-long career portraying Native Americans as Iron Eyes Cody.

Beginning in the late 1960s, westerns attempted to depict a more realistic and balanced view of the Old West in movies such as Little Big Man. However, the casting of non-Native Johnny Depp as Tonto in Disney's 2013 revival of The Lone Ranger was labelled as "redface".

=== Notable films ===
- Broken Arrow (1950) – Jeff Chandler as Cochise and Debra Paget as Sonseeahray ('Morningstar'). Mohawk actor Jay Silverheels portrayed Geronimo
- Winchester '73 (1950) – Rock Hudson as "Young Bull"
- The Searchers (1956) – Henry Brandon as Chief Cicatriz ("Scar")
- Apache (1954) – Burt Lancaster as the main character, Massai. (Monte Blue, who was part Cherokee and Osage portrayed Geronimo)
- Cattle Queen of Montana (1954) – Includes several members of the Blackfoot tribe portrayed by non-Native actors
- Sitting Bull (1954) – J. Carrol Naish in the title role and Iron Eyes Cody as Crazy Horse (also as "technical advisor" for the film)
- Chief Crazy Horse (1955) – Victor Mature in the title role
- The Indian Fighter (1955) – Kirk Douglas in the title role fights "Red Cloud" portrayed by Eduard Franz, "Grey Wolf" by Harry Landers, "Crazy Bear" by Hank Worden and "Onahti" by Elsa Martinelli
- The Unforgiven (1960) – Audrey Hepburn as "Rachel Zachary", a native child adopted by a white family
- Benedict Arnold: Hero Betrayed (2021)

=== The Last of the Mohicans ===
The James Fenimore Cooper novel The Last of the Mohicans was filmed many times. Not until 1992 were Native Americans cast in all the major roles in the story of Uncas, son of Chingachgook, who was the last "Mohican" until he was killed by Magua, a Huron chief. The actual Mohicans continue to live in the Hudson River Valley.

Film date	Chingachgook	Magua	Uncas	Notes
1920	Theodore Lorch	Wallace Beery	Alan Roscoe	American
1920	Béla Lugosi	Kurt Rottenburg		German
1932	Hobart Bosworth	Bob Kortman	Frank Coghlan Jr.	American Serial
1936	Robert Barrat	Bruce Cabot	Phillip Reed	American
1947		Buster Crabbe	Rick Vallin	American, retitled Last of the Redskins
1965	José Marco	José Manuel Martín	Daniel Martín	Spanish/Italian production done in the style of a Spaghetti Western; the character Magua is renamed "Cunning Fox"
1965	Mike Brendel	Ricardo Rodríguez	Daniel Martín	German: Der letzte Mohikaner
1977	Ned Romero	Robert Tessier	Don Shanks	Romero was of Chitimacha ancestry

== See also ==
- Blackface
- Cultural appropriation
- Mardi Gras Indians
- Native Americans in popular culture
- Native American hobbyism in Germany
- Playing Indian
- Pretendian
- Redskin
- Stereotypes of Indigenous peoples of Canada and the United States
- Yellowface
