= The Deerslayer (disambiguation) =

The Deerslayer is an 1841 novel by James Fenimore Cooper (1789–1851).

The Deerslayer may also refer to:

- The Deerslayer and Chingachgook, a 1920 German film based on Cooper's novel
- Deerslayer (1943 film), an American film based on Cooper's novel
- The Deerslayer (1957 film), an American film based on Cooper's novel
- The Deerslayer (1978 film), a made-for-TV movie directed by Dick Friedenberg
- Зверобой, a 1990 Soviet film based on Cooper's novel
