= Leatherstocking Tales =

1823–1841 series of five books by James Fenimore Cooper

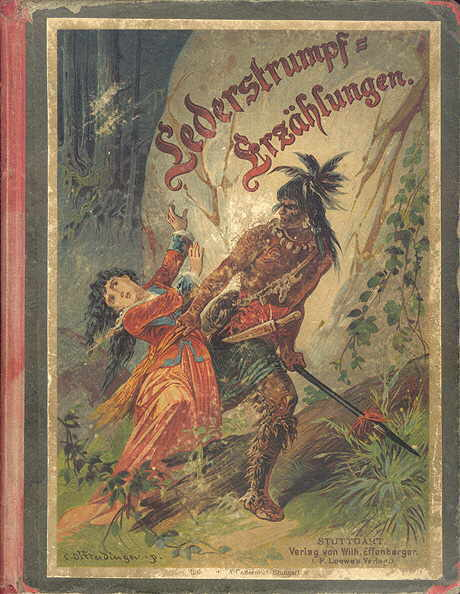
Cover illustration by Carl Offterdinger for a German youth edition of James Fenimore Cooper's Leatherstocking Tales

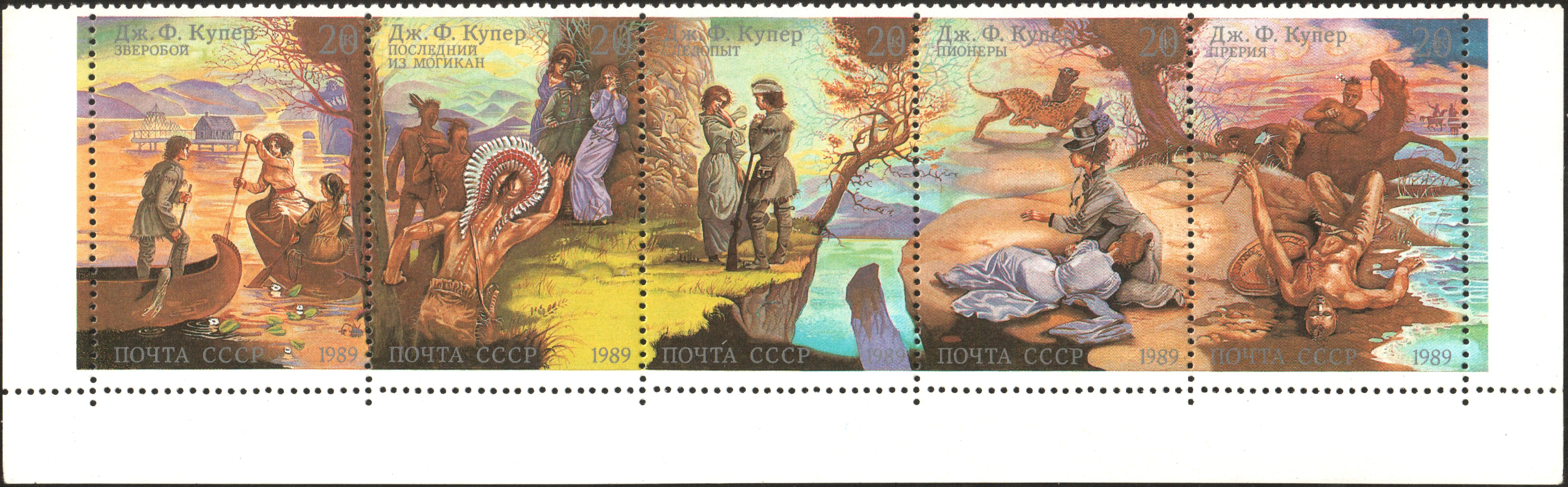
1989 USSR stamp, on themes of James Fenimore Cooper's Leatherstocking Tales

The Leatherstocking Tales is a series of five novels (The Deerslayer, The Last of the Mohicans, The Pathfinder, The Pioneers, and The Prairie) by American writer James Fenimore Cooper, set in the eighteenth-century era of development in the primarily former Haudenosaunee areas in Central New York. Each novel features Natty Bumppo, a frontiersman known to European-American settlers as "Leatherstocking", "The Pathfinder", and "the trapper". Native Americans call him "Deerslayer", "La Longue Carabine" ("Long Rifle" in French), and "Hawkeye".

== Publication history ==
Publication history
Publication date	Story dates	Title	Subtitle
1823	1793	The Pioneers	The Sources of the Susquehanna; A Descriptive Tale
1826	1757	The Last of the Mohicans	A Narrative of 1757
1827	1804	The Prairie	A Tale
1840	1758–1759	The Pathfinder	The Inland Sea
1841	1740–1755	The Deerslayer	The First War Path

The story dates are derived from dates given in the tales and span the period roughly of 1740–1806. They do not necessarily correspond with the actual dates of the historical events described in the series, which are discrepancies Cooper likely introduced for the sake of convenience. For instance, Cooper manipulated time to avoid making Leatherstocking 100 years old when he traveled to the Kansas plains in The Prairie.

The Natty Bumppo character is generally believed to be inspired, at least in part, by the historic explorer Daniel Boone or the lesser known David Shipman. Critic Georg Lukacs likened Bumppo to Sir Walter Scott's "middling characters; because they do not represent the extremes of society, these figures can serve as tools for the social and cultural exploration of historical events, without directly portraying the history itself.

=== Related novels ===
1. Homeward Bound; or The Chase: A Tale of the Sea (1838) - The Effingham family, descendants of Oliver Effingham of The Pioneers, return home from Europe. Set in the Atlantic Ocean and the North African coast in 1835.
2. Home as Found (1838) - Eve Effingham and her family encounter a social world new to them in New York City and Templeton (Cooperstown), New York in 1835.

== Characters ==
- Natty Bumppo is the protagonist of the series: an Anglo-American raised in part by Native Americans, and later a near-fearless warrior (his chief weapon is the long rifle). He and his Mohican "brother" Chingachgook are constant companions. He is known as "Deerslayer" in The Deerslayer, "Hawkeye" and "La Longue Carabine" in The Last of the Mohicans, "Pathfinder" in The Pathfinder, "Leatherstocking" in The Pioneers, and "the trapper" in The Prairie. The novels recount significant events in Natty Bumppo's life from 1740 to 1806.
- Chingachgook is a Mohican chief and companion of Bumppo. He is present in all the books except for The Prairie because he dies of old age after narrowly escaping a forest fire in The Pioneers.
- Uncas, son of Chingachgook, "last of the Mohicans", grew to manhood, yet he was killed in a battle with the hostile scout Magua. In actual history, a man named Uncas was a chief of the Mohegan in the 1600s. Though a prominent figure only in The Last of the Mohicans, he is mentioned as a boy at the very end of The Deerslayer, only once by name in The Pathfinder, and several times in The Prairie.

== Adaptations ==
Several films have been adapted from one or more of this series of Cooper's novels. Some used one of Bumppo's nicknames, most often Hawkeye, to identify this character, e.g., in:

- Lederstrumpf / Leatherstocking (1920 German silent film) co-starred Bela Lugosi as Chingachgook
- The serial film Leatherstocking (1924)
- The Last of the Mohicans (1936), the 1992 film is based on the screenplay of this film
- Chingachgook, die große Schlange (1967), an East German film, co-starred Gojko Mitić as Chingachgook
- Die Lederstrumpferzählungen (1969), West German ZDF miniseries, Hellmut Lange as Leatherstocking, Pierre Massimi as Chingachgook
- The Last of the Mohicans (1992), in which Hawkeye's surname was changed from Bumppo to Poe
- The Pathfinder (1952), Columbia Pictures film starring George Montgomery
- The Pathfinder (1996), where he is known chiefly as Pathfinder, but his birth name of Nathaniel is also mentioned

Two Canadian TV series were based on the character of Leatherstocking:

- In Hawkeye and the Last of the Mohicans (1957), Natty Bumppo's name was changed to Nat Cutler, but he was usually referred to as Hawkeye
- The series Hawkeye (1994) is mostly set around the fictional Fort Bennington during the French and Indian War

WQED (TV) Pittsburgh's Once Upon A Classic children's television series produced a four-episode adaptation entitled Leatherstocking Tales (1979), which won one Daytime Emmy Award for Outstanding Children's Series and was nominated for another for writing. The main character's name is Natty Bumppo, though other nicknames appear.

== In popular culture ==
- Bumppo is featured in the comic book series Jack of Fables (2006–2011), along with Slue-Foot Sue, as trackers hired to capture other "Fables".
- In Alan Moore's comic series The League of Extraordinary Gentlemen (1999–2007), Natty Bumppo is featured as a member of the group assembled by Lemuel Gulliver, alongside other literary characters including Dr Syn, Fanny Hill, The Scarlet Pimpernel, and Orlando.
- In J.R. Moehringer, The Tender Bar: A Memoir (2005), among the men Moehringer gets to know is Bud, who refers to Bumppo in the following quote: "Don't think of fear as the villain. Think of fear as your guide, your pathfinder – your Natty Bumppo." (p. 133)
- In the M*A*S*H franchise, the central character Benjamin Franklin "Hawkeye" Pierce was nicknamed this by his father, citing The Last of the Mohicans as "the only book my father ever read".

== Original works ==
- Cooper, James Fenimore (2015). The Complete Leatherstocking Tales, Vol. I. Ex Fontibus Company. ISBN 978-1-5147-2175-9.
- Cooper, James Fenimore (2015). The Complete Leatherstocking Tales, Vol. II. Ex Fontibus Company. ISBN 978-1-5147-2180-3.
- Cooper, James Fenimore (1954). Nevins, Allan (ed.). The Leatherstocking Saga. Pantheon Books.
