= The Last of the Mohicans =

1826 historical novel by James Fenimore Cooper

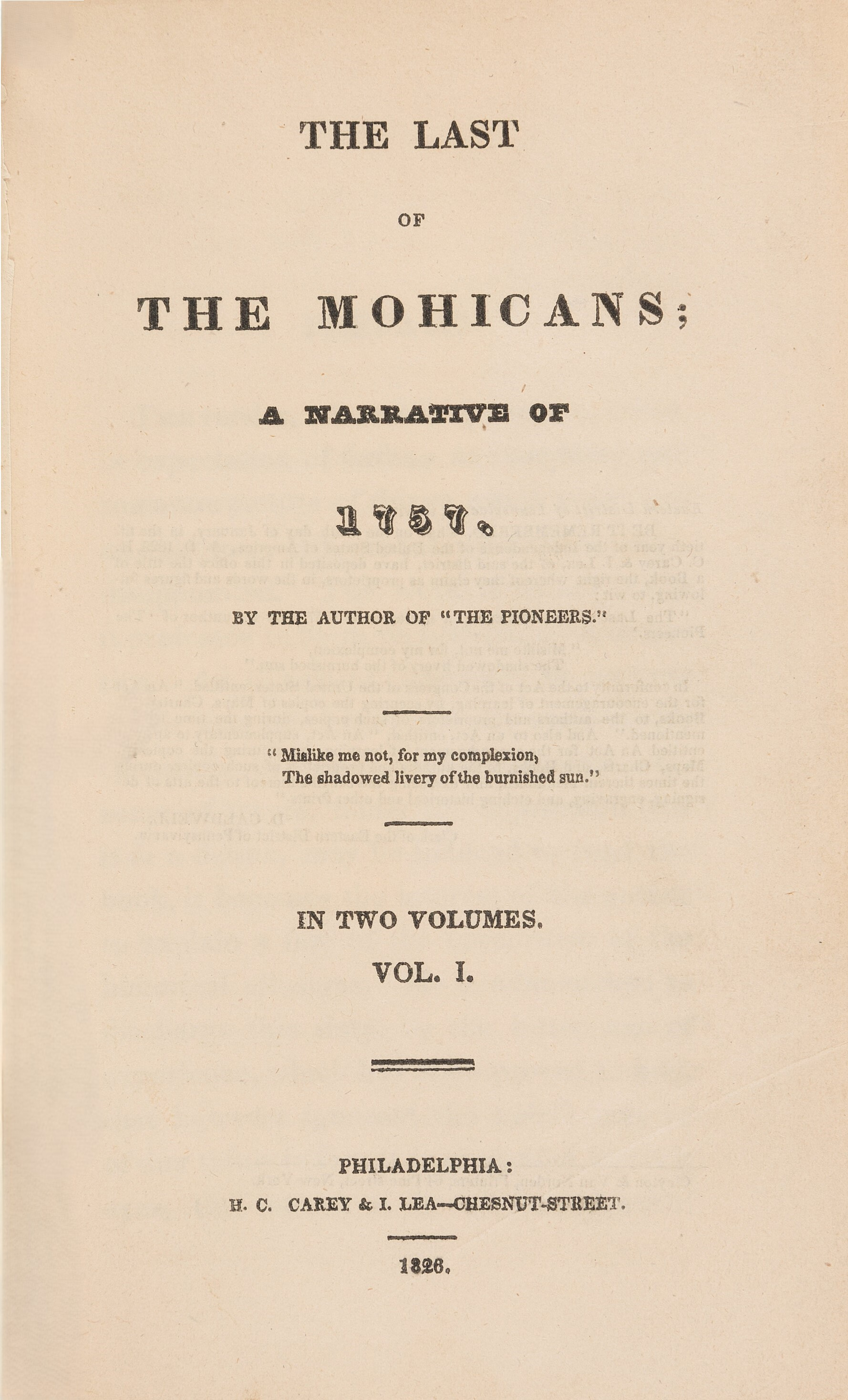
- First edition title page
- Author: James Fenimore Cooper
- Language: English
- Series: Leatherstocking Tales
- Genre: Historical novel
- Publisher: H.C. Carey & I. Lea
- Publication date: 4 February 1826
- Publication place: United States
- Dewey Decimal: 813.2
- Preceded by: The Pioneers (1823)
- Followed by: The Prairie (1827)

The Last of the Mohicans: A Narrative of 1757 is an 1826 historical romance novel by James Fenimore Cooper. It is the second book of the Leatherstocking Tales pentalogy and the best known to contemporary audiences. The Pathfinder, published 14 years later in 1840, is its sequel; its prequel, The Deerslayer, was published a year after The Pathfinder. The Last of the Mohicans is set in 1757, during the French and Indian War (the North American theater of the Seven Years' War), when France and Great Britain battled for control of North America. During this war, both the French and the British used Native American allies, but the French were particularly dependent on Indigenous forces since they were outnumbered in the Northeast frontier areas by the British. Specifically, the events of the novel are set immediately before, during, and after the Siege of Fort William Henry.

The novel is set primarily in the area of Lake George, New York, detailing the transport of Colonel Munro's two daughters, Alice and Cora, to a safe destination at Fort William Henry. Among the caravan guarding the women are the frontiersman Natty Bumppo, Major Duncan Heyward, singing teacher David Gamut, and the Mohicans Chingachgook and Uncas, the latter two being the novel's title characters. These characters are sometimes seen as a microcosm of the budding American society, particularly with regard to their racial composition.

The novel has been one of the most popular English-language novels since its publication; it is frequently assigned reading in American literature courses. It has been adapted numerous times and in many languages for the stage, films, and cartoons.

== Historical background ==
Cooper grew up in Cooperstown, New York, which his father had established on what was then a western frontier settlement that had developed after the Revolutionary War.

Cooper set this novel during the Seven Years' War, an international conflict between Great Britain and France, which had a front in North America known as the French and Indian War. The conflict arrayed American settlers and minimal regular forces against royal French forces, with both sides also relying on Native American allies. The war was fought primarily along the frontiers of the British colonies from Virginia to Nova Scotia.

In the spring of 1757, Lieutenant Colonel George Monro became garrison commander of Fort William Henry, located on Lake George in the Province of New York. In early August, Major General Louis-Joseph de Montcalm and 7,000 troops besieged the fort. On 2 August General Webb, who commanded the area from his base at Fort Edward south of the lake, sent 200 regulars and 800 Massachusetts militia to reinforce the garrison at William Henry. In the novel, this is the relief column with which Monro's daughters travel.

Monro sent messengers south to Fort Edward on 3 August requesting reinforcements, but Webb allegedly refused to send any of his estimated 1,600 men north because they were all that stood between the French and Albany. He wrote to Munro on 4 August that he should negotiate the best terms possible; this communication was intercepted and delivered to Montcalm. In Cooper's version, the missive was being carried by Bumppo when he, and it, fell into French hands.

On 7 August, Montcalm sent men to the fort under a truce flag to deliver Webb's dispatch. By then the fort's walls had been breached, many of its guns were useless, and the garrison had taken significant casualties. After another day of bombardment by the French, Monro raised the white flag and agreed to withdraw under parole.

When the withdrawal began, some of Montcalm's Indian allies, angered at the lost opportunity for loot, attacked the British column. Cooper's account of the attack and aftermath is lurid and takes some creative license because this is a work of fiction.

== Plot summary ==
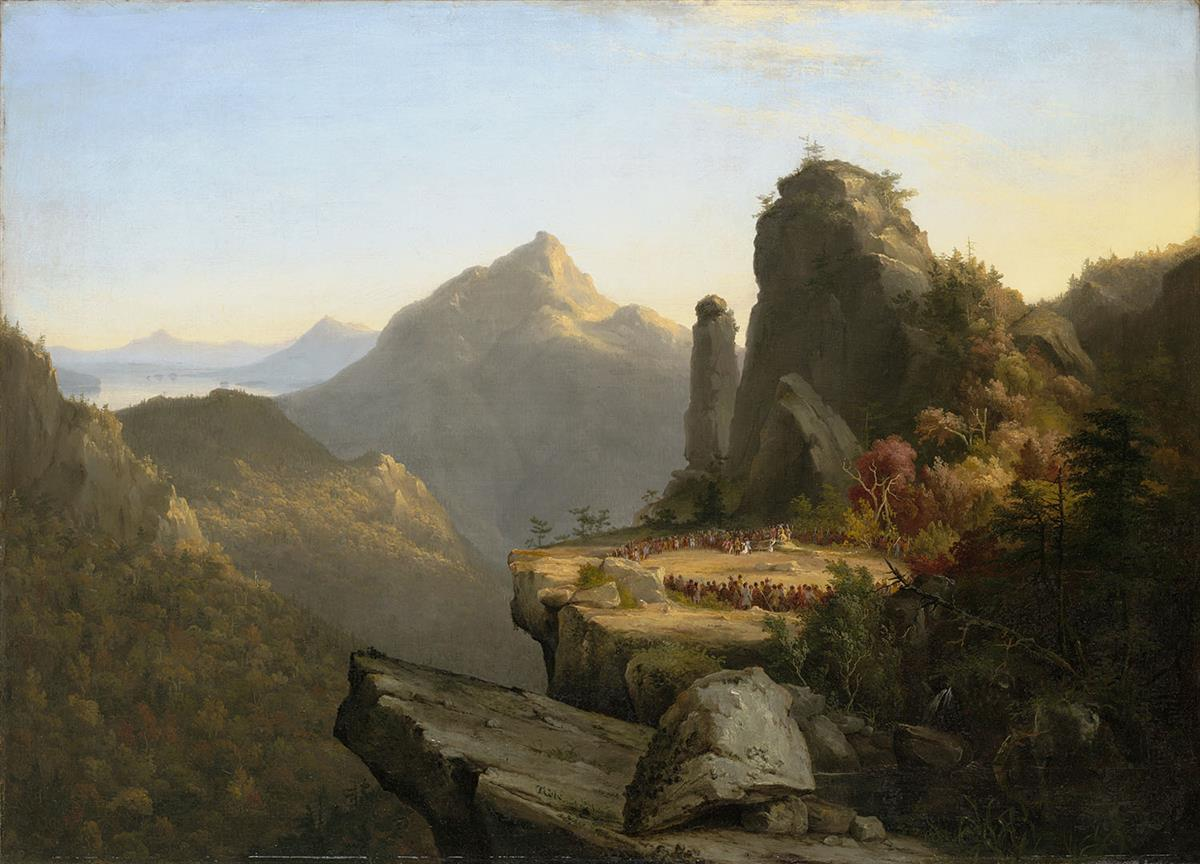
Thomas Cole, Cora Kneeling at the Feet of Tamenund, 1827

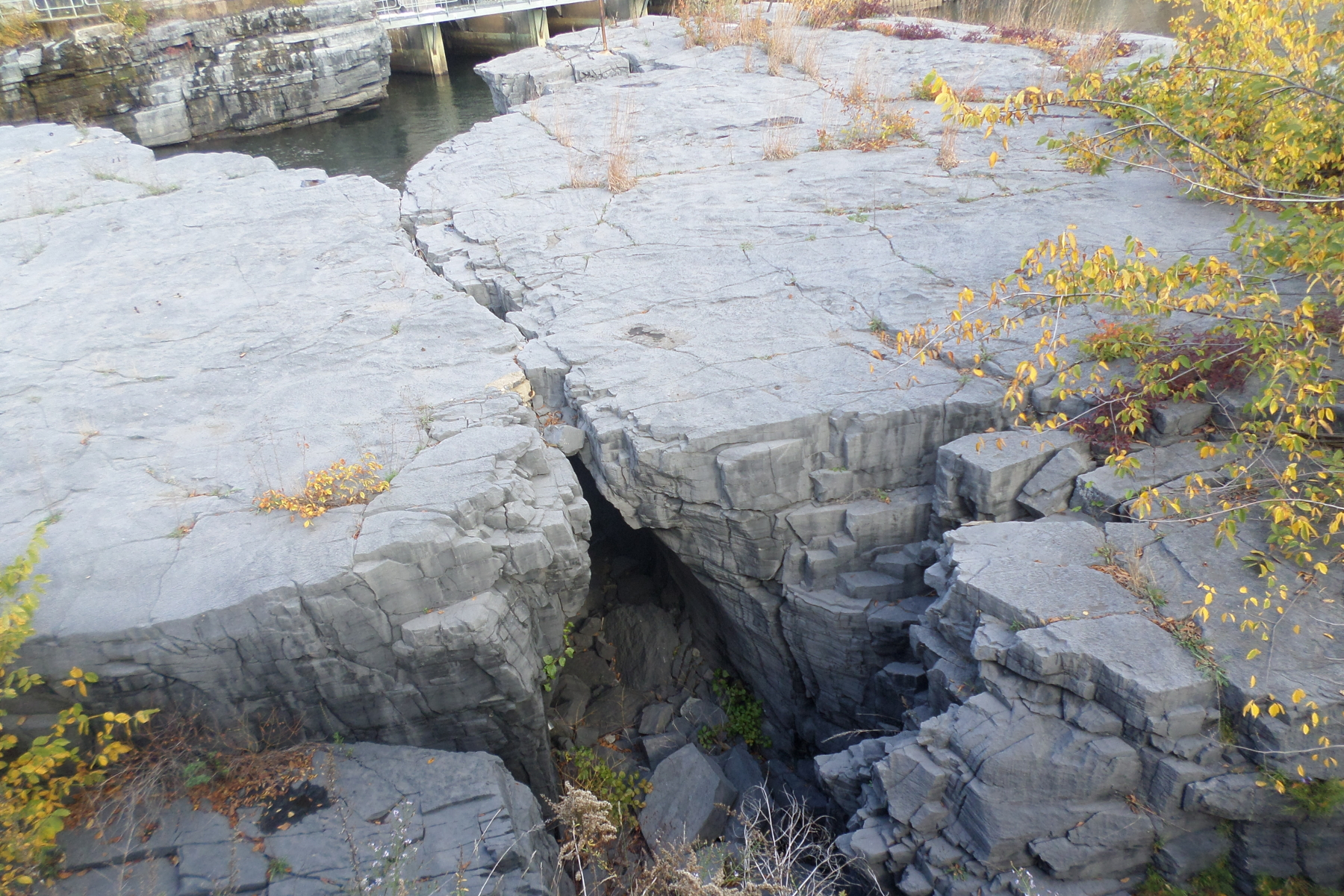
"Hawkeye's Cave" in 2016

In 1757, Cora and Alice Munro, daughters of Lieutenant Colonel Munro, are traveling with Major Duncan Heyward from Fort Edward to Fort William Henry, where Munro is in command, and acquire another companion in David Gamut, a singing teacher. They are guided through the forest by Magua, a native who leads them through a shortcut unaccompanied by the New York militia. Heyward is dissatisfied with Magua's shortcut, and the party roams unguided and finally join Natty Bumppo, known as Hawk-eye, a scout for the British, and his two Mohican friends, Chingachgook and his son Uncas. Heyward becomes suspicious of Magua, and Hawk-eye and the Mohicans agree with his suspicion that Magua is a Huron scout secretly allied with the French. Upon being exposed, Magua escapes, and believing (correctly) that Magua will return with Huron reinforcements, Hawk-eye and the Mohicans lead their new companions to a hidden cave on an island in a river. They are attacked there by the Hurons, Gamut is wounded by a stray shot and their ammunition is soon exhausted. Knowing they will be killed instantly but that the British party will make valuable captives, Hawk-eye and the Mohicans escape, with a promise to return for their companions.

Magua and the Hurons capture Heyward, Gamut, and the Munro sisters. Magua admits that he is seeking revenge against Cora's father, Colonel Munro, for turning him into an alcoholic with whiskey (causing him to be temporarily cast out of the Hurons) and then whipping him at a post for drunken behavior. He offers to spare the party if Cora becomes his wife, but she refuses. Upon a second refusal, he sentences the prisoners to death. Hawk-eye and the Mohicans rescue all four and lead them to a dilapidated building that was involved in a battle between the Huron and the British years before. They are nearly attacked again, but the Hurons leave the area, rather than disturb the graves of their tribesmen.

The next day, Hawk-eye leads the party to Fort William Henry, past a siege by the French army. Munro sends Hawk-eye to Fort Edward for reinforcements, but he is captured by the French, who deliver him to Fort William Henry without the letter. Heyward returns to Colonel Munro and announces his love for Alice, and Munro gives his permission for Heyward's courtship. The French general, Montcalm, invites Munro to a parley and shows him General Webb's letter, in which the British general has refused to send reinforcements. At this, Munro agrees to Montcalm's terms: that the British soldiers, together with their women and children, must leave the fort and withdraw from the war for eighteen months. Outside the fort, the column of British evacuees is betrayed and ambushed by 2,000 Huron warriors; in the ensuing massacre, Magua kidnaps Cora and Alice, and leads them toward the Huron village, with David Gamut in pursuit.

Hawk-eye, the Mohicans, Heyward, and Colonel Munro survive the massacre and cross a lake to intercept Magua's trail. They encounter a band of Hurons by the lakeshore, who spot the travelers. A canoe chase ensues, in which the rescuers reach land before the Hurons can kill them, and eventually follow Magua to the Huron village. Here, they find Gamut (earlier spared by the Hurons as a harmless madman), who says that Alice is held in this village and Cora in one belonging to the Lenape (Delaware).

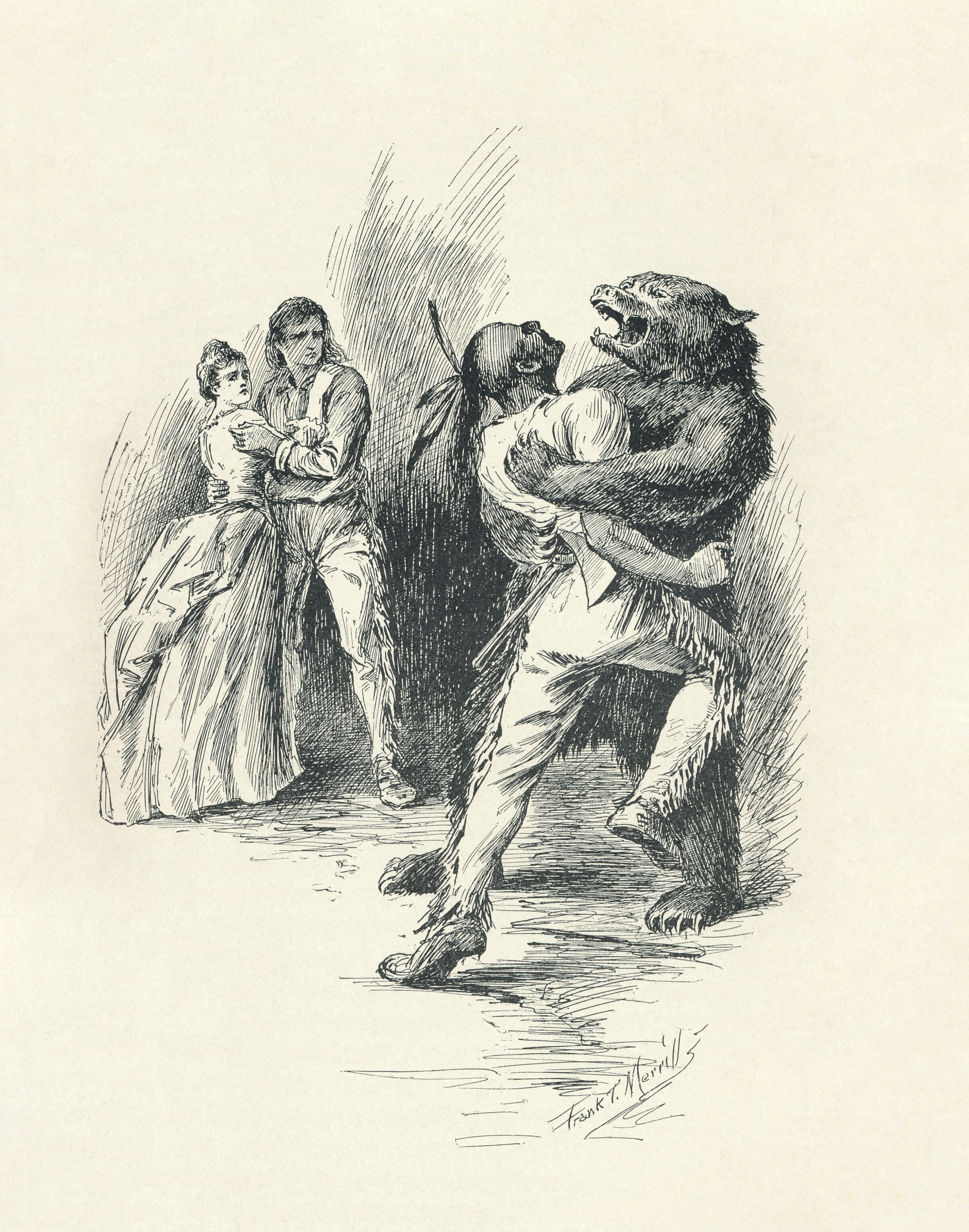
Illustration from the novel's 1896 edition depicting Hawk-eye disguised as a bear fighting Magua in the cave where Alice is held captive

Disguised as a French medicine man, Heyward enters the Huron village with Gamut to rescue Alice; Hawk-eye and Uncas set out to rescue Cora, and Munro and Chingachgook remain in safety. Uncas is taken prisoner by the Hurons and left to starve when he withstands torture, and Heyward fails to find Alice. A Huron warrior asks Heyward to heal his lunatic wife, and both are stalked by Hawk-eye in the guise of a bear. They enter a cave where the madwoman is kept, and the warrior leaves. Soon after the revelation of his identity to Heyward, Hawk-eye accompanies him, and they find Alice. They are discovered by Magua, but Hawk-eye overpowers him, and they leave him tied to a wall. Thereafter Heyward escapes with Alice, while Hawk-eye remains to save Uncas. Gamut convinces a Huron to allow him and his magical bear (Hawk-eye in disguise) to approach Uncas, and they untie him. Uncas dons the bear disguise, Hawk-eye wears Gamut's clothes, and Gamut stays in a corner mimicking Uncas. Uncas and Hawk-eye escape by traveling to the Delaware village where Cora is being held, just as the Hurons suspect something is amiss and find Magua tied up in the cave. Magua tells his tribe the full story behind Heyward and Hawk-eye's deceit before assuming leadership of the Hurons, who vow revenge.

Uncas and Hawk-eye are being held prisoner with Alice, Cora, and Heyward by the Delawares. Magua enters the Delaware village and demands the return of his prisoners. During the ensuing council meeting, Uncas is revealed to be a Mohican, a once-dominant tribe related to the Delawares. Tamenund, the sage of the Delawares, sides with Uncas and frees the prisoners, except Cora, whom he awards to Magua according to tribal custom. This makes a showdown between the Hurons and Delawares inevitable, but to satisfy laws of hospitality, Tamenund gives Magua a three-hour head start before pursuit. While the Delawares are preparing for battle, David Gamut escapes the Huron village and tells his companions that Magua has positioned his men in the woods between the Huron and Delaware villages. Undeterred, Uncas, Hawk-eye, Heyward, Gamut, and the Delawares march into the woods to fight the Hurons.

In the ensuing battle, the Delawares are joined by Chingachgook and Munro, and ultimately vanquish the Hurons and capture their village, but Magua escapes with Cora and two other Hurons; Uncas, Hawk-eye, Heyward, and Gamut pursue them up to a high mountain. In a fight at the edge of a cliff, a Huron kills Cora, Gamut kills another Huron, Magua kills Uncas, and Hawk-eye kills Magua. The funerals of Uncas and Cora are later held at the Delaware village. Tamenund prophesies: "The pale-faces are masters of the earth, and the time of the red-men has not yet come again..."

== Characters ==
- Chingachgook (usually pronounced /tʃɪŋˈɡætʃ.ɡuːk/, chin-GATCH-gook): last chief of the Mohican tribe, escort to the Munro sisters. Father to Uncas, and after Uncas' death, the eponymous "Last of the Mohicans". His name was an Unami Delaware word meaning "Big Snake".
- Uncas: the son of Chingachgook and called by him "Last of the Mohicans", as there were no pure-blooded Mohican women for him to marry. He is also known as Le Cerf Agile, the Bounding Elk.
- Nathaniel Bumppo/Hawk-eye: Œil de Faucon; a frontiersman who becomes an escort to the Munro sisters. Known to the Indians and the French as la Longue carabine for his marksmanship and signature weapon.
- Magua (/ˈmæɡwɑː/, MAG-wah): the villain; a Huron chief driven from his tribe for drunkenness; known as le Renard subtil ("Sly Fox").
- Cora Munro: a dark-haired daughter of Colonel Munro; serious, intelligent, and calm in the face of danger. Her mother, whom Munro met and married in the West Indies, was a mulatto or mixed-race woman, described as "descended, remotely" from slaves. Scholars have sometimes termed Cora a quadroon, but Cooper may have imagined her with even less African ancestry. Diane Roberts described Cora as "the first tragic mulatta in American literature." Cora's mother died when she was young.
- Alice Munro: Cora's blonde half-sister; cheerful, playful, frail, and charming. She is the daughter of Alice Graham, Munro's second wife.
- Colonel Munro: a British army colonel in command of Fort William Henry, whom Magua calls the "Gray Head."
- Duncan Heyward: a British army major from Virginia who falls in love with Alice Munro.
- David Gamut: a psalmodist (teacher of psalm-singing), known as "the singing master".
- General Daniel Webb: Colonel Munro's commanding officer, who takes command at Fort Edward.
- General Marquis de Montcalm: the French commander-in-chief, called by the Huron and other Indian allies of the French as "The great white father of the Canadas."
- Tamenund: An ancient, wise, and revered Delaware (Lenape) sage, who has outlived three generations of warriors.

== Development ==
According to Susan Fenimore Cooper, the author's eldest daughter, Cooper first conceived the idea for the book while visiting the Adirondack Mountains in 1825 with a party of English gentlemen. The party passed through the Catskills, an area with which Cooper was already familiar, and about which he had written in his first novel featuring Natty Bumppo: The Pioneers. They passed on to Lake George and Glens falls.

Impressed with the caves behind the falls, one member of the party suggested that "here was the very scene for a romance." Susan Cooper says that Edward Smith-Stanley, 14th Earl of Derby, made this remark. Cooper promised Stanley "that a book should be written, in which these caves should have a place; the idea of a romance essentially Indian in character then first suggesting itself to his mind."

Seeking a resource for his research, Cooper found it in the writings of Moravian missionaries. Two he used were David Zeisberger (1721–1808) and John Heckewelder (1743–1823). Here he found good, relatively non-judgmental accounts of the Indians. It was also here he apparently first heard of the Native American Wassamapah, known as Job to the fur traders. Pennsylvania Germans pronounced his name "Tschoop," the inspiration for Chingachgook. His birthdate is unknown. Tschoop's written history began on April 16, 1742 when he was baptized by Moravian preacher C.H.Rauch at Shekomeko, Connecticut. Rauch took him with him when the Moravian First Sea Congregation came to Philadelphia that June. It was also here that Tschoop met Count von Zinzendorf. Many non-Moravian whites were not convinced that Tschoop was a real Christian and made life difficult for him in Connecticut. Finally, he joined a group of Moravian Indians living in Bethlehem where the current City Hall is located. Here they got along peacefully in the community. Unfortunately, the Indians had no immunity to diseases that the Europeans brought with them. In 1746 smallpox began to take its toll on the community. It was August 27, 1746 that Job/Tschoop was buried in row eight of God's acre cemetery. Here he was remembered by Moravians, and "much lamented by his people and the white Brethren."

Cooper began work on the novel immediately. He and his family stayed for the summer in a cottage belonging to a friend, situated on the Long Island shore of the Sound, opposite Blackwell's Island, not far from Hallett's Cove (the area is now part of Astoria). He wrote quickly and completed the novel in the space of three or four months. He suffered a serious illness thought to have been brought on by sunstroke and, at one point, he dictated the outline of the fight between Magua and Chingachgook (12th chapter), to his wife, who thought that he was delirious.

In the novel, Hawkeye refers to Lake George as the Horican. Cooper felt that Lake George was too plain, while the French name, Le Lac du St. Sacrement, was "too complicated". Horican he found on an old map of the area; it was a French transliteration of a native group who had once lived in the area.

Cooper grew up in Cooperstown, New York, the frontier town founded by his father. His daughter said that as a young man he had few opportunities to meet and talk with Native Americans: "occasionally some small party of the Oneidas, or other representatives of the Five Nations, had crossed his path in the valley of the Susquehanna River, or on the shores of Lake Ontario, where he served when a midshipman in the navy." He read what sources were available at the time—Heckewelder, Charlevoix, William Penn, Smith, Elliot, Colden, Lang, Lewis and Clark, and Mackenzie.

By using the name Uncas for one of his characters, he seemed to confuse the two regional tribes: the Mohegan of Connecticut, of which Uncas had been a well-known sachem, and the Mohican of upstate New York. The popularity of Cooper's book helped spread the confusion.

In the period when Cooper was writing, deputations from the Western tribes frequently traveled through the region along the Mohawk River, on their way to New York or Washington, D.C. He made a point of visiting these parties as they passed through Albany and New York. On several occasions, he followed them to Washington and spoke with military officers and interpreters who accompanied them.

== Critical reception ==
The novel was first published in 1826 by Carey & Lea, of Philadelphia. According to Susan Cooper, its success was "greater than that of any previous book from the same pen" and "in Europe, the book produced quite a startling effect."

Over time the book became regarded by some as the first Great American Novel. Cooper's novels were popular in their day, but contemporary and later 19th-century reviewers were often critical, or dismissive. In May 1826, the London Magazine called the novel "clearly by much the worst of Mr. Cooper's performances." Mark Twain notably derided the author in his essay "Fenimore Cooper's Literary Offenses", published in North American Review in 1895. Twain complained that Cooper lacked a variety of styles and was overly wordy. In the early 1940s, Twain scholar Bernard DeVoto found that there was more to the essay, and pieced together a second one from the extra writing, titled "Fenimore Cooper's Further Literary Offenses", in which Twain rewrites a section of The Last of the Mohicans, claiming that Cooper, "the generous spendthrift", had used 100 "extra and unnecessary words".

Rereading the book in his later years, Cooper noted some inconsistencies of plot and characterization, particularly the character of Munro. But he wrote that in general, "the book must needs have some interest for the reader since it could amuse even the writer, who had in a great measure forgotten the details of his work."

== Legacy ==
The Last of the Mohicans has been James Fenimore Cooper's most popular work. It has influenced popular opinion about American Indians and the frontier period of eastern American history. The romanticized images of the strong, fearless, and ever-resourceful frontiersman (i.e., Natty Bumppo), as well as the stoic, wise, and noble "red man" (i.e., Chingachgook), were notions derived from Cooper's characterizations more than from anywhere else. The phrase, "the last of the Mohicans", has come to represent the sole survivor of a noble race or type.

In the M*A*S*H book, film and television franchise, the character Hawkeye Pierce is given his nickname by his father, after Hawk-eye from The Last of the Mohicans. A main character in the original novel and subsequent film adaptation, Hawkeye, as portrayed by Alan Alda, is the central character in the long-running TV series.

== Adaptations ==
=== Films ===
A number of films have been based on the lengthy book, making various cuts, compressions and changes. The American adaptations include:

- 1909: Leather Stocking, directed by David Wark Griffith.
- 1911: The Last of the Mohicans, directed by Theodore Marston, starring James Cruze.
- 1920: The Last of the Mohicans, directed by Maurice Tourneur, starring Wallace Beery.
- 1920: Der Letzte der Mohikaner, German film with Béla Lugosi as Chingachgook, was the second part of the two-part Lederstrumpf film released in 1920.
- 1932: The Last of the Mohicans, Mascot Pictures movie serial, starring Harry Carey;
- 1936: The Last of the Mohicans, starring Randolph Scott and Bruce Cabot.
- 1947: Last of the Redmen, starring Jon Hall and Michael O'Shea.
- 1950: The Iroquois Trail, starring George Montgomery.
- 1965: Fall of the Mohicans, starring Jack Taylor, José Marco (José Joandó Roselló), Luis Induni and Daniel Martin.
- 1965: The Last Tomahawk, directed by Harald Reinl was a West German/Italian/Spanish co-production setting elements of the story in the era after the American Civil War.
- 1992: The Last of the Mohicans, starring Daniel Day-Lewis.

The 1920 film has been deemed "culturally significant" by the Library of Congress and selected for preservation in the United States National Film Registry. According to the director Michael Mann, his 1992 version was based more on the 1936 film version. Mann believes Cooper's novel is "not a very good book", taking issue with Cooper's sympathy for the Euro-Americans and their seizure of the American Indians' domain.

=== Television ===
- 1957: Hawkeye and the Last of the Mohicans. Canadian television series, with John Hart as Hawkeye and Lon Chaney Jr. as Chingachgook.
- 1969: The Leatherstocking Tales Part 2 - The Last of the Mohicans (Die Lederstrumpferzählungen Tail 2 - Der letzte Mohikaner). 4 parts Germany-France series
- 1971: The Last of the Mohicans. 8-part miniseries, made by the BBC, with Philip Madoc as Magua, Kenneth Ives as Hawkeye and John Abineri as Chingachgook, which some critics believe to be the best and most faithful adaptation.
- 1977: Last of the Mohicans. American TV-movie, Steve Forrest starred as Hawkeye with Ned Romero as Chingachgook and Don Shanks as Uncas.
- 1984: Once Upon A Classic: The Leatherstocking Tales, Part 3. PBS miniseries with Cliff DeYoung as Hawkeye and Roger Hill as Chingachgook.
- 1994: Hawkeye. American TV series, produced by Stephen J. Cannell, created by Kim LeMasters and filmed in Canada. It ran for one season, with 22 episodes, and starred Lee Horsley, Lynda Carter, and Rodney A. Grant.

=== Radio ===
- The Last of the Mohicans was adapted for radio as a 12-part serial in 1932 and directed by Charles Frederick Lindsay.
- The Last of the Mohicans was adapted for radio by David Calcutt in two one-hour episodes directed by Michael Fox and broadcast in 1995 on BBC Radio 4 on 05 November and 12 November (subsequently on BBC Radio 7), with Michael Fiest as Hawkeye, Alfredo Michelsen as Magua, Philip Franks as Major Heyward, Helen McCrory as Cora, and Naomi Radcliffe as Alice.
- The Last of the Mohicans was adapted again by BBC Radio 4 in 2025 as part of its Drama on 4 - Story of America series, a major collection of dramatisations of milestone American titles marking 250 years since the Declaration of Independence, in two one-hour episodes directed by Polly Thomas and dramatised by playwright Shahid Iqbal Khan, with Leonie Elliott as Cora Munro, Jay Rincon as Uncas and Bradley Lewis as Magua. Episode One aired on 28 December 2025 and Episode Two aired on 04 January 2026.

=== Opera ===
Alva Henderson's operatic version premiered in Wilmington, Delaware, in 1976.

In 1977, Lake George Opera presented the same work.

=== Comics ===
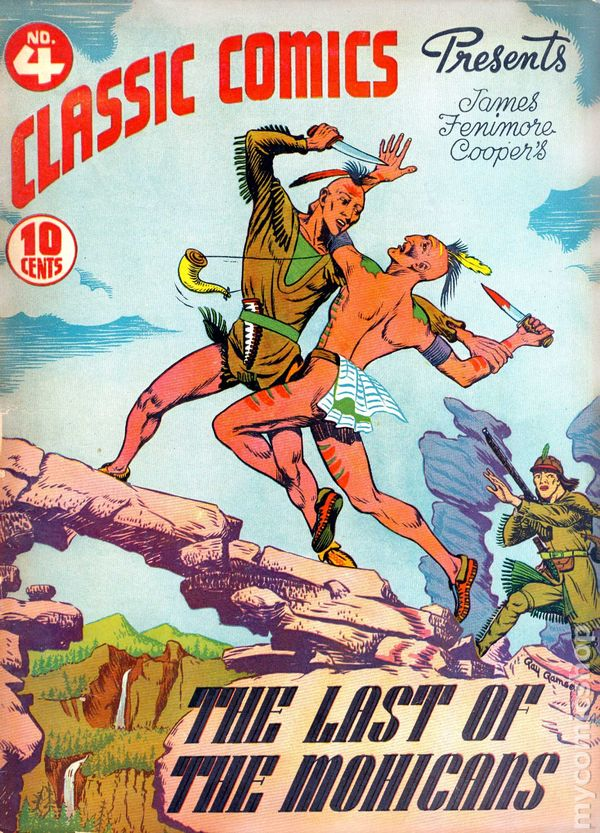
Classics Illustrated, The Last of the Mohicans Issue #4.

Classic Comics #4, The Last of the Mohicans, first published 1942.

Marvel Comics has published two versions of the story: in 1976 a one-issue version as part of their Marvel Classics Comics series (issue #13). In 2007, they published a six-issue mini-series to start the new Marvel Illustrated series.

Famed manga artist Shigeru Sugiura wrote and illustrated a very loose manga adaptation of the story in 1952–53 (remade in 1973–74). This adaptation is heavily influenced by American movies and western comics and is filled with absurd humor and anachronistic jokes. An English translation of Sugiura's 1973–4 version including a lengthy essay on Sugiura's artistic influences was published in the United States in 2013.

=== Books ===
Written adaptations of The Last of the Mohicans, ranging from sequels and spin-offs to retellings and modernized translations, include:

- 1995: Song of the Mohicans, by Paul Block – a direct sequel that picks up the narrative immediately after the funeral of Uncas.
- 1999: The Last of the Breed (The Adventures of Wishbone #16), by Alexander Steele – a children's adaptation in which Wishbone the dog imagines himself as Hawkeye.
- 1999: Into the Wilderness, by Sara Donati – a historical reimagining set 35 years later, featuring Hawkeye’s son.
- 2022: The Last of the Mohicans: The Grey Translation, by Aldwin Grey – a modern English translation of the original text.

== See also ==
- France in the Seven Years' War
- George Washington in the French and Indian War
- Great Britain in the Seven Years' War
