= The Last Tomahawk =

1965 film

- Film poster
- German: Der letzte Mohikaner
- Directed by: Harald Reinl
- Written by: J. Joachim Bartsch; Roberto Bianchi Montero; Giovanni Simonelli
- Based on: The Last of the Mohicans by James Fenimore Cooper
- Produced by: Alfons Carcasona; Heinz Willeg; Eduardo de la Fuente
- Starring: Joachim Fuchsberger; Karin Dor; Marie France
- Cinematography: Ernst W. Kalinke; Giuseppe la Torre
- Edited by: Hermann Haller
- Music by: Peter Thomas
- Production companies: International Germania Film; Cine-Produzioni Associate; Balcázar Producciones Cinematográficas
- Distributed by: Constantin Film
- Release date: 17 April 1965
- Running time: 92 minutes
- Countries: West Germany; Spain; Italy
- Language: German

The Last Tomahawk or The Last of the Mohicans (German: Der letzte Mohikaner) is a 1965 Western adventure film directed by Harald Reinl and starring Joachim Fuchsberger, Karin Dor and Marie France. It was a co-production between France, Spain and West Germany. It is loosely based on James Fenimore Cooper's 1826 novel The Last of the Mohicans, with the setting moved forward more than a century to the American West of the post-Civil War-era. Another version Fall of the Mohicans was made the same year.

It was shot at the Spandau Studios in Berlin and on location in Andalucia. The film's sets were designed by the art director Hans Jürgen Kiebach.

== Cast ==
- Joachim Fuchsberger as Captain Bill Hayward
- Karin Dor as Cora Munroe
- Marie France as Alice Munroe
- Carl Lange as Colonel Munroe
- Ricardo Rodríguez as Magua
- Kurt Großkurth as Koch
- Daniel Martín as Unkas
- Anthony Steffen as Falkenauge
- Mariano Alcón as Tamenund
- Frank Braña as Corporal
- Mike Brendel as Chingachgook
- Stelio Candelli as Roger
- Carlos Deschamps as Jackson
- Rafael Hernández as Roger's Henchman
- Jean-Claude Mathieu as Matt
- Ángel Ter as Jeff
