= David Shipman =

David Shipman may refer to:

- David Shipman (colonist) (1730–1813), real-life inspiration for James Fenimore Cooper's character Natty Bumppo in the Leatherstocking Tales
- David Shipman (writer) (1932–1996), British film critic and writer
