= Arthur Wellin =

German film director

- Born: 31 October 1880; Berlin, Germany
- Died: Unknown
- Occupations: Film director, actor, screenwriter, film producer
- Years active: 1915-1933

Arthur Wellin (born 31 October 1880, date of death unknown) was a German film director, actor, screenwriter and producer. He directed 18 films between 1916 and 1927. He also appeared in 11 films between 1915 and 1933. He was born in Berlin, Germany.

== Selected filmography ==
- The Vice (1915)
- The Picture of Dorian Gray (1917)
- The Rose of Stamboul (1919)
- The Last of the Mohicans (1920)
- The Deerslayer and Chingachgook (1920)
- Don Juan (1922)
- Miss Rockefeller Is Filming (1922)
- Orient (1924)
- Lützow's Wild Hunt (1927)
- Light-Hearted Isabel (1927)
- The Convict from Istanbul (1929)
