= The Vice (film) =

1915 film directed by Richard Oswald

- Directed by: Richard Oswald
- Written by: Richard Oswald
- Produced by: Jules Greenbaum
- Starring: Alfred Abel; Rosa Valetti; Arthur Wellin
- Cinematography: Carl Hoffmann
- Production company: Greenbaum-Film
- Release date: 12 March 1915
- Country: Germany
- Languages: Silent; German intertitles

The Vice (German: Das Laster) is a 1915 German silent drama film directed by Richard Oswald and starring Alfred Abel, Rosa Valetti and Arthur Wellin.

It was shot at the Weissensee Studios in Berlin.

== Cast ==
- Alfred Abel as Paul
- Rosa Valetti as Mutter
- Arthur Wellin
- Marianne Wulff
- Rezia Markoff

== Bibliography ==
- Bock, Hans-Michael & Bergfelder, Tim. The Concise CineGraph. Encyclopedia of German Cinema. Berghahn Books, 2009.
