= The Deerslayer =

1841 Book by James Fenimore Cooper

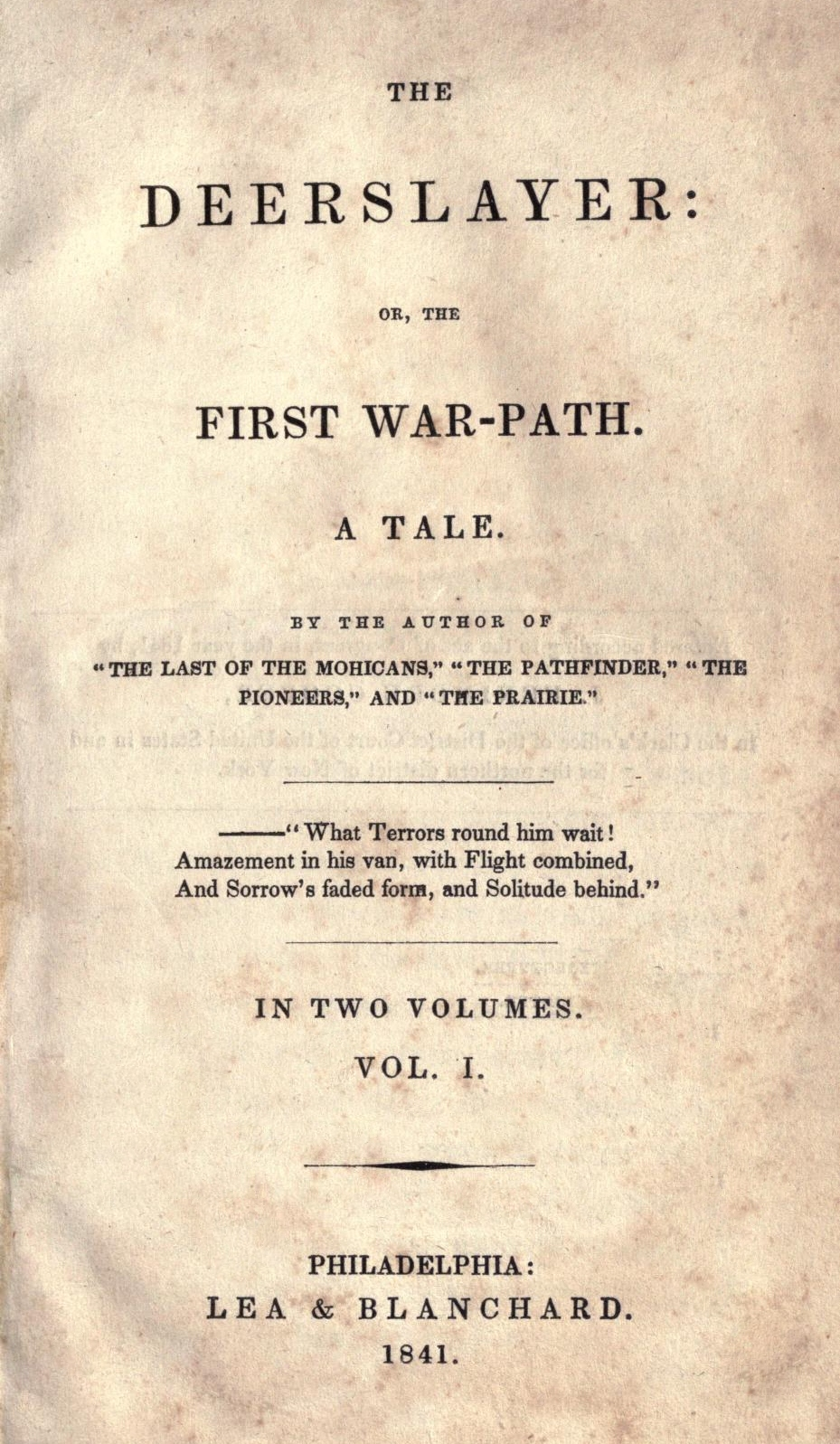
- First edition title page
- Author: James Fenimore Cooper
- Language: English
- Series: Leatherstocking Tales
- Genre: Adventure novel, Historical novel
- Published: 1841 (Lea & Blanchard: Philadelphia)
- Publication place: United States
- Media type: Print (Hardback & Paperback)
- Pages: 560 pp in two volumes
- Followed by: The Last of the Mohicans

The Deerslayer, or The First War-Path was James Fenimore Cooper's fifth and last novel published in 1841 in his Leatherstocking Tales. Its 1740–1745 time period makes it the first installment chronologically and in the lifetime of the hero of the Leatherstocking tales, Natty Bumppo. The novel's setting on Otsego Lake in central, upstate New York, is the same as that of The Pioneers, the first of the Leatherstocking Tales to be published (1823). The Deerslayer is considered to be the prequel to the rest of the series. Fenimore Cooper begins his work by relating the astonishing advance of civilization in New York State, which is the setting of four of his five Leatherstocking Tales.

== Plot ==
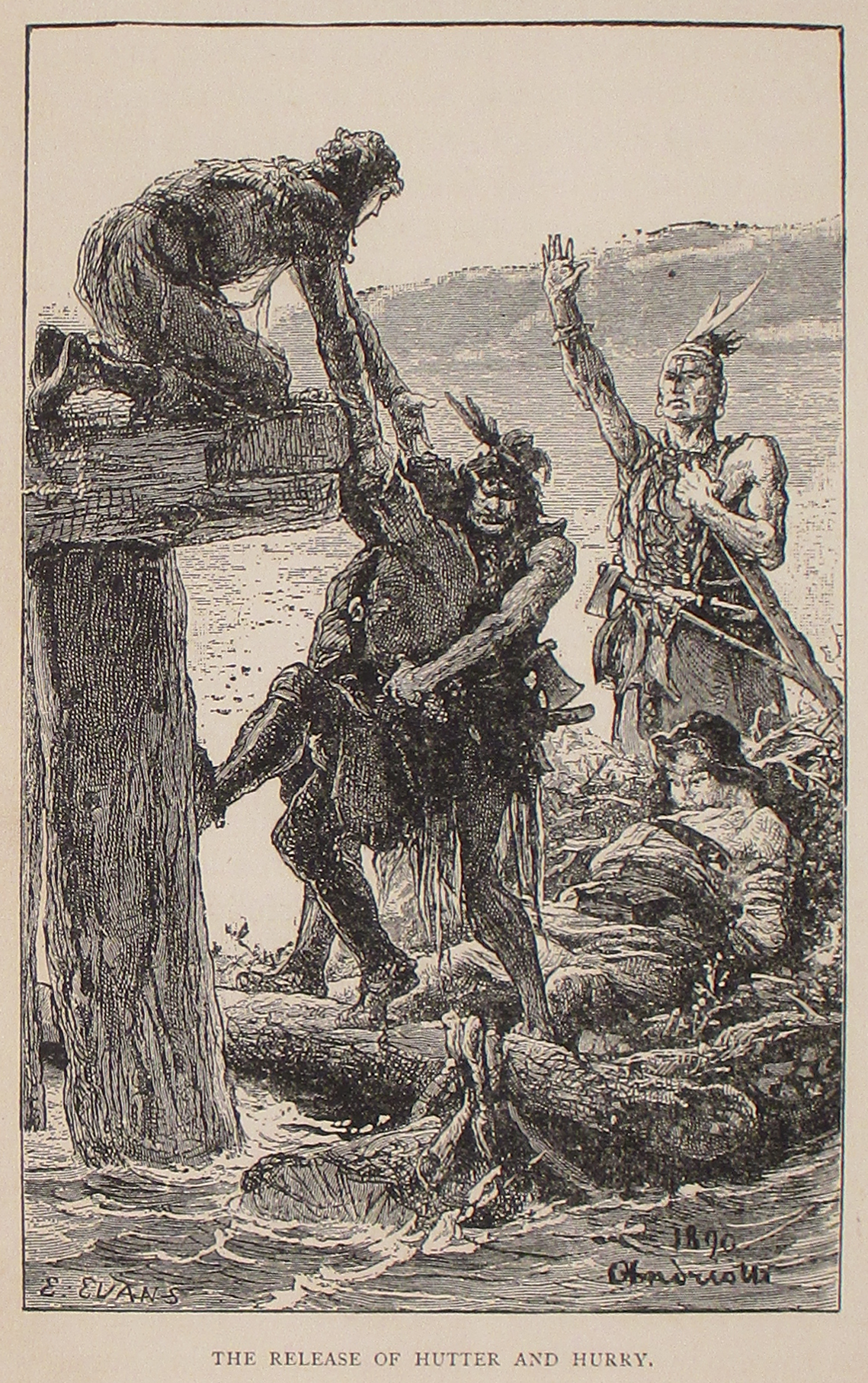
The release of Hutter and Hurry

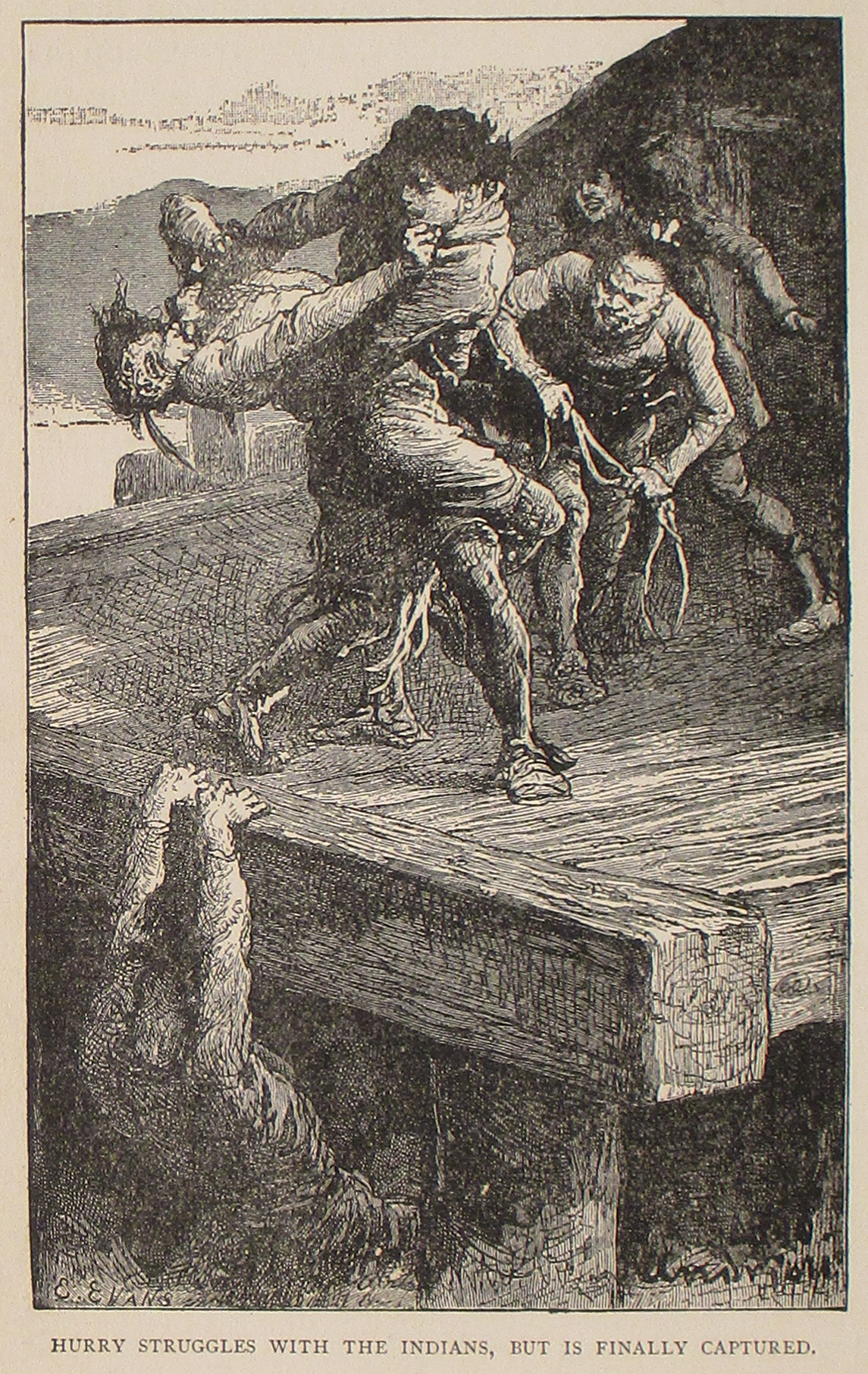
Hurry struggles with the Native Americans, but is finally captured

This novel introduces Natty Bumppo as "Deerslayer," a young frontiersman in early 18th-century New York, who objects to the practice of taking scalps, on the grounds that every living thing should follow "the gifts" of its nature, which would keep European Americans from taking scalps. Two characters who actually seek to take scalps are Deerslayer's foil Henry March (alias "Hurry Harry") and the former pirate 'Floating Tom' Hutter, to whom Deerslayer is introduced en route to a rendezvous with the latter's lifelong friend Chingachgook (who first appeared as "Indian John" in The Pioneers).

Shortly before the rendezvous, Hutter's residence is besieged by the Hurons, and Hutter and March sneak into the camp of the besiegers to kill and scalp as many as they can, but they are captured in the act, and later ransomed by Bumppo, Chingachgook, and Hutter's daughters Judith and Hetty. Bumppo and Chingachgook thereafter plan to rescue Chingachgook's kidnapped betrothed Wah-ta-Wah (alias 'Hist') from the Hurons, but while rescuing her, Bumppo is captured. In his absence, the Hurons attack Hutter's home, and Hutter is scalped alive. On his deathbed, he confesses that Judith and Hetty were not his daughters by birth, and Judith determines to discover her natural father's identity, but her search reveals only that her late mother had been of aristocratic descent, and had married 'Floating Tom' after the collapse of an illicit affair.

Later, Judith attempts and fails to rescue Deerslayer from the Hurons. They are all saved at last when March returns with British troops, who ambush the Hurons and kill most of them; Hetty is mortally wounded in the confusion. After Hetty's death, Judith proposes marriage to Deerslayer, but is refused, and is last described as the paramour of a soldier. Fifteen years later, Bumppo and Chingachgook return to the site to find Hutter's house in ruins.

== Criticism ==
The brunt of Mark Twain's satire and criticism of Cooper's writing, "Fenimore Cooper's Literary Offenses" (1895), fell on The Deerslayer and The Pathfinder. Twain wrote at the beginning of the essay: "In one place in Deerslayer, and in the restricted space of two-thirds of a page, Cooper has scored 114 offenses against literary art out of a possible 115. It breaks the record." He then lists 18 out of 19 rules "governing literary art in domain of romantic fiction" that Cooper violates in The Deerslayer.

Proponents of Cooper have criticized Twain's essay as unfair and distorted. Cooper scholars Lance Schachterle and Kent Ljungquist write, "Twain's deliberate misreading of Cooper has been devastating....Twain valued economy of style (a possible but not necessary criterion), but such concision simply was not a characteristic of many early nineteenth-century novelists' work." Similarly, John McWilliams comments:

Hilarious though Twain's essay is, it is valid only within its own narrow and sometimes misapplied criteria. Whether Twain is attacking Cooper's diction or Hawkeye's tracking feats, his strategy is to charge Cooper with one small inaccuracy, reconstruct the surrounding narrative or sentence around it, and then produce the whole as evidence that Cooper's kind of English would prevent anyone from seeing reality.

In Carl Van Doren's view, the book is essentially a romance, at the same time considerably realistic. The dialect is careful, the wordcraft generally sound. The movement is rapid, the incidents varied, and the piece as a whole absorbing. The reality of the piece comes chiefly from the reasoned presentation of the central issue: the conflict in Leather-Stocking between the forces which draw him to the woods and those which seek to attach him to his human kind. Van Doren calls Judith Hutter one of the few convincing young women in Cooper's works; of the minor characters only the ardent young Chingachgook and the silly Hetty Hutter call for his notice.

D. H. Lawrence called The Deerslayer "one of the most beautiful and perfect books in the world: flawless as a jewel and of gem-like concentration."

== Adaptations ==
=== Film ===
- 1913: The Deerslayer, starring Harry T. Morey and Wallace Reid. Filmed at Otsego Lake, the actual setting of the novel. Filmed in 1911, released two years later.
- 1920: The Deerslayer and Chingachgook, a German film with Béla Lugosi as Chingachgook. This was the first part of the two-part Lederstrumpf silent film.
- 1923: The Deerslayer (Lederstrumpf). Made in Germany (https://www.imdb.com/title/tt0014193/).
- 1943: Deerslayer, starring Bruce Kellogg and Jean Parker.
- 1957: The Deerslayer, starring Lex Barker and Rita Moreno.
- 1967: Chingachgook, die große Schlange, an East German Red Western from DEFA studios, starring Gojko Mitić.
- 1990: Зверобой, a Soviet version.

=== TV ===
- 1924: Leatherstocking (serial) - 10 series.
- 1969: The Leatherstocking Tales Part 1 - The Deerslayer (Die Lederstrumpferzählungen Tail 1 - Der Wildtöter). 4 parts Germany-France series (https://de.wikipedia.org/wiki/Die_Lederstrumpferz%C3%A4hlungen).
- 1978: The Deerslayer (https://www.imdb.com/title/tt0077417/). TV-film, was directed by Richard Friedenberg and starred Steve Forrest as Hawkeye.
- 1984: Once Upon A Classic: The Leatherstocking Tales Parts 1 and 2. A PBS miniseries with Cliff DeYoung as Natty Bumppo and Roger Hill as Chingachgook.

=== Radio ===
In 1932, The Deerslayer was adapted as a thirteen-part serial radio drama as part of the Leatherstocking Tales. It was directed and performed by Charles Fredrick Lindsay and contains both Deerslayer and Last of the Mohicans.

=== Comics ===
In January 1944 Classic Comics adapted the story for issue 17 of the series.

French comics artist Jean Ache adapted the story into a newspaper comic for Jeudi-Matin in 1949.
