= The Last of the Mohicans (1932 serial) =

1932 film

- Directed by: Ford Beebe; B. Reeves Eason
- Written by: Colbert Clark; Jack Natteford; Ford Beebe; Wyndham Gittens; James Fenimore Cooper (novel)
- Produced by: Nat Levine
- Starring: Harry Carey; Hobart Bosworth; Frank Coghlan Jr. Edwina Booth; Lucile Browne; Walter Miller
- Cinematography: Ernest Miller; Jack Young
- Edited by: Ray Snyder
- Music by: Lee Zahler
- Distributed by: Mascot Pictures
- Release date: May 17, 1932
- Running time: 12 chapters (231 minutes)
- Country: United States
- Language: English

The Last of the Mohicans is a 1932 American pre-Code Mascot movie serial based on the 1826 novel The Last of the Mohicans by James Fenimore Cooper.

== Cast ==
- Harry Carey as Natty Bumppo/Hawkeye
- Hobart Bosworth as Chingachgook, 'the Sagamore'
- Junior Coghlan as Uncas
- Edwina Booth as Cora Munro
- Lucile Browne as Alice Munro
- Walter Miller as Major Duncan Heyward
- Bob Kortman as Magua
- Walter McGrail as Dulac, the French spy
- Nelson McDowell as David Gamut; McDowell also played the part of David Gamut in the 1920 silent film of the same name
- Edward Hearn as Colonel Munro
- Mischa Auer as General Montcalm
- Yakima Canutt as Black Fox (and other supporting roles)

== Production ==
The Last of the Mohicans was adapted from the novel by James Fenimore Cooper.

== Chapter titles ==
1. Wild Waters
2. Flaming Arrows
3. Rifle or Tomahawk
4. Riding with Death
5. Red Shadows
6. Lure of Gold
7. Crimson Trail
8. Tide of Battle
9. Redskins' Honor
10. The Enemy's Stronghold
11. Paleface Magic
12. End of the Trail

_{Source:}

== See also ==
- List of film serials by year
- List of film serials by studio

Preceded by The Shadow of the Eagle (1932)	Mascot Serial; The Last of the Mohicans (1932)	Succeeded by The Hurricane Express (1932)
