= The Last of the Mohicans (1920 German film) =

1920 film

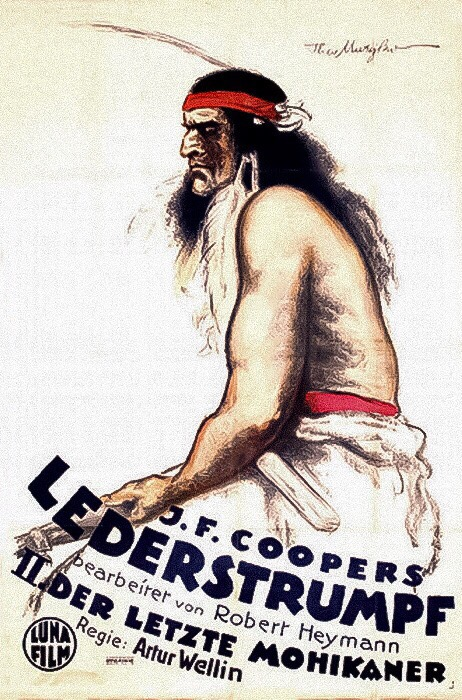
- Directed by: Arthur Wellin
- Written by: James Fenimore Cooper; Robert Heymann
- Produced by: Arthur Wellin
- Starring: Bela Lugosi
- Cinematography: Ernest Plhak
- Release date: 10 November 1920
- Country: Weimar Republic
- Languages: Silent; English intertitles

The Last of the Mohicans (German: Der letzte der Mohikaner) is the feature-length second part of the 1920 German silent Western film Lederstrumpf (Leatherstocking) directed by Arthur Wellin and featuring Bela Lugosi and Emil Mamalock. Bela Lugosi played the Indian Chingachgook, one of his most unusual roles, and Emil Mamalock played Hawkeye, the Deerslayer. It is based on James Fenimore Cooper's 1826 novel of the same name. The first part is The Deerslayer and Chingachgook (Der Wildtöter und Chingachgook).

A print of Lederstrumpf, in its heavily edited shortened U.S. version titled The Deerslayer, was discovered in the 1990s, but the original full-length German film is lost.

== Cast ==
In alphabetical order

- Charles Barley as Harry
- Edward Eyseneck as Worley
- Herta Heden as Judith Hutter
- Gottfried Kraus as Tom Hutter
- Bela Lugosi as Chingachgook, an Indian brave
- Emil Mamelok as the Deerslayer (aka Hawkeye)
- Erna Rehberger as Heddy Hutter
- Kurt Rottenburg as Magua (villain)
- Egon Söhnlein as Col. Munro
- Margot Sokolowska as Wah-ta-Wah
- Heddy Sven as Cora Munro

== See also ==
- Bela Lugosi filmography
