= The Pioneers (novel) =

1823 historical novel by James Fenimore Cooper

The Pioneers, or the Sources of the Susquehanna; a Descriptive Tale
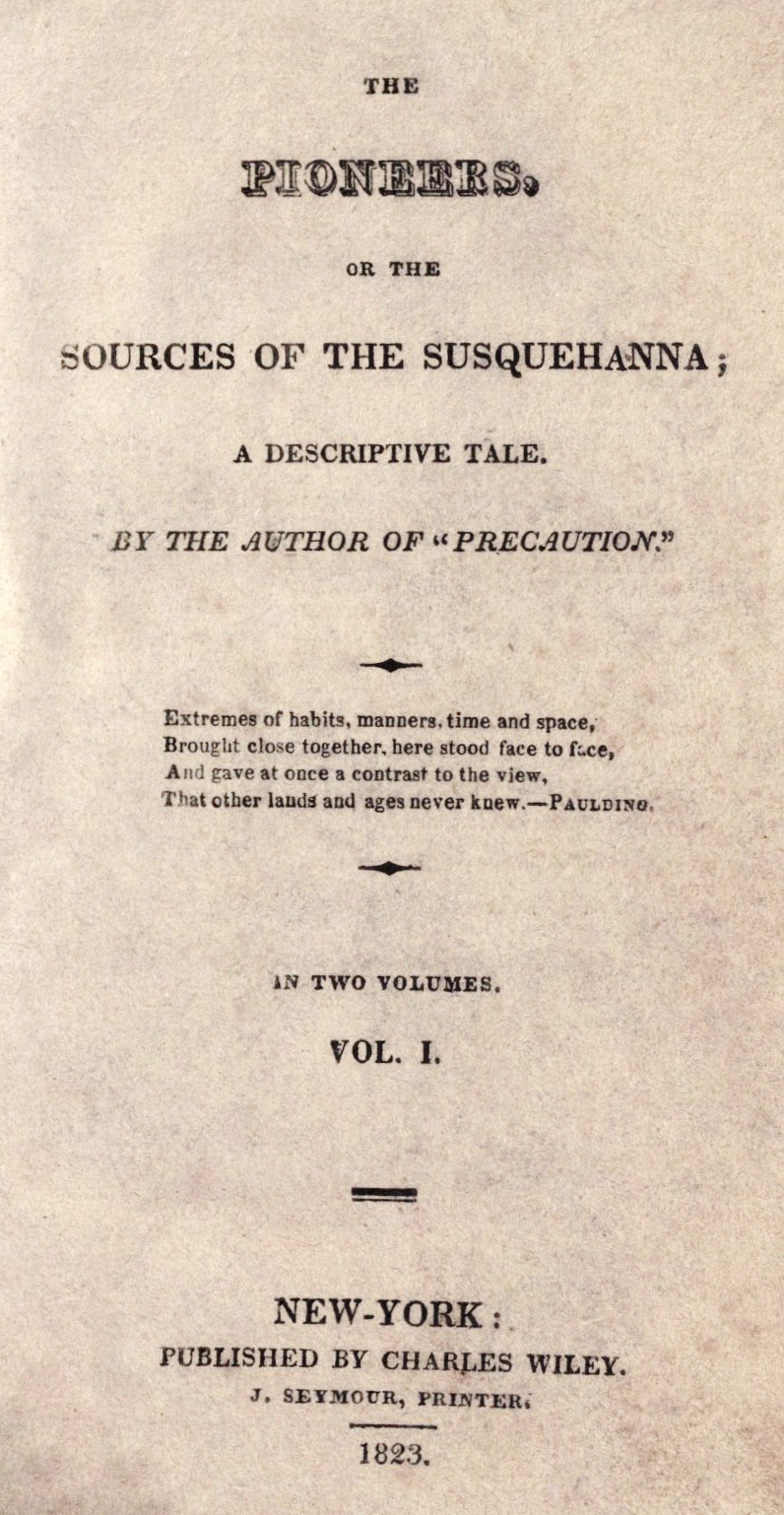
- First edition title page
- Author: James Fenimore Cooper
- Language: English
- Series: Leatherstocking
- Genre: Historical novel
- Publisher: Charles Wiley
- Publication date: 1823
- Publication place: United States
- Media type: Print (Hardback & Paperback)
- Pages: 2 vol.
- Preceded by: The Pathfinder, or The Inland Sea
- Followed by: The Prairie

The Pioneers, or The Sources of the Susquehanna; a Descriptive Tale is an 1823 historical novel by American writer James Fenimore Cooper. It was the first of five novels published which became known as the Leatherstocking Tales. The Pioneers is the fourth novel in terms of the chronology of the novels' plots.

== Plot summary ==
The story takes place on the rapidly advancing frontier of New York State and features an elderly Leatherstocking (Natty Bumppo), Judge Marmaduke Temple of Templeton (whose life parallels that of the author's father Judge William Cooper), and Elizabeth Temple (based on the author's sister, Hannah Cooper), daughter of the fictional Templeton. The story begins with an argument between the judge and Leatherstocking over who killed a buck.

Through their discussion, Cooper reviews many of the changes to New York's Lake Otsego and its area: questions of environmental stewardship, conservation, and use prevail. Leatherstocking and his closest friend, the Mohican Indian Chingachgook, begin to compete with the Temples for the loyalties of a mysterious young visitor, a "young hunter" known as Oliver Edwards. The latter eventually marries Elizabeth Temple. Chingachgook dies, representing European-American fears for the race of "dying Indians", who appear to be displaced by settlers. Natty vanishes into the sunset.

== Analysis ==
The Pioneers was the first novel of James Fenimore Cooper's Leatherstocking Tales series, featuring the character Natty Bumppo, a resourceful white American living in the woods. The story focuses on the development of a "wilderness" area (as classified by European Americans) as a settled European-American community with refinements. The story takes place in the fictional town of Тempleton, which is said to be modeled after Cooperstown, New York, founded by Cooper's father after the Revolutionary War.

Naturalist ideas: Although not classified as a naturalist novel, Cooper depicts many naturalist based ideas in The Pioneers. His use of language, dialogue and description help to convey this movement within this novel.

- Landscape: In The Pioneers, Cooper thematically debates the complexity of landscape within a new American frontier. The battle between nature and civilization is a constant and competing force within the minds of the characters and in the general surroundings. Cooper evaluates his landscape as one that will be established by a civilization unable to escape its own traits of wastefulness and arrogance.
- Characters: Cooper expands the conflict between nature and civilization in his characters. Specifically, Cooper writes much more detailed dialogue for “Natty Bumpo” than he does for any of the other characters. Natty stresses the importance of respecting the land and criticizes the greed and selfishness of mankind. The “civil societal” characters are background to Natty's heroic natural character. He emerges as the antithesis to wastefulness as demonstrated and embodied in the settlers. Cooper's main theme is wilderness versus established society. While the settlers see wilderness as being tamed by their presence, Natty has a vision of civilized life coexisting with nature. Ideally, he wants to sustain the unique role that this vast unexplored wilderness contributes to the complexity of America.

“It is much better to kill only such you want, without wasting your powder and lead, then to be firing into God’s creatures in such a wicked manner.” (Natty to Judge Marmeduke) – Chapter XXII, The Slaughter of Pigeons

- Description: Alternating between dialogues, Cooper writes extensive descriptive paragraphs to portray the natural wilderness. To him, the natural landscape exemplifies a peaceful wilderness. When the dialogue begins, it shows the disruption that civilization wreaks on the natural abundance of the wilderness. Cooper contrasts the giving, natural and serene wilderness versus the arrogant and greedy society.

Tone: Cooper's tone in The Pioneers is critical and mocking of traditional society, “established society”. The dialogue of the settlers displays the carelessness of their society towards the wilderness. The scene in Chapter II (The Judge's History of Settlement) is an exaggerated depiction of the reactions of the settlers to a falling tree and storm. The naivety of the settlers is portrayed in their responses to their journey into the wilderness. Cooper's mocking and critical tone is seen throughout the novel.

== Characters ==
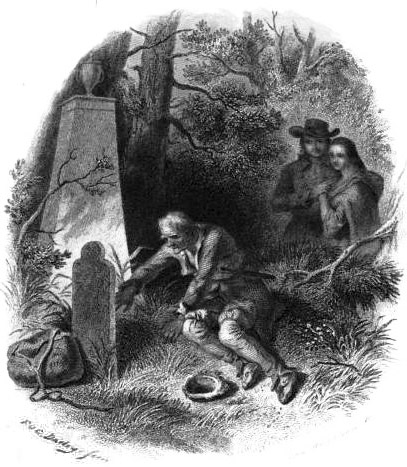
Illustration by Felix Octavius Carr Darley

- Nathaniel "Natty" Bumppo, aka the Leather-stocking, aka Hawk-eye. The hero, an old hunter and patriot, the protagonist of the novel. He is a friend to the Indians and distrustful of civilization. (chapter 1, page 22). He was "a melodious synopsis of man and nature in the West". He emerges as the antithesis to wastefulness demonstrated and embodied in the settlers. Natty represents the frontier in conflict with civilization and the law. In Chapter III, The Slaughter of Pigeons, his character is introduced as one who lived off the land. In contrast to settlers who hunt for sport and kill too many pigeons, he shoots the one needed for his meal.
- Judge Marmaduke Temple - A widower and the founder of Templeton (chapter 1, page 18). He is the trail-blazing leader of the group of pioneers who settle the wilderness of Otsego. He is a strong natural leader with a practical and wise approach. He is appreciative of nature and respectful of its ability to both sustain life and destroy it. He has to lead his people when threatened in the early days with starvation. He is nearly crushed by a falling dead tree in chapter 2. He is a cautious, effective leader, but he also holds a genuine love for the untamed back country. His description of its splendor at the top of a mountain he named “Mount Vision” is a testament to his respect for the beauties of nature. Marmaduke's opinions are synonymous with those of Leather-stocking, yet his seemingly incorruptible attitude is blemished at the end of the pigeon hunt, when he joins in the annihilation of hundreds of the birds. When the hunt is over, the ‘Duke feels a pang of guilt, for “after the excitement of the moment has passed, that he has purchased pleasure at the price of misery to others.” Marmaduke's character represents settlers who were conscious and aware of their intrusive and sometime destructive ways. Throughout the story he is respectful toward Leather-stocking as well as the lands he controls.
- Agamemnon "Aggy" - A slave of the Judge (New York did not fully abolish slavery until the 1820s)
- Elizabeth "Bess" Temple - Daughter of the Judge and romantic interest of Oliver (chapter 5, page 66)
- Richard "Dick" Jones - The cousin of the Judge (chapter 4, page 47), and “The Sheriff." He is the right-hand man of Marmaduke. He holds a systematic, “ends-justify-the-means” approach to solving problems. He claims that to avoid falling trees, one needs to avoid every tree in the forest with rotten base wood. When posed with the issue of bringing down the pigeons to feed the village, he uses an artillery cannon. Richard likes to “fish with dynamite,” figuratively speaking. He is the foil of Leather-stocking, who is frugal and weighted by morals. Richard's character represents settlers who were ignorant of the land and people they disturbed while trying to make new lives. He is generally concerned with his own survival and prosperity with little regard to people such as Leather-stocking and the land.
- Squire Hiram Doolittle - An architect, justice of the peace, and buddy of Dick Jones
- Monsieur Le Quoi - A French nobleman exiled by their violent revolution; he becomes a shopkeeper in Templeton (chapter 4, page 47)
- Major Frederick "Fritz" Hartmann - A German settler in the area and regular visitor to the Judge's house (chapter 4, page 48)
- The Reverend Mr. Grant - An Episcopal minister (chapter 4, page 48) (The Episcopal Church was established in the United States after the Revolution, replacing the Anglican Church, which had been the established church in the South.)
- Ben Pump, aka Mr. Pump, aka Benjamin Penguillan - A servant to the Judge, and a former seaman who doesn't know how to swim (chapter 5, page 60)
- Remarkable Pettibone - Housekeeper to the Judge (chapter 5, page 62)
- Old Brave - The Temples' faithful dog.
- Dr. Elnathan Todd - The town doctor (chapter 6, page 71)
- Indian John, aka John Mohegan, aka Chingachgook - considered the last of the Mohicans and Natty's faithful companion (chapter 7, page 85)
- Oliver Edwards, aka Young Eagle - The young hunter and friend to Natty and Indian John (chapter 3, page 38)
- Captain and Mrs. Hollister - Owners of the inn, The Bold Dragoon
- Squire Chester Lippet - a lawyer who talks too much
- Louisa Grant - The daughter of Mr. Grant, companion to Elizabeth, and a possible love interest for Oliver Effingham
- Billy Kirby - A lumberjack and crack-shot with a rifle (chapter 17, page 190)
- Squire Van der School - The "honest" lawyer of Judge Marmaduke (chapter 25, page 277)
- Jotham Riddle - A lazy fellow appointed as a magistrate by Sheriff Jones
- Sir Oliver Effingham - British aristocrat

== Reception ==
Based on a reading of The Pioneers, The British Magazine dubbed Cooper the best and most original of all United States authors, but nevertheless charged him with copying the style of Sir Walter Scott. The Literary Gazette critiqued the story as not so much a novel but a collection of pleasant depictions of American scenery. The Newcastle Magazine called it one of America's best novels. John Neal in American Writers (1824–25) critiqued the novel's character traits as repetitive but nevertheless praised Bumppo as true to life. Cooper's contemporary James Gates Percival was particularly upset that what he called a "vulgar book" made its author one of the most famous in the country, writing privately, "But to have the author step forward on such stilts and claim to be the lion of our national literature... why, it is pitiful, 'tis wondrous pitiful, at least for the country that not only suffers it, but encourages it".

== Film adaptation ==
The novel inspired The Pioneers, a film released by Monogram Pictures in 1941.
