= Hawkeye and the Last of the Mohicans =

1957 Canadian television series

- Genre: Historical drama
- Starring: John Hart; Lon Chaney Jr.
- Country of origin: Canada
- Original language: English
- No. of seasons: 1
- No. of episodes: 39

Production
- Running time: 30 minutes

Original release
- Network: CBC Television
- Release: 1957 – 1957

The Last of the Mohicans, later retitled Hawkeye and the Last of the Mohicans, is a 1957 historical drama television series made for syndication by ITC Entertainment and Normandie Productions. It ran for one season of 39 half-hour monochrome episodes. The series is available on DVD and some episodes on VHS.

== Plot ==
Loosely based on the 1826 novel The Last of the Mohicans by James Fenimore Cooper, the series was released under several different names, including Hawkeye and The Last of the Mohicans.

The series was set in New York's Hudson Valley in the 1750s but was filmed in Canada. The end credits state that the series was filmed in Canada with the cooperation of the Canadian Broadcasting Corporation.

The series had a more realistic view of America than most series of the times. The settlers were rough and dressed in old but suitable clothes for the long hard winters in the small settlements of the new frontier. The Native Americans were more realistically portrayed too, as an intelligent people with good and bad individuals among them. Fights in the film needed more than just the odd blow as the opponents hit hard at each other, and torture was used in a number of episodes. Weapons used were normally single shot rifles and tomahawks (which often ended up in someone's back). Furs were often a motive of crime as they were the currency of the northern settlements.

== Main cast ==
- John Hart as Nat Cutler (aka "Hawkeye")
- Lon Chaney Jr. as Chingachgook

== Filming locations ==
=== Outdoor scenes ===
- Valley Farm Rd., 3rd Concession and Brock Road area
- Duffins Creek valley up through to just north of Whites Road and Taunton Road in Pickering, Ontario

=== Indoor scenes ===
Lakeshore Studios, Toronto, Ontario, Canada

== Episode list ==
This episode list is in airdate order, based on the earliest known syndication showing of each episode in the United States.

1. Hawkeye's Homecoming
2. The Threat
3. Franklin Story
4. The Wild One
5. Delaware Hoax
6. The Coward
7. Ethan Allen Story
8. The Witch
9. The Medicine Man
10. The Servant
11. The Search
12. Snake Tattoo
13. False Witness
14. Powder Keg
15. Scapegoat
16. Way Station
17. The Brute
18. Stubborn Pioneer
19. The Promised Valley
20. The Girl
21. The Soldier
22. Huron Tomahawk
23. Tolliver Gang
24. The Colonel and his Lady
25. Washington Story
26. Winter Passage
27. The Reckoning
28. La Salle's Treasure
29. The Prisoner
30. False Faces
31. The Morristown Story
32. Revenge
33. The Contest
34. The Truant
35. The Royal Grant
36. The Long Rifles
37. The Printer
38. The Indian Doll
39. Circle of Hate

== DVD releases ==
On November 21, 2006, Timeless Media Group released a 2-disc best-of set featuring 10 episodes from the series.

In 2011, Network in the UK released remastered versions of all 39 episodes on a five-disc DVD set, catalogue number 7953072.
