= Kenneth Ives =

British actor and director (1934–2022)

- Born: Kenneth Ainsworth Ives; 26 March 1934
- Died: 6 March 2022 (aged 87)
- Occupation: Actor
- Spouse(s): Valeria Ann Comber-Brown (m. 1958, divorced) Imogen Hassall (m. 1974; div. 1978) Marti Caine (m. 1984; died 1995)

Kenneth Ainsworth Ives (26 March 1934 – 6 March 2022) was a British actor turned television director with a number of 1960s and 1970s television credits.

As an actor, he appeared in the 1968 film version of The Lion in Winter as Queen Eleanor's guard, the 1971 BBC serial The Last of the Mohicans as Hawkeye, and had roles in Adam Adamant Lives!, The First Churchills, and as one of the eponymous villains in the Doctor Who story The Dominators.

In later years, he concentrated on directing, with credits for television productions of Strindberg's The Father (1985) and Harold Pinter's The Birthday Party (1987) for the BBC's Theatre Night series, as well as episodes of Poldark, Gangsters, Softly, Softly: Taskforce, All Creatures Great and Small and Secret Army.

Ives died on 6 March 2022, at the age of 87.

== Filmography ==
Year	Title	Role	Notes
1967	The Deadly Affair	Stagehand	Uncredited
1968	The Lion in Winter	Queen Eleanor's guard	
