= Philip Madoc =

Welsh actor (1934–2012)

- Madoc (left) with Arthur Lowe in Dad's Army
- Born: Philip Arvon Jones; 5 July 1934; Merthyr Tydfil, Glamorgan, Wales
- Died: 5 March 2012 (aged 77); Northwood, London, England
- Education: Royal Academy of Dramatic Art
- Occupation: Actor
- Years active: 1962–2012
- Spouses: Ruth Baker (m. 1961; div. 1981) Diane Harmer (m. 1987; div. 2010)
- Children: 2

Philip Madoc (born Philip Arvon Jones; 5 July 1934 – 5 March 2012) was a Welsh actor. He performed many stage, television, radio and film roles, and was recognised for having a "rich, sonorous voice" and often playing villains and officers.

On television, he starred as David Lloyd George in The Life and Times of David Lloyd George (1981) and DCI Noel Bain in the detective series A Mind to Kill (1994–2002). His guest roles included multiple appearances in the cult series The Avengers (1962–68) and Doctor Who (1968–69, 1976, 1978–79), as well as playing the U-boat captain in the Dad's Army episode "The Deadly Attachment" (1973). He was also known to be an accomplished linguist.

== Early life ==
Madoc was born near Merthyr Tydfil and attended Cyfarthfa Castle Grammar School, where he was a member of the cricket and rugby teams, and displayed talent as a linguist. He then studied languages at University College Cardiff and the University of Vienna. He eventually spoke seven languages, including Russian and Swedish, and had a working knowledge of Huron Indian, Hindi and Mandarin. He worked as an interpreter, but became disenchanted with having to translate for politicians: "I did dry-as-dust jobs like political interpreting. You get to despise politicians when you have to translate the rubbish they spout." He then switched to acting and won a place at the Royal Academy of Dramatic Art (RADA).

== Acting career ==
The two things people will remember him for will be playing Lloyd-George and 'Don't tell him, Pike' from Dad's Army. How splendid to be remembered for something so serious and something so funny.

— Wyn Calvin on Madoc's legacy.

Madoc acted on stage with the Welsh Theatre Company playing Thomas Cromwell in a 1962 tour of A Man for All Seasons before joining the Royal Shakespeare Company, playing the roles of Iago, Othello and Dr Faustus. As a television actor he first gained widespread recognition in two serials, first as the relentless SS Officer Lutzig in the Second World War serial Manhunt (1969), and then as the vicious Huron warrior Magua in a serialisation of The Last of the Mohicans (1971).

According to The Daily Telegraph, BBC News and The Times, Madoc is especially remembered for his role in "The Deadly Attachment", an episode of the comedy Dad's Army in which he played a U-boat captain held prisoner by the Walmington-on-Sea platoon of the Home Guard. He asks Pike for his name so he can be added to his "list" for the day of reckoning after the war is won, prompting Captain Mainwaring's famous line "Don't tell him, Pike!" Madoc also played a German villain Freddi von Flugel in the TV series Fortunes of War (TV series), directed by James Cellan Jones.

He also appeared in five episodes of the TV series The Avengers between 1963 and 1969 ("The Decapod", "Six Hands Across a Table", "Death of a Batman", "The Correct Way to Kill", "My Wildest Dream").

In 1977 he appeared as Dr Evans in the television adaptation of Andrea Newman's book Another Bouquet (the sequel to A Bouquet of Barbed Wire). In 1978 he played a corrupt and lecherous priest, Vicar Davyd, in the BBC Wales serial Hawkmoor.

Madoc starred in the detective series A Mind to Kill as DCI Noel Bain. This series was made simultaneously in Welsh and English from 1994 to 2002. He appeared in episodes of the BBC sitcoms The Good Life and Porridge ("Disturbing The Peace"), and in a controversial episode of The Goodies ("South Africa"), which satirised apartheid. He took the lead role in the BBC Wales drama The Life and Times of David Lloyd George.

Films in which Madoc appeared included Operation Crossbow (1965), The Quiller Memorandum (1966), Berserk! (1967), Doppelgänger (1969), Hell Boats (1970), Dr. Jekyll and Sister Hyde (1971), Soft Beds, Hard Battles (1974) and Operation Daybreak (1975). His later film performances included Leon Trotsky in Zina (1985), and Jimmy Murphy in the football movie Best (2000).

Madoc presented an educational 1960s BBC television series, Komm mit! Wir sprechen Deutsch: German by television.

== Science-fiction roles ==
Madoc is well known to fans of Doctor Who for multiple appearances relating to the series, almost always playing villains. He acted a small role in the second Peter Cushing film, Daleks' Invasion Earth 2150 A.D. (1966), and was later cast in the television series itself four times. He appeared in two Second Doctor serials, The Krotons (1968) as Eelek and The War Games (1969) as the War Lord. He appeared in two Fourth Doctor serials, The Brain of Morbius (1976) as Solon and The Power of Kroll (1978–79) as Fenner. He recorded DVD commentaries for The Krotons, The War Games and The Brain of Morbius and was interviewed about his roles in Doctor Who in the short film "Philip Madoc - a Villain for All Seasons", which appeared as an extra on the DVD for The Power of Kroll. He revealed in the interview that he regretted taking the final role (The Power of Kroll) because it was a less interesting character. In 2003, he guest-starred in the Big Finish Doctor Who audio adventure Master, and returned to Big Finish in the 2008 Sixth Doctor story Return of the Krotons. He voiced the War King in the Faction Paradox audio series.

He appeared twice in the drama series UFO, once as the partner of Ed Straker's estranged wife (in A question of priorities) and once as the captain of a British warship under attack by the aliens (in Destruction). In the pilot episode of Space: 1999 (1975) he had a brief appearance as Commander Anton Gorski, who was replaced by Commander John Koenig for the remainder of the series. In addition to his minor role of Anton Gorski, his likeness later appeared in the comic book adaptation of the Space 1999 saga, where his character's previously minor role was expanded upon. He also made a guest appearance in Survivors.

== Other roles ==
Madoc's voice can be heard reading Bible quotations on a variant of the VoCo alarm clock. He also starred as Ellis Peters's medieval detective Brother Cadfael in the BBC Radio 4 adaptations of Monk's Hood, The Virgin in the Ice and Dead Man's Ransom. He recorded a 12-CD audiobook of selections from Edward Gibbon's Decline and Fall of the Roman Empire.

In 2001 Madoc voiced the role of "Prospero" for the BBC Radio 3 production of The Tempest. Madoc read the 2011 audiobook retranslation Dr Zhivago. The Welsh actor voiced Gwydion in Y Mabinogi (Otherworld) (2003), featuring Daniel Evans, Jenny Livsey and Matthew Rhys.

In 2007 Madoc appeared as "Y Llywydd" (The President) in the S4C gangster series Y Pris, in which he spoke in his native Welsh. He was the narrator for the Discovery Channel documentary series Egypt Uncovered.

== Selected theatre performances ==
- The Mayor in The Government Inspector by Nikolai Gogol. Directed by Braham Murray at the Royal Exchange, Manchester (1983)
- Claudius in Hamlet. Directed by Braham Murray at the Royal Exchange, Manchester (1983)
- Father Mapple in Moby Dick. World premiere adapted and directed by Michael Elliott at the Royal Exchange, Manchester (1984)
- Fyodor Pavlovich Karamazov in The Brothers Karamazov adapted by Gerard McLarnon. World premiere directed by Braham Murray at the Royal Exchange, Manchester (1993)
- Godfrey Pond in The Happiest Days of Your Life by John Dighton. Directed by Braham Murray at the Royal Exchange, Manchester (2003)

== Personal life ==
Philip Madoc's first marriage, to the actress Ruth Madoc, lasted for twenty years. They had a son and a daughter, and divorced in 1981. Madoc's second marriage, which also ended in divorce, was to Diane Harmer.

He was patron of Best Theatre Arts, a theatre school in St Albans and president of the London Welsh Male Voice Choir .

Madoc was a keen supporter of Welsh nationalism and a long-standing member of Plaid Cymru.

Madoc was a fan of boxing, and especially of boxer David Pearce, and was one of the 2,500 people who attended his funeral.

It was stated in January 2012 that Madoc had been diagnosed with cancer. He died, aged 77, on 5 March 2012 at the Michael Sobell Hospice in Northwood, northwest London. He was cremated at the West Hertfordshire Crematorium in Watford.

== Filmography ==
Film
| Year | Title | Role | Notes |
|---|---|---|---|
| 1961 | On the Fiddle | Soldier at Black Rock | Uncredited |
| 1965 | Operation Crossbow | German Police Officer | Uncredited |
| 1965 | A High Wind in Jamaica | Guardia Civile | |
| 1965 | For Whom the Bell Tolls | Fernando | |
| 1965 | The Spy Who Came In from the Cold | Young German Officer | Uncredited |
| 1966 | Daleks' Invasion Earth 2150 A.D. | Brockley | |
| 1966 | The Quiller Memorandum | Oktober's Man | |
| 1967 | Berserk! | Lazlo | |
| 1968 | Deadfall | Bank Manager | Uncredited |
| 1969 | The Assassination Bureau | Officer | Uncredited |
| 1969 | Doppelgänger | Dr. Pontini | |
| 1969 | The Spy Killer | Gar | |
| 1970 | Hell Boats | 'E' Boat Captain | |
| 1971 | Dr. Jekyll and Sister Hyde | Byker | |
| 1973 | Bequest to the Nation | French captain | Uncredited |
| 1974 | Soft Beds, Hard Battles | Field Marshal Weber | |
| 1975 | Operation Daybreak | Heydrich's interpreter | |
| 1982 | Ennals Point | Jack Tustin - Lifeboat coxswain | |
| 1985 | Zina | Leon Trotsky | |
| 1991 | A Mind to Kill | Detective Inspector Noel Bain | |
| 2000 | Best | Jimmy Murphy | |
| 2003 | Den of Lions | Grandpa Marcus | |
| 2003 | Y Mabinogi | Gwydion | Voice |
