= David Shipman (colonist) =

David Shipman (1730 – 1813) is generally considered to be the real-life inspiration for James Fenimore Cooper's character Natty Bumppo in the Leatherstocking Tales along with a pioneer man named Thomas Leffingwell, a co-founder of Norwich, Connecticut, whose son founded the Leffingwell Inn, now a museum. When Cooper's father William Cooper settled in what is now Otsego County, New York in the mid-1780s, Shipman lived alone in a small cabin in the hills south of the village of Cooperstown, a squatter on the land of Cooper's neighbor John Christopher Hartwick.

Shipman was a veteran of the American Revolution and had a reputation locally as an expert hunter and fisherman. During the author's youth, Shipman would often appear at the Cooper home, Otsego Hall, to offer the family some of his latest products. Susan Fenimore Cooper wrote that "rude equipments, dogs, and rifle, had much attraction for the lads of the house". James Cooper referred to Shipman in his Chronicles of Cooperstown as "the 'Leather Stocking' of the region, ... could at almost any time, furnish the table with a saddle of venison".
