= The Deerslayer (1957 film) =

1957 film by Kurt Neumann

- Theatrical release poster
- Directed by: Kurt Neumann
- Screenplay by: Carroll Young; Kurt Neumann; Dalton Trumbo (uncredited)
- Based on: The Deerslayer by James Fenimore Cooper
- Produced by: Kurt Neumann
- Starring: Lex Barker; Rita Moreno; Forrest Tucker; Cathy O'Donnell; Jay C. Flippen; Carlos Rivas
- Cinematography: Karl Struss
- Edited by: Jodie Copelan
- Music by: Paul Sawtell; Bert Shefter
- Production company: Regal Films
- Distributed by: 20th Century Fox
- Release date: September 10, 1957
- Running time: 78 minutes
- Country: United States
- Language: English
- Budget: $200,000
- Box office: $2 million (est)

The Deerslayer is a 1957 American Western film in CinemaScope and Color by De Luxe, directed by Kurt Neumann and written by Carroll Young, Neumann and an uncredited Dalton Trumbo. The film stars Lex Barker, Rita Moreno, Forrest Tucker, Cathy O'Donnell, Jay C. Flippen and Carlos Rivas. It is based on the 1841 novel The Deerslayer by James Fenimore Cooper. The film was released on September 10, 1957, by 20th Century-Fox.

== Plot ==
Frontiersman Deerslayer and his Mohican blood brother Chingachgook are attacked by a scout for a Huron war party. Dispatching the Huron, they hear war cries from the river and help white trader Harry March, who is being chased by the war party in canoes. Deerslayer and Chingachgook, cannot understand why the Hurons have gone on the warpath so far west of the white settlements. Harry tells them that he is making for a floating fort moored in the middle of Lake Otsego, on which old Tom Hutter and his two daughters, Judith and Hetty, live. Harry needs the help of Deerslayer and Chingachgook to deliver the girls to safety in Albany. When they arrive at the fort, Deerslayer and Chingachgook offer their help because a band of Hurons is coming down the river, but they are shunned by Tom, who knows why the Hurons are about to attack but is also trying to hide a sinister secret.

== Cast ==
- Lex Barker as Deerslayer
- Rita Moreno as Hetty Hutter
- Forrest Tucker as Harry March
- Cathy O'Donnell as Judith Hutter
- Jay C. Flippen as Old Tom Hutter
- Carlos Rivas as Chingachgook
- Joseph Vitale as Huron chief
- John Halloran as Old Warrior
