= Chingachgook =

Fictional character created by James Fenimore Cooper

- Leatherstocking Tales/The Last of the Mohicans character
- Gojko Mitić playing Chingachgook the Great Serpent, in the East German western film of the same name.
- First appearance: The Pioneers (1823)
- Last appearance: The Deerslayer (1841)
- Created by: James Fenimore Cooper

In-universe information
- Aliases: Le Gros Serpent, Indian John, John Mohican
- Gender: Male
- Occupation: Chief
- Spouse: Wah-ta-Wah (wife)
- Children: Uncas (son)
- Religion: Mahican tradition, Moravian convert
- Nationality: Mahican

Chingachgook is a fictional character in four of James Fenimore Cooper's five Leatherstocking Tales, including his 1826 novel The Last of the Mohicans. Chingachgook was a lone Mohican chief and companion of the series' hero, Natty Bumppo. In The Deerslayer (1841), Chingachgook married Wah-ta-Wah, who had a son with him named Uncas, but died while she was still young. Uncas, who was at his birth "last of the Mohicans", grew to manhood but was killed in a battle with the Huron warrior Magua. Chingachgook died as an old man in the novel The Pioneers (1823), which made him the actual "last of the Mohicans", having outlived his son.

== The Leatherstocking Tales ==
In the series The Leatherstocking Tales by James Fenimore Cooper, Chingachgook is the best friend and companion of the main character Natty Bumppo, aka Hawkeye. He appears in The Deerslayer, The Last of the Mohicans, The Pathfinder, and The Pioneers. He is characterized by his skills as a warrior and forester, his bravery, his wisdom, and his pride for his tribe.

== Other literature ==
Chingachgook is a major character in Song of the Mohicans by Paul Block (Bantam Books, 1985, ISBN 978-0553565584), a sequel to The Last of the Mohicans. Taking up the story a few days after Uncas' death and burial, it recounts the adventures of Hawkeye and Chingachgook as they travel north to discover the connection between an Oneida brave and the Mohican tribe, and whether a sachem truly holds the key to the ultimate fate of the Mohicans.

== Etymology and pronunciation ==
Chingachgook is said to have been modeled after a real-life wandering Mohican basket maker and hunter named Captain John. The fictional character, occasionally called John Mohegan in the series, was an idealized embodiment of the traditional noble savage. The French often refer to Chingachgook as "Le Gros Serpent", the Great Snake, because he understands the winding ways of men's nature and he can strike a sudden, deadly blow.

The name is derived from the Lenape language, which is closely related to the Mohican language. In Lenape, xinkw- means 'big' and xkuk means 'snake'. Professor William A. Starna, of SUNY Oneonta, says the initial "ch" sound would be pronounced more like the German guttural "h" than an English "ch". The digraph ⟨ch⟩ in the spelling used by John Heckewelder, the source for the name, and the letter ⟨x⟩ in modern Lenape spelling both represent the voiceless velar fricative sound [x] (as in "Bach"), not the voiceless palato-alveolar affricate [t͡ʃ] (as in "church").

Cooper got the name from Heckewelder's book History, Manners, and Customs of the Indian Nations who once inhabited Pennsylvania and the Neighboring States (1818), which cited a Lenape word as "chingachgook" (in Heckewelder's spelling which was influenced by German), meaning "a large snake". He gave this word as such in the context of how to use the adjective xinkwi (pronounced [xiŋɡwi]) 'large', which Heckewelder spelled chingue.

== Portrayals in film and television ==
The first film portrayal of Chingachgook was by Wallace Reid in a 1913 film version of The Deerslayer.

Theodore Lorch played Chingachgook in the 1920 film version of The Last of the Mohicans co-directed by Clarence Brown and Maurice Tourneur.

Bela Lugosi played Chingachgook in two German silent films, Lederstrumpf, 1. Teil: Der Wildtöter und Chingachgook (Leatherstocking 1: The Deerslayer and Chingachgook) and Lederstrumpf, 2. Teil: Der Letzte der Mohikaner (Leatherstocking 2: The Last of the Mohicans), both filmed in 1920.

In the 1932 Mascot movie serial of The Last of the Mohicans, Chingachgook was played by Hobart Bosworth.

Robert Barrat played Chingachgook in the 1936 film version of The Last of the Mohicans.

Jay Silverheels, best known for his role as Tonto on The Lone Ranger, played Chingachgook in the 1953 film version of The Pathfinder.

Lon Chaney Jr. played Chingachgook in the 1957 TV series Hawkeye and the Last of the Mohicans.

Chingachgook, played by Gojko Mitić, was the main character of an East German western, Chingachgook the Great Serpent (1967), based on Cooper's novels.

In the BBC miniseries The Last of the Mohicans (1971) and Hawkeye, the Pathfinder (1973), Chingachgook was played by John Abineri.

Chingachgook was played by Ned Romero in the TV versions of The Last of the Mohicans (1977) and The Deerslayer (1978), by Roger Hill in the 1984 PBS miniseries Once Upon A Classic: The Leatherstocking Tales, by Russell Means in the 1992 film adaptation of The Last of the Mohicans, by Rodney A. Grant in the 1994 TV series Hawkeye and by Graham Greene in the 1996 TV version of The Pathfinder.

Many films portray Chingachgook with long hair, braided or flowing. Two notable exceptions are the 1920 adaptation and the 1996 TV-film version of The Pathfinder, which faithfully represent him with a tuft on his shaved head, according to the novel.

== In Boy Scout legend ==
In the Ordeal Ceremony of the Order of the Arrow, the National Honor Society of the Boy Scouts of America, the Legend of the Order refers to an imaginary Lenni Lenape chief named Chingachgook. In the legend, Chingachgook's son, Uncas, is the original propagator of the Order. Chingachgook wanted to create a band of volunteers from all the nations of the Delaware River valley to support and protect their collective interests. Uncas volunteered to be the first member of such a group, and thus the Order of the Arrow was founded.

According to the Boy Scouts of America's Ordeal Ceremony, the preferred pronunciation of the name is "ching-gatch-gook".
