= The Last of the Mohicans (TV series) =

- Genre: Adventure drama
- Based on: The Last of the Mohicans by James Fenimore Cooper
- Written by: Harry Green
- Directed by: David Maloney
- Starring: John Abineri; Kenneth Ives; Philip Madoc; Richard Warwick; Patricia Maynard
- Country of origin: United Kingdom
- Original language: English
- No. of series: 1
- No. of episodes: 8

Production
- Producer: John Mcrae
- Running time: 44-46 minutes

Original release
- Network: BBC One
- Release: 17 January – 7 March 1971

The Last of the Mohicans is a 1971 eight-part BBC serial, based on the 1826 novel of the same name by James Fenimore Cooper, directed by David Maloney.

It was shown during the Sunday tea time slot on BBC One, which for several years showed fairly faithful adaptations of classic novels aimed at a family audience. In 1972 it was shown in America as part of the Masterpiece Theatre series.

The serial consisted of eight 45-minute episodes.

Near the start, Chingachook introduces his son Uncas, saying "Uncas is the last of the Mohicans". After Uncas is killed, the final line in the serial is Chingachgook saying in a sad voice, "I am the last of the Mohicans".

The serial was responsible for popularising the term "Mohican hairstyle" for what is known as a Mohawk hairstyle in the US, although it was actually worn by the Hurons not the Mohicans in the serial.

This production was released on DVD, distributed by Acorn Media UK.

== Plot ==
During the French and Indian War, British scouts Nathaniel "Hawkeye" Bumppo and his Mohican allies, Chingachgook and Uncas, while on a scouting excursion from British outpost Fort William Henry, come across a party consisting of Major Duncan Heyward and Cora and Alice Munro, the daughters of Colonel Munro, the commanding officer of Fort William Henry; Heyward and the Munro daughters are journeying to Fort William Henry to join their father, but have been misled by a supposedly friendly Indian named Magua, who turns out to be a hostile Huron. After driving off a Huron war party, Hawkeye, Chingachgook and Uncas agree to guide the party to the fort, but must stay one step ahead of the vengeful Magua and his Huron warriors, who are on their trail. In the meantime, Fort William Henry is being besieged by the French forces commanded by General Montcalm, and Colonel Munro, who hopes for reinforcements from General Webb back in Albany, realizes that he can't hold out much longer.

== Sequel ==
In 1973 the BBC made a sequel Hawkeye, the Pathfinder, also with Abineri as Chingachook but with Paul Massie as Hawkeye, also starring Patrick Troughton. It was produced for North America by 20th Century-Fox Television and broadcast by ABC in the United States.

== Cast ==
- Colonel Munro: Andrew Crawford
- Major Duncan Heyward: Tim Goodman
- Hawkeye: Kenneth Ives
- Magua: Philip Madoc
- Chingachgook: John Abineri
- Uncas: Richard Warwick
- Cora Munro: Patricia Maynard
- Alice Munro: Joanna David

== Reception ==
It is considered by some people to be the most faithful and the best of the various film and TV adaptations of The Last of the Mohicans, as well as one of the best of the BBC's Sunday adaptations. Compared with some other adaptations of the novel it was made on a relatively low budget (much of it was shot in the studio, although there were scenes shot on location in Scotland) and it included some dated elements (the American Indians were all played by white actors in makeup). However, it was praised for the quality of the acting, particularly the performance as Magua by Philip Madoc, an experienced Welsh TV actor who often played villains, and Richard Warwick as Uncas.

In a contemporary review in The New York Times, John J. O'Connor criticized the "natural handicap of vocal accents" of British actors portraying Native Americans. He summarized; "The over‐all production, complete with forest battles and canoe joustings, is excellent. The color photography is first‐rate. And most of the performances, in the B.B.C. tradition, are superb."
