= John Abineri =

English actor (1928–2000)

- Abineri in Whodunnit? (1976)
- Born: John Frederick Abineri; 18 May 1928; London, United Kingdom
- Died: 29 June 2000 (aged 72); Bath, United Kingdom
- Education: Old Vic Theatre School
- Occupation: Actor
- Years active: 1955–1999
- Spouse: Hilary Bamford
- Children: 4, including Daniel Abineri

John Abineri (18 May 1928 – 29 June 2000) was an English actor.

Born in London, he attended the Old Vic Theatre School and described himself as "Well educated from the age of five to eighteen". He spoke a number of languages (including German, Russian and French) fluently, which led to him being cast as a number of different nationalities.

His extensive television performances included numerous roles in cult TV drama series, for which he is now probably best remembered. He had regular roles in Survivors as Hubert Goss, and in HTV's Robin of Sherwood as Herne the Hunter. He appeared on four occasions in Doctor Who and also in the Blake's 7 episode "Hostage", taking over the role of Ushton after the sudden death of the actor Duncan Lamont, with whom he had co-starred in the Doctor Who serial Death to the Daleks. He also appeared as Sir George Mortenhurze in the BBC's The Moon Stallion, as Arnold Rimmer's father in Red Dwarf, and as Father Gruber in the 1989 TV adaptation of Around the World in 80 Days.

He received an Emmy nomination for his performance as Chingachgook in the TV adaptation of Last Of The Mohicans (1971) and Hawkeye, the Pathfinder (1973). He also played the butler in the original Ferrero Rocher Ambassador's reception advert.

His film credits include roles in Funeral in Berlin (1966), The McKenzie Break (1970), Pope Joan (1972), The Godfather Part III (1990) and Giorgino (1994).

He was the father of actors Sebastian Abineri, Daniel Abineri and Jaz Abineri.

== Selected film and TV roles ==
- The White Trap (1959) - Bernie - photographer (uncredited)
- The Rebel (1960) - artist at party (uncredited)
- House of Mystery (1961) - shop assistant
- Echo of Barbara (1961) - Rankin
- The Password Is Courage (1962) - German officer (uncredited)
- Operation Crossbow (1965) - German policeman (uncredited)
- Dead Man's Chest, (Edgar Wallace Mysteries) (1965) - Arthur
- Funeral in Berlin (1966) - Rukel
- The Baron (1966) - Cerdan
- The Magnificent Two (1967) - official (uncredited)
- Doctor Who: Fury from the Deep (1968) - Van Lutyens
- Attack on the Iron Coast (1968) - German gunnery sergeant (uncredited)
- The Assassination Bureau (1969) - Police Inspector (uncredited)
- Pegasus (1969, TV series) - Louis Rene Lavassoir Latouche
- Special Branch (1969, TV series) - Comber
- Doctor Who: The Ambassadors of Death (1970, TV Series) - General Carrington
- The McKenzie Break (1970) - Captain Kranz
- Diamonds Are Forever (1971) - airline representative (uncredited)
- Pope Joan (1972) - church official
- Doctor Who: Death to the Daleks (1974, TV Series) - Richard Railton
- Soft Beds, Hard Battles (1974) - Prefect of Police (uncredited)
- Operation: Daybreak (1975) - (uncredited)
- Survivors (1976-1977, TV Series) - Hubert Goss
- Doctor Who: The Power of Kroll (1978-1979, TV Series) - Ranquin
- A Tale of Two Cities (1980, TV series) - roadmender
- Robin of Sherwood (1984-1986, TV Series) - Herne the Hunter
- Honour, Profit and Pleasure (1985, TV film) - George I
- The Godfather Part III (1990) - Hamilton Banker
- Giorgino (1994) - Dr Jodel
- The Window Bed (1999) - Jack (final film role)
