= The Deerslayer and Chingachgook =

1920 film

- Directed by: Arthur Wellin
- Written by: James Fenimore Cooper (novel); Robert Heymann
- Produced by: Arthur Wellin
- Starring: Bela Lugosi; Emil Mamalock; Herta Heden
- Cinematography: Ernest Plhak
- Release date: 14 September 1920
- Country: Weimar Republic
- Languages: Silent; English intertitles

The Deerslayer and Chingachgook (German: Der Wildtöter und Chingachgook) is the feature-length first part of the two-part 1920 German silent Western film Lederstrumpf (Leatherstocking), directed by Arthur Wellin and featuring Bela Lugosi. It is based on the 1841 novel The Deerslayer by James Fenimore Cooper. The second part is called The Last of the Mohicans (Der Letzte der Mohikaner).

== Cast ==
- Emil Mamelok as Deerslayer
- Herta Heden as Judith Hutter
- Bela Lugosi as Chingachgook
- Gottfried Kraus as Tom Hutter
- Edward Eyseneck as Worley
- Margot Sokolowska as Wah-ta-Wah
- Frau Rehberger as Judith Hutter
- Willy Schroeder as Hartherz
- Herr Söhnlein as Col. Munro
- Heddy Sven as Cora Munro
- Frau Wenkhaus as Alice Munro

== See also ==
- Bela Lugosi filmography
- List of rediscovered films
