= The Last of the Mohicans (1920 American film) =

1920 film by Maurice Tourneur, Clarence Brown

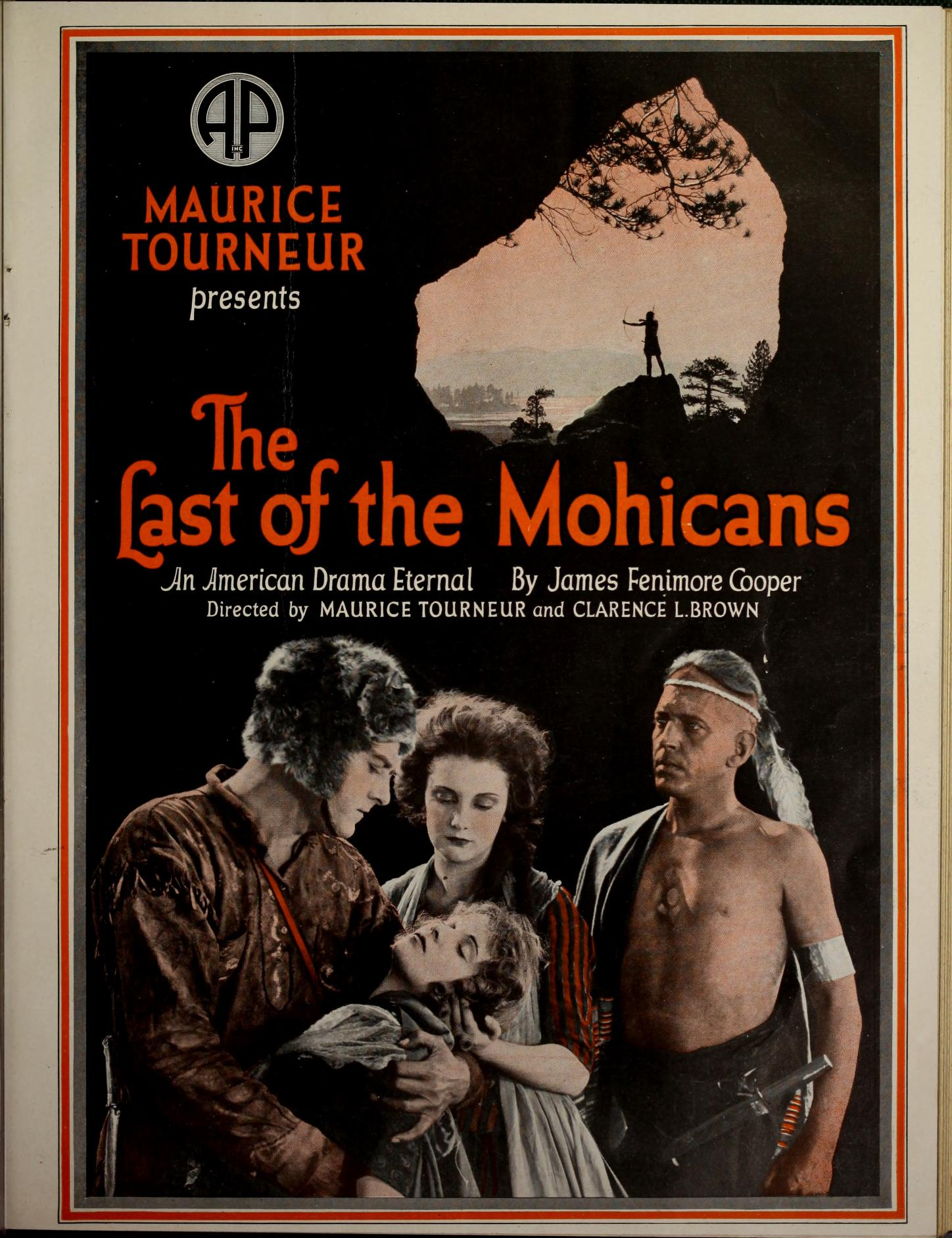
- Advertisement for the film
- Directed by: Maurice Tourneur; Clarence Brown
- Written by: Robert A. Dillon
- Based on: The Last of the Mohicans by James Fenimore Cooper
- Produced by: Maurice Tourneur
- Starring: Wallace Beery; Barbara Bedford; Lillian Hall; Alan Roscoe; Boris Karloff
- Cinematography: Philip R. Dubois; Charles Van Enger
- Music by: Arthur Kay
- Distributed by: Associated Producers, Inc.
- Release date: November 21, 1920
- Running time: 73 minutes
- Country: United States
- Language: Silent (English intertitles)

The Last of the Mohicans is a 1920 American silent adventure drama film written by Robert A. Dillon, adapted from James Fenimore Cooper's 1826 novel of the same name. Clarence Brown and Maurice Tourneur co-directed the film. (Brown took over the direction of the film after Tourneur injured himself in a fall.) It is a story of two English sisters meeting danger on the frontier of the American colonies, in and around the fort commanded by their father. The adventure film stars Wallace Beery, Barbara Bedford, Lillian Hall, Alan Roscoe and Boris Karloff in one of his earliest silent film roles (playing an Indian brave). Barbara Bedford later married her co-star in the film, Alan Roscoe in real life. The production was shot near Big Bear Lake and in Yosemite Valley.

The film was well received at the time of its release. Film historian William K. Everson considers The Last of the Mohicans to be a masterpiece. In 1995, the film was deemed "culturally significant" by the Library of Congress and selected for preservation in the United States National Film Registry.

== Plot ==
The Last of the Mohicans complete film

In 1757, in the midst of the French and Indian War, three French divisions and their Huron Indian allies are advancing on Fort William Henry, a British stronghold south of Lake George in the colony of New York. Chingachgook sends his son Uncas, the last living warrior of the Mohican tribe, to warn the fort's commander, Colonel Munro, of the imminent danger. Uncas is admired by Munro's daughter Cora, much to the displeasure of her suitor, Captain Randolph.

Upon receiving Munro's plea for assistance, General Webb dispatches a relief force of 3000 men to Fort William Henry with the Munro sisters, but with the aid of an Indian runner named Magua, the sisters and Major Heyward take a shortcut through the wilderness. Magua, who is a Huron sympathizer, then pretends to lose his way. In the forest they encounter Uncas, Chingachgook and the hunter and scout Hawkeye, accompanied by an eccentric preacher named David Gamut. When Heyward asks for directions to Fort Edward, the men become suspicious of Magua who, like all Indians in the area, should have an intimate knowledge of the terrain. Their fears of treachery are confirmed when they discover that Magua has disappeared.

Uncas and Hawkeye conceal Heyward and the women in a cave, but Magua and his men find the hiding place, and after a fierce firefight the women are captured. Magua offers to spare "Golden Hair" (Alice) if Cora will become his squaw; but Uncas, Chingachgook and Hawkeye counterattack and rescue the hostages. Although they leave Magua for dead, he is actually uninjured.

The hostages and their rescuers arrive at Fort William Henry at the same time as the column of troops, but the situation is still dire. The only thing keeping the besiegers at bay is a formidable gun emplacement on the left rampart. The cowardly Captain Randolph informs Montcalm, the French commander, that the rampart guns are nonfunctional, leaving Munro no choice but to surrender the fort. Though promised safe passage for the women and children, the Hurons, under the influence of French-supplied whiskey, slaughter the civilians and torch the fort.

Magua kidnaps the Munro sisters for a second time and flees. Uncas and Hawkeye pursue him, but Magua reaches a neutral Delaware village. The dispute is taken before a Delaware council of three; their judgment is that Cora be released to Uncas, and that Alice remain with Magua. To save her sister, Cora offers to take her place. Uncas vows that Magua will not leave with his true love, but by Delaware law, Magua is protected until sundown.

That night, Cora escapes and is pursued by Magua to the edge of a precipice. She threatens to jump if he approaches, so Magua waits patiently for her to fall asleep. When she does, he grabs her arm. She flings herself off the cliff, but Magua still has hold of her arms. When Uncas appears, the situation is reversed: Cora tries to save herself, but Magua uses his knife to pry her fingers loose, and she falls to her death. In the ensuing fight, Magua stabs Uncas, whose body rolls down the embankment to rest near Cora's. Before dying, Uncas reaches forth and takes Cora's hand in his. Magua flees when Chingachgook and Hawkeye arrive, but Hawkeye shoots him dead.

At Cora and Uncas's burial ceremony, Munro laments the passing of his daughter and Chingachgook mourns for his son, the last of the Mohicans.

== Cast ==
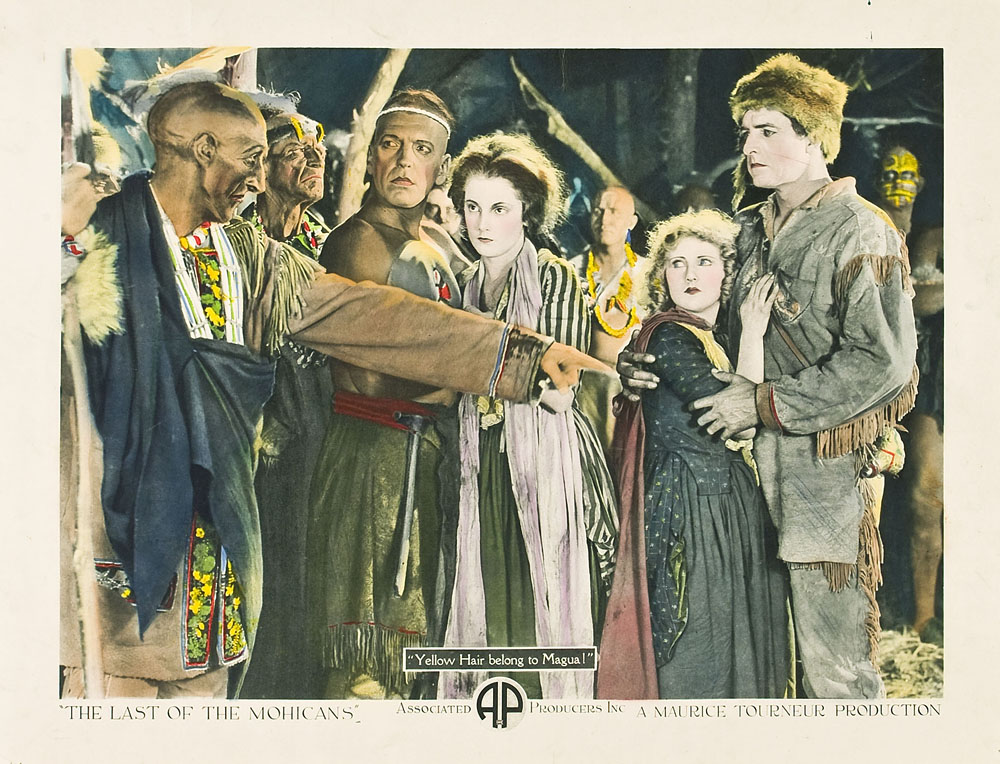
Lobby card

- Wallace Beery as Magua
- Barbara Bedford as Cora Munro
- Lillian Hall as Alice Munro
- Alan Roscoe as Uncas
- Theodore Lorch as Chingachgook
- Harry Lorraine as Hawkeye (aka Natty Bumppo)
- Henry Woodward as Major Heyward
- James Gordon as Colonel Munro
- George Hackathorne as Captain Randolph
- Nelson McDowell as David Gamut
- Jack McDonald as Tamenund
- Sydney Deane as General Webb
- Boris Karloff as an Indian brave (uncredited)
- Joseph Singleton
- Chief Tahachee as an Indian brave (uncredited)

== Critical assessment ==
The Maurice Tourneur and Clarence Brown adaptation of James Fenimore Cooper's 1826 historical novel retains its high stature among film historians and "still considered to be the best film adaption of Cooper’s novel.”

Film historian and biographer Charles Higham offered high praise for the directorial “sophistication” and “daring” in the development of the Cora Munro (Barbara Bedford) character:

“The Last of the Mohicans mood is darker, stranger than anything suggested by James Fenimore Cooper’s robust boy’s book. The darkness wells from the character of the older girl, Cora Munro, played by Barbara Bedford. Prim and proper in her demeanor, she is actually seized by virginal longings, consumed with sexual desire for her Indian guide-protector Uncas (Alan Roscoe). At a time when women in movies were supposed to be mere wilting violets, this explicit sexual frankness must have been an astonishment, and was in truth quite revolutionary. Looking into Miss Bedford’s sly animal eyes, looking at the movement of her mouth, we are already aware of the director’s sophisticated understanding of the medium’s potential for sexual expression. In 1920, this understanding, and the equivalent daring of the actress, whose performance is a triumph of subtle technique, were nothing short of miraculous.”

Acknowledging the “strengths and weaknesses” evident in every cinematic treatment of the famous novel—adaptations of the novel appeared as early as 1911— including the George B. Seitz version in 1936 and the 1992 production by Michael Mann—film critic David Sterritt reports “that for pure visual storytelling and a memorably filmed climax, the silent movie by Tourneur and Brown has proven hard to beat.”
