= Magua =

- The Last of the Mohicans character
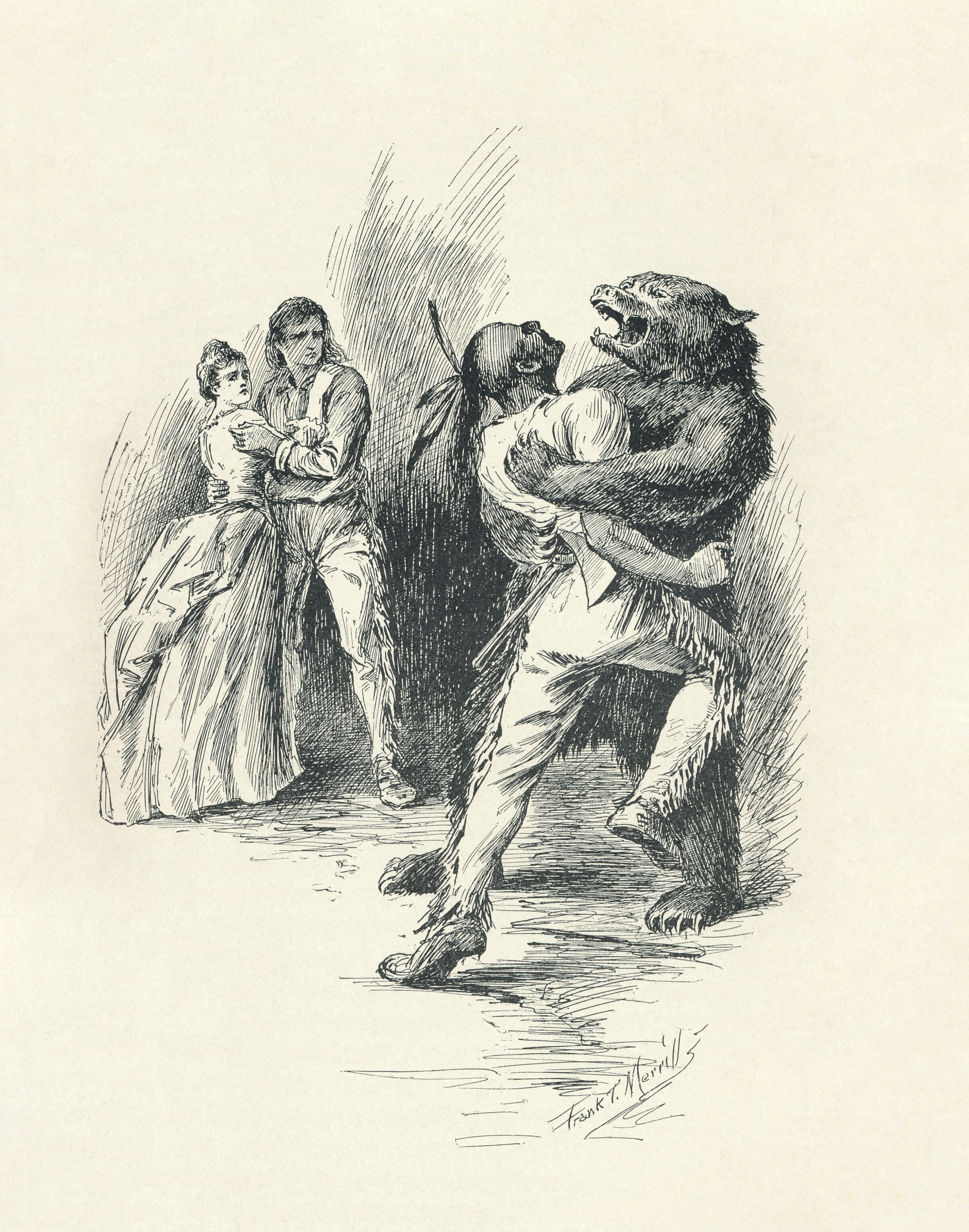
- Magua
- First appearance: The Last of the Mohicans
- Created by: James Fenimore Cooper

In-universe information
- Gender: Male
- Nationality: Wyandot Born ? ? 1710 died August 25 , 1757

Magua is a fictional character and the main antagonist in the 1826 novel The Last of the Mohicans by James Fenimore Cooper. This historical novel is set at the time of the French and Indian War. A Huron Indian chief, he is also known by the French alias "Le Renard Subtil" ("The Wily Fox").

Magua is the enemy of Colonel Munro, the commandant of Fort William Henry, and attempts on several occasions to abduct the colonel's daughters, Cora and Alice. He also assists the French leader, the Marquis de Montcalm, in his attack on the fort.

Magua reveals how his life was shattered by being captured by the Mohawks, the traditional enemies of the Huron. His life was spared, and he was adopted into the tribe. During his time with the Mohawks, Magua met up with Colonel Munro, who punished him by tying him to a whipping-post for drinking whiskey, which he calls fire-water. Later, when he returned to the Huron village, he found that his wife had married another.

In the novel, his attempts to force Munro's daughter Cora to become his wife and his hatred of the English lead to his downfall and death. He captures both daughters, but is pursued by their father, David Gamut, Hawkeye, Chingachgook and Uncas. Magua kills Uncas during his attempt to free Cora, and one of Magua's companions stabs Cora, causing her death. Hawkeye soon shoots Magua, who falls from a cliff shouting his defiance to the end.

In the 1992 film version, Magua blames all his past misfortunes on Colonel Munro and swears to kill both Munro and his two daughters. He captures Munro during an ambush of the British evacuation of the fort, then cuts out his heart after telling his enemy his motives and plans. Later he kills Uncas, then is himself killed by Chingachgook, the father of Uncas.

== Portrayals ==
- The Last of the Mohicans (1920 American film) - Wallace Beery
- The Last of the Mohicans (1932 serial) - Bob Kortman
- The Last of the Mohicans (1936 film) - Bruce Cabot
- Last of the Redskins (1947 film) - Buster Crabbe
- The Last of the Mohicans (1971 TV serial) - Philip Madoc
- Last of the Mohicans (1977 TV film) - Robert Tessier
- The Last of the Mohicans (1992 film) - Wes Studi
