= The Last of the Mohicans (1936 film) =

American historical western adventure film

- Theatrical release poster
- Directed by: George B. Seitz
- Screenplay by: Philip Dunne
- Adaptation by: John Balderston; Paul Perez; Daniel Moore
- Based on: The Last of the Mohicans by James Fenimore Cooper
- Produced by: Edward Small
- Starring: Randolph Scott; Binnie Barnes; Henry Wilcoxon
- Cinematography: Robert H. Planck
- Edited by: Jack Dennis; Harry Marker
- Music by: Roy Webb
- Production company: Edward Small Productions
- Distributed by: United Artists
- Release date: September 4, 1936
- Running time: 92 minutes
- Country: United States
- Language: English

The Last of the Mohicans is a 1936 American historical Western adventure film directed by George B. Seitz and starring Randolph Scott, Binnie Barnes and Henry Wilcoxon. The screenplay by Philip Dunne was based on the 1826 novel of the same name by James Fenimore Cooper. It was produced by Edward Small and distributed by United Artists.

== Plot ==
During the French and Indian War, Alice and Cora, the two daughters of Colonel Munro, set out from Albany to join their father at his wilderness fort. They are escorted by Major Duncan Heyward, who has loved Alice for a long time, and the Huron Indian scout Magua. Magua, a vicious drunkard, is secretly plotting to murder the colonel and his children. He lures Major Heyward and the girls into an ambush, but they are saved by Natty Bumppo, a white frontiersmen known as "Hawkeye" for his skill with a musket, and the last two surviving members of the Mohican tribe, Chingachgook and his son Uncas. On their way to the fort, Uncas falls in love with Cora, while Hawkeye and Alice are attracted to each other.

The fort is besieged by the French, under General Montcalm, and their Indian allies. Hawkeye sneaks out at night and overhears Magua persuading the Indians to attack the local colonial settlements while they are unprotected. Colonel Munro refuses to accept Hawkeye's unsupported word and forbids the colonial militia under his command to leave. Hawkeye arranges for the men to depart, but remains behind. The colonel has no choice but to sentence him to death for insubordination. Magua incites his followers to attack the fort and prevent an agreement between Montcalm and Munro that would allow the British to surrender the fort peacefully in exchange for their lives. Before Montcalm can stop the fighting, Colonel Munro is fatally wounded, and his daughters are carried off by Magua's war party. Magua tells the women that Cora will become his squaw, and Alice will be burned alive.

Hawkeye and his friends break out of the stockade and set out in pursuit, as does Heyward. When they reach a stream, they are forced to split up. Hawkeye and Chingachgook search downstream, Heyward and Uncas upstream. Uncas picks up the trail, and unwilling to wait for the others, hurries ahead by himself. He manages to free Cora, but they are trapped on top of a cliff. Uncas kills one man, but Magua sends him plummeting to the bottom of the cliff. Rather than become Magua's woman, Cora jumps to her death. The dying Uncas drags himself over to her lifeless body and takes her hand in his before succumbing. Chingachgook arrives and challenges Magua to fight one-on-one. Hawkeye prevents Heyward from interfering; Chingachgook drowns Magua in the river.

Meanwhile, Alice is taken to a large Indian settlement to be burned at the stake. Hawkeye sends Chingachgook to stand guard, then tells Heyward he will offer himself in exchange for Alice. Heyward offers his life, instead, but Hawkeye tells him that the Indians would not trade Alice for a British officer they do not know. It must be an enemy warrior they respect highly. Heyward knocks Hawkeye out and takes his clothes, because the enemy does not know what Hawkeye looks like. Heyward enters the armed camp and bargains for Alice's release. Hawkeye awakens and follows him. Faced with two men claiming to be Hawkeye, the enemy chief decides the winner of a shooting contest must be the real one, and he is proved right. Before she leaves, Alice kisses Hawkeye. Then, he is tied to a stake and the wood around him set on fire. Alice and the others encounter a British relief force led by General Abercrombie. They storm the camp and free Hawkeye.

Hawkeye faces a court-martial, but Heyward has the charges dismissed. Hawkeye enlists in the British Army and sets out with them to attack French Canada. Alice tells him she will be waiting for him at Albany.

== Cast ==
- Randolph Scott as Hawkeye
- Binnie Barnes as Alice Munro
- Henry Wilcoxon as Major Heyward
- Bruce Cabot as Magua
- Heather Angel as Cora Munro
- Phillip Reed as Uncas
- Robert Barrat as Chingachgook
- Hugh Buckler as Colonel Munro
- Willard Robertson as Captain Winthrop
- William Stack as General Montcalm
- Lumsden Hare as General Abercrombie
- Frank McGlynn Sr. as Gamut
- Will Stanton as Jenkins
- William V. Mong as Sacham
- Art Dupuis as De Levis
- Ian MacLaren as William Pitt
- Reginald Barlow as Duke of Newcastle
- Olaf Hytten as King George II
- Lionel Belmore as Patroon
- Claude King as Duke of Marlborough
- Harry Cording as Trapper (uncredited)
- Ethan Laidlaw as Colonialist (uncredited)

== Production ==
The movie was the last of several that producer Edward Small's Reliance Picture Corporation made for United Artists. Merle Oberon was originally announced as the female lead. Plans were set to make the movie in color, but Small decided it was too expensive.

Philip Dunne worked on the script with John L. Balderston. Dunne later claimed that the final film:

Is only a pallid ghost of what John and I originally wrote. Ours was a full-blooded screenplay, combining adventure and excitement with what we considered some respectable poetry in the love story between the patrician English girl and the young Mohican brave. Above all, we painted an authentic picture of colonial American in the 18th century.

Dunne said that production of the film was postponed due to casting problems; Balderstone and he went away, and by the time they came back, shooting had started.

The film was appalling. In our absence, Eddie apparently had succumbed to the itch many producers have to tamper with inactive scripts. I don't know what writers he had hired, but they had succeeded in turning our authentic 18th-century period piece into a third-rate Western. The characters even spoke to each other in 20th-century colloquialisms, and each had been rendered banal beyond belief.

Small then hired Dunne to rewrite the dialogue on set, although he says the structure of his original script remained altered.

=== Filming locations in California ===
- Big Bear Lake, Big Bear Valley, San Bernardino National Forest
- Cedar Lake, Big Bear Valley, San Bernardino National Forest
- Smith River, near the community of Hiouchi, Del Norte County
- Iverson Ranch, 1 Iverson Lane, Chatsworth, Los Angeles
- Kern River, Bakersfield
- Lake Earl, near Crescent City, Del Norte County
- Lake Sherwood
- RKO-Pathé Studios – 9336 Washington Blvd., Culver City (studio)
- San Bernardino National Forest

== Reception ==
In his review for AllMovie, Paul Brenner wrote that Randolph Scott had "one of his best roles as Hawk-eye in this exciting film adaptation of James Fenimore Cooper's often filmed novel."

Clem Beauchamp was nominated for the Academy Award for Best Assistant Director.

=== Influence on future adaptations ===
The film served as the basis for a subsequent 1992 adaptation written and directed by Michael Mann and starring Daniel Day-Lewis as Hawkeye, Madeleine Stowe as Cora, Wes Studi as Magua, Russell Means as Chingachgook, and Steven Waddington as Duncan. Writers John L. Balderston, Daniel Moore, and Paul Perez were given a "Story by" credit on the film, which carries over several changes made in the 1936 film. These include Hawkeye's characterization as a romantic lead who develops a relationship with Cora after she rejects the proposal of Duncan.
