= The Wing-and-Wing =

1842 novel by James Fenimore Cooper

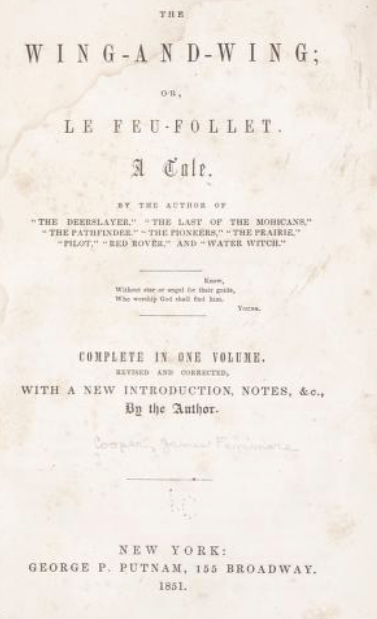
- Title page for The Wing-and-Wing; Or, Le Feu-Follet (1851)
- Author: James Fenimore Cooper
- Original title: The Wing-and-Wing; Or, Le Feu-Follet
- Language: English
- Genre: Nautical fiction
- Published: 1842
- Preceded by: The Two Admirals
- Followed by: Wyandotté; or, The Hutted Knoll. A Tale

The Wing-and-Wing; Or, Le Feu-Follet is an 1842, sea novel by the American author James Fenimore Cooper. It includes a thematic interest in religiosity and faith. The novel also introduces metacriticism into Cooper's sea fiction, as does The Sea Lions, unlike earlier novels which typically also focused on nautical and nationalist themes.
