= The Monikins =

1835 novel by James Fenimore Cooper

The Monikins is an 1835 novel, written by James Fenimore Cooper. The novel, a beast fable, was written between his composition of two of his more famous novels from the Leatherstocking Tales, The Prairie and The Pathfinder. The critic Christina Starobin compares the novel's plot to Jonathan Swift's Gulliver's Travels. The novel is a satire, narrated by the main character, the English Sir John Goldencalf. Goldencalf and the American captain Noah Poke travel on a series of humorous adventures to an Antarctic archipelago inhabited by a race of civilized monkeys.

The novel is not very popular with Cooper's readers. A contemporary critic of the novel in The Knickerbocker described it with great disappointment.
