= The American Democrat =

Book by James Fenimore Cooper

The American Democrat: Or, Hints on the Social and Civic Relations of the United States of America
- 1956 edition (publ. Vintage Books)
- Author: James Fenimore Cooper
- Cover artist: Paul Rand (see image)
- Genre: Political essay
- Publisher: H. & E. Phinney
- Publication date: 1838
- Pages: 192
- OCLC: 838066322

The American Democrat: Or, Hints on the Social and Civic Relations of the United States of America, a political essay written by American republican author James Fenimore Cooper, was published initially in New York State in 1838. Originally intended as a textbook on the American republican democracy, the work analyzes the social forces that shape, and can ultimately corrupt such a system.

It served as an indictment of public opinion, which he argued had the potential to corrupt public morals and democracy. Because The American Democrat did not intrigue the public like a novel would have, it was neither purchased in the United States nor published in Europe. The essay, however, provided the intellectual framework and concepts for two later works of fiction: Homeward Bound: or The Chase: A Tale of the Sea and Home as Found: Sequel to Homeward Bound. Unlike his previous work where he set out to create American literature, this essay is credited with helping Cooper to establish a new identity as a writer as one who exposed the vices in society.

== Inspiration and context ==
=== Personal ===
The American Democrat arose out of three major events in Cooper's life. The first was his experience abroad. Cooper had lived in Europe – mainly in Paris– between 1826 and 1833. This experience, according to Cooper, helped him become "a foreigner in his own country," allowing him to "present to the reader those opinions that are suited to the actual condition of the country, [rather] than to dwell on principles more general."

The American Democrat also arose out of the Three Mile Point dispute, which ended on July 22, 1837. This controversy began when the people of his hometown, Cooperstown, trespassed onto his property, using it as a picnic ground. After Cooper's publication of a notice about trespassing on his land, the citizens and the press of Cooperstown organized a protest against him. Attacks by the Whig newspapers continued even after Cooper had proved his ownership of that piece of property. This occurrence led Cooper to write about the role of property rights in America, "giv[ing] universal meaning" to the dispute.

The final event in Cooper's life that influenced his message in The American Democrat was his experience with libel lawsuits. His struggles with the Whig press, who had published libelous statements about him, escalated between 1837 and 1838.

=== Ideological and social context ===
In Cooper's mind, the divine, moral, natural, and civil laws were intertwined. Influenced by John Locke and Alexander Pope, he believed that natural law was "the will of God's providence operating in nature according to observable principles," such as property rights, deism, and biblical truth. These views were further influenced by the philosophies of Thomas Jefferson, John Adams, and James Madison. Their ideas led him to believe that is necessary to protect the entire country from man's inherently self-serving nature.

The political situation in the late 1830s made Cooper feel as though the true nature of civil law and government was being disregarded. Hence, by 1838, "the troubles created by legislative usurpation, demagoguery, rotation in office, and leveling to mediocrity had, in Cooper's view, reached such a point that he longed to curb the exercise of individual liberty that he equally longed to maintain."

== Argument and themes of The American Democrat ==
=== Government and the Constitution ===
Cooper argues that the principles of natural justice should be the basis of all governments. Within a democracy, he also claims an increasing need to protect these principles because they are susceptible to the natural selfishness of those in power. In a representative, constitutional republic, like the United States, the United States Constitution acts as a social contract between the states and their leaders. This distinction raises the question of the role of the states, which Cooper believes are sovereign in their own way because they consent to their union under a federal government.

In that sense, political power in the U.S. is a trust granted by the constituent to the representative in deliberate institutions, checking and balancing each other. Therefore, it is imperative for representatives to work within the limits of their respective branches of government. In his view, the American government is at its best when those in power strictly adhere to the system put in place by the Constitution. Thus, in theory, the Constitution provides the necessary restraints on power so that men cannot pursue their own interests.

Along those lines, Cooper proposes that a representative must actually devote himself to the community, representing both the majority and the minority to ensure that the government is for and of the people.

One advantage of this representative democracy is the "general elevation in the character of the people" through equal opportunity. Additionally, with democracy's promotion of "juster [sic] notions of all moral truths ... society is ... a gainer in the greatest element of happiness." Democracy also leads to an increased political stability "because the people [have] legal means in their power to redress wrongs."

=== Equality, liberty, and individuality ===
Cooper claims that a democracy provides its citizens, who are naturally unequal physically and morally, with equal civil and political rights. These types of rights, however, are not absolute as women, children, and slaves are excluded. Without natural inequality resulting from property rights and inheritance, without which "civilization would become stationary, or, it would recede; the incentives of individuality and of the affections, being absolutely necessary to impel men to endure the labor and privations that alone can advance it." Thus, ultimately "individuality is the aim of political liberty."

To Cooper, liberty was defined as "such a state of the social compact as permits the members of a community to lay no more restraints on themselves, than are required by their real necessities, and obvious interests ... it is a requisite of liberty that the body of a nation should retain the power to modify its institutions, as circumstances shall require." This concept reflects the idea of negative liberty.

=== Duty of the American Democrat ===
It is the role of the citizen to responsibly exercise his God-given right to self-government. Every citizen must also obey the laws and guard the rights of his fellow man. To Cooper, such a human contract and moral obligation is a Divine Truth. Also, the American democrat must keep his representatives in check, constantly questioning their motives and objectively judging policy initiatives in comparison with the constitution, not their own values, prejudices, or opinions. In fact, "the elector who gives his vote, on any grounds, party or personal, to an unworthy candidate, violates a sacred publick duty, and is unfit to be a freeman."

Additionally, the democrat is "one who is willing to admit of a free competition, in all things ... he is the purest democrat who best maintains his right, and no rights can be dearer to a man of cultivation, than exemptions from unseasonable invasions on his time, by the coarse-minded and ignorant." He was concerned when it came to democracy. He valued personal liberty.

=== The dangers of democracy ===
In his view, the aim of a good government is "to add no unnecessary and artificial aid to the force of its own unavoidable consequences, and to abstain from fortifying and accumulating social inequality as a means of increasing political inequalities." Thus, a good democracy should ensure political and civil equality to all, keeping the members of higher classes from getting more than is constitutionally owed to them. At the time, Cooper argued that there were three factors endangering democracy – public opinion, demagoguery, and the press. He believed that the corruption of these things made political liberty, equality, rights, and justice more abstract notions rather than true pillars of society.

==== Public opinion ====
In democracies, "the tyranny of majorities is a greater evil than the oppression of minorities in narrow systems." In that vein, public opinion could become law, making the system liable to "popular impulses" and prejudice. The political party system increases the likelihood of this situation because "when a party rules, the people do not rule, but merely such a portion of the people as can manage to get control of the party".

Cooper claims that

whenever the government of the United States shall break up, it will probably be in consequence of a false direction having been given to publick [sic] opinion. This is the weak point of our defenses, and the part to which the enemies of the system will direct all their attacks. Opinion can be so perverted as to cause the false to seem true; the enemy, a friend, and the friend, an enemy; the best interests of the nation to appear insignificant and trifle of moment; in a word, the right the wrong and the wrong the right.

Public opinion is the gateway to the other potential destroyers of democracy – the press and the demagogue – because it can be taken advantage of if the public is not critical.

In the end, he argues,

the habit of seeing the publick [sic] rule, is gradually accustoming the American mind to an interference with private rights that is slowly undermining the individuality of the national character. There is getting to be so much publick [sic] right, that private right is overshadowed and lost. A danger exists that the ends of liberty [individuality] will be forgotten altogether in the means.

==== The demagogue ====
In the U.S., Cooper argues that the most dangerous abuse of the government is taking advantage of the citizens to gain or maintain authority. Consequently, Cooper disparages the demagogue and political manager who pursue their own interest "by affecting a deep devotion to the interests of the people" and by "put[ting] the people before the constitution and the laws in face of the obvious truth that people have paced the laws before themselves."

==== The press ====
While Cooper acknowledged that without a free press there could be no popular liberty in the nation, he also believed that the press was easily corruptible and able to spread inaccurate information at any time. In that sense, "licentiousness, neither publick [sic] honesty, justice, nor a proper regard for character" also infringed upon private liberty. Consequently, it was necessary to hold the press accountable for the information it disseminated.

The current state of the U.S. media was that the press had become an instrument for "the schemes of interested political adventurers." It had evolved from a tool for the free flow of constructive ideas to one of the free flow of false information. The following passage illustrates this perception:

In America, while the contest was for great principles, the press aided in elevating the common character, in improving the common mind, and in maintaining the common interests; but, since the contest has ceased and the struggle has become one purely of selfishness and personal interests, it is employed as a whole, in fast undermining its own work, and in preparing the nation for some terrible reverses, if not in calling down upon it, a just judgment of God. As the press now exists, it would seem to be expressly devised by the great agent of mischief, to depress and destroy all that is good, and to elevate and advance all that is evil in the nation.

Cooper argued that the effects of this free but corrupted press render "men indifferent to character, and, indeed, render[s] character itself of little avail, besides setting up an irresponsible and unprincipled power that is stronger than the government itself."

== Critique and reception of The American Democrat ==
Around the time of its publication, critics claimed that the book was not at all interesting. Though his arguments were clear and well defended, some thought his writing suffered from "a lofty patriotism" that ended up destroying the value of his argument with "the one-sidedness of view and tendency to over-statement into which his ardor of feeling ... habitually hurried him." Such individuals then argued that in writing The American Democrat, Cooper "was not aiming at popularity; it might not be much out of the way to say that he was aiming at unpopularity."

More contemporary critics, such as Robert E. Long and James Grossman, have argued that The American Democrat represents a complete change in how Cooper approached the American system. In earlier writings, he seemed to write optimistically of the nation's expansive energies. With the publication of The American Democrat and the following works it inspired, he seemed to muse upon the dangers of the system and its downfall. Starting with this work, Cooper's message on America became ominous as he continued to argue that although "political liberty is greater [in the U.S.] than in nearly every other civilized nation, [it is the country] in which men have the least individuality and personal liberty." However, some have argued that in The American Democrat, he never quite unites the dilemma concerning the rising class society, which "politically ... threatens majority rule, because a minority of wealth and talent can always subvert democratic institutions ... [but] socially ... assures 'the utmost practicable personal liberty' by recognizing the right of association of men of like interests and tastes."

Still, others have argued that The American Democrat could have been more influential had it not been overshadowed by Alexis de Tocqueville's Democracy in America, whose first volume had been published internationally in 1835. Critics, such as Stephen Railton, argue that the two political essays approach the same types of subjects and reach very similar conclusions. In fact, both argue that "just because a republic is free from a monarchal ruler does not mean it is free from tyrannical rule," hinting at the notion of tyranny of the majority and the hegemony of public opinion. What kept The American Democrat from being considered part of the discussion in American political theory was that it was "the product of [Cooper's] spleen," coming out of a more biased observation because of the conflicts in which he had been involved. Other critics, such as Wayne Franklin, further this point in claiming that what compelled Cooper to write about the state of the nation was that when he came back from Europe in 1833, he had become "widely discredited as the spokesman for America he had tried to be." In light of the events that personally clouded his view of the country, Cooper then took "a fugitive stance vis-à-vis the public – his public, as he might have asserted a short time earlier." Hence, his alienation, masked by his claim to have been looking at the U.S. with the eyes of a foreigner, colored his discussion of the country.

With these factors in mind, it has been argued that "the work cannot be viewed as it often has been, as Cooper's definitive statement of his political feelings." Ultimately, though, at least one critic has argued that his musings on the state of the nation, "show us ... the true democrat is he who wishes to conserve the republic. In this sense, and in this sense only, can we define Cooper's American as a conservative democrat." Another author writes that Cooper expressed sympathy with "liberal opinions" which he defined as the "generous, manly determination to let all enjoy equal political rights, and to bring those to whom authority is necessarily confided under the control of the community they serve" but rejected the "devices of demagogues" who teach that "the voice of the people is the voice of God."
