= Feu follet (disambiguation) =

The Feu follet or Fifollet is a legendary spirit in French and Louisiana Creole folklore, similar to the Will-o'-the-wisp.

Feu follet, Feufollet or Feu-follet may also refer to:

- Feufollet, an American band
- The Fire Within (Le feu follet), a 1963 film
- The Wing-and-Wing (Le feu-follet), an 1842 novel
- Transcendental Étude No. 5 (Liszt) (Feux follets)
