= Seventy-Six (novel) =

1823 historical fiction novel by John Neal

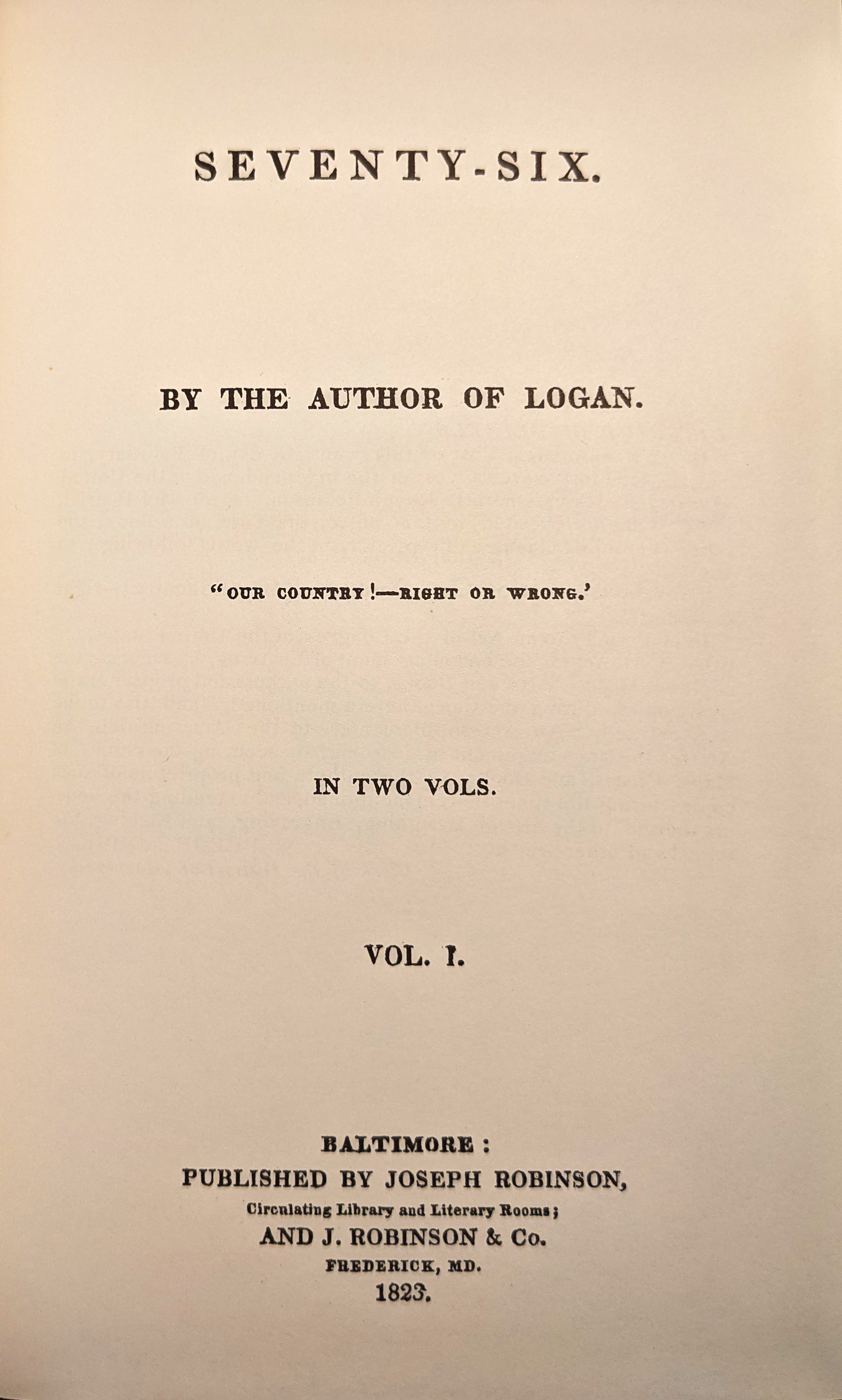
- Title page of the first edition, volume 1
- Author: John Neal
- Language: English
- Genre: Historical fiction
- Set in: American Revolutionary War
- Publisher: Joseph Robinson
- Publication date: 1823
- Publication place: United States
- Pages: 528 (first edition)
- OCLC: 12207391
- Text: Seventy-Six at Wikisource

Seventy-Six is a historical fiction novel by American writer John Neal. Published in Baltimore in 1823, it is the fourth novel written about the American Revolutionary War. Historically distinguished for its pioneering use of colloquial language, Yankee dialect, battle scene realism, high characterization, stream of consciousness narrative, profanity, and depictions of sex and romance, the novel foreshadowed and influenced later American writers. The narrative prose resembles spoken American English more than any other literature of its period. It was the first work of American fiction to use the phrase son-of-a-bitch.

The story is told by Continental Army soldier Jonathan Oadley and follows multiple love stories interweaving with battle scenes and the overall progress of the war. It explores male pain and self-loathing resulting from violent acts committed in war and duels. A response to James Fenimore Cooper's The Spy (1821) and inspired by Neal's own work on A History of the American Revolution (1819), the novel was written over twenty-seven days in early 1822. It was generally well received at publication, and increased Neal's nationwide fame to rival that of Cooper's. It is considered by some scholars as well as the author himself to be his best novel, though consensus among scholars is that the book is more of a failure in construction than it is a success in style. It was largely forgotten by the 20th century.

== Plot ==
The book is written in first-person perspective by narrator Jonathan Oadley as an old man remembering the American Revolutionary War. It opens with an expression of urgency he feels in recording his memories for posterity: "Yes, my children, I will no longer delay it." His story begins in New Jersey in the early winter of 1776, with residents fearing British and Hessian raiding parties following George Washington's retreat through the area. Twenty-two-year-old Jonathan and his twenty-year-old brother Archibald decide to join the Continental Army, along with their sixty-year-old father Jonathan senior, cousin Arthur Rodman, and neighbor Robert Arnauld. Arnauld's daughters Clara and Lucia become the brothers' love interests.

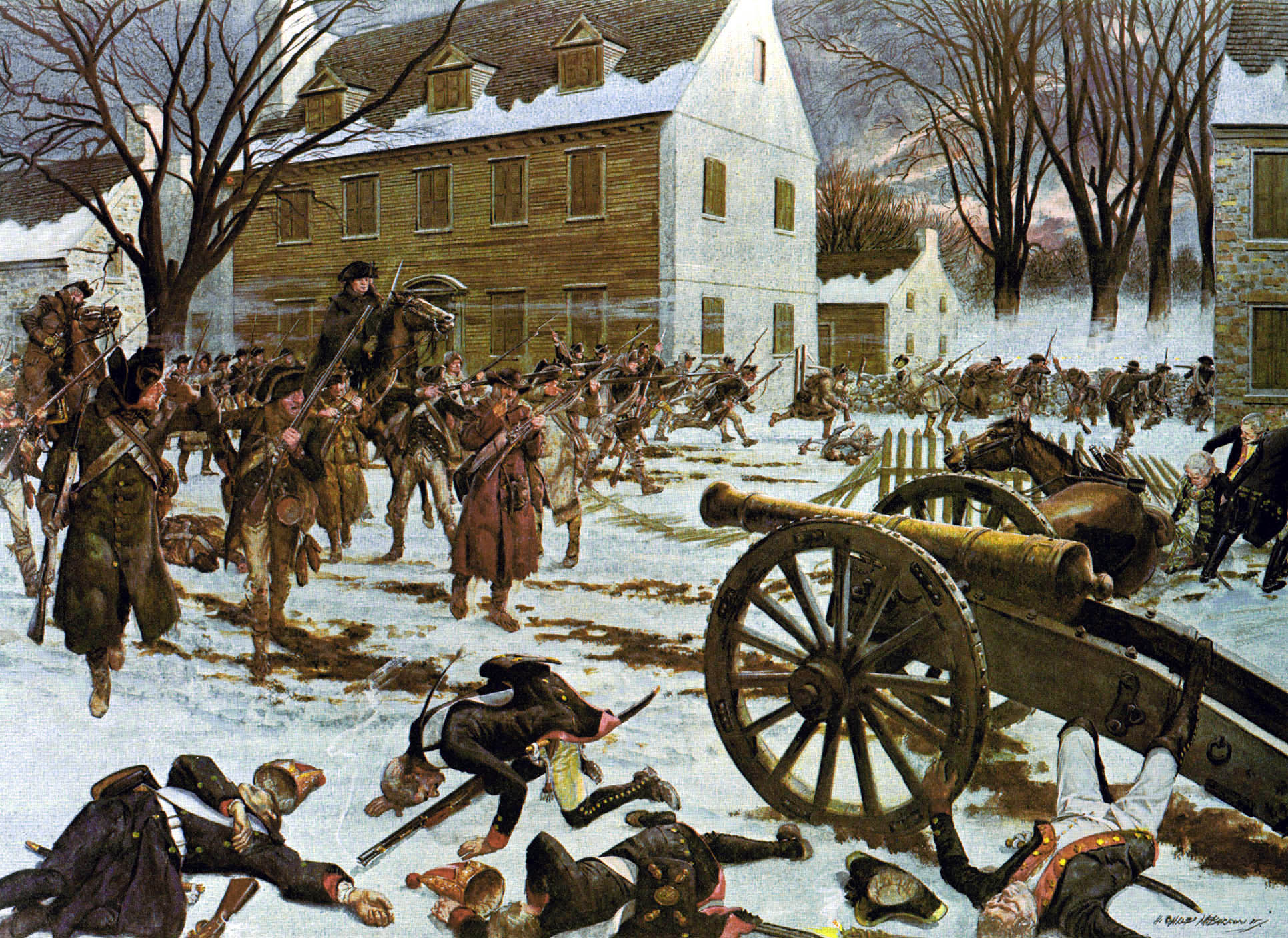
Battle of Trenton by H. Charles McBarron Jr.

While the Oadley brothers recruit soldiers from the area, Colonel George R. Clinton arrives to train the new cavalry unit. Clinton vaguely brags of his connections to Washington, befriends Archibald, and awards him with a commission as captain. While the brothers are in training, the Oadley home is burned by Hessians, who wound the elder Jonathan and kidnap Arthur's love interest, Mary Austin. The characters all assume her to be killed. Soon after, the Oadleys stumble into their first battle, in which Archibald is wounded. He recovers in time for the three to fight in the Battle of Trenton, in which the elder Jonathan is killed.

While Jonathan, Archibald, Arthur, and Clinton participate in the New York and New Jersey campaign, multiple romantic stories unfold. Lucia courts and is courted by both Clinton and Archibald. Jonathan and Clara become romantically involved but Jonathan engages in a brief fling with her younger and more flirtatious cousin, Ellen Sampson. Mary Austin reappears and is reunited with Arthur in Philadelphia, but expresses romantic interest in the older Robert, whom Jonathan calls "a profligate—a voluptuary—a sensualist, perhaps". Archibald and Clinton compete for Lucia's affection, which leads to Archibald killing Clinton in a sword duel. Volume I ends with Archibald being arrested for the duel by military police.

Volume II opens with Washington pardoning Archibald for killing Clinton. The Oadleys get to know a Northern officer, Chester Copely, who is hated by the Virginia troops and kills a Major Ellis of Virginia in a pistol duel. Copely, Jonathan, Archibald, and Arthur participate in the Battle of Brandywine, Battle of Germantown, winter at Valley Forge, and Battle of Monmouth, at which Jonathan is wounded, loses a leg, and is sent home. Jonathan marries Clara, Copely marries Ellen, and Arthur marries Mary in a joint ceremony, but the story becomes focused on the courtship between Archibald and Lucia. With the narrator removed from the battlefield, news of the war continues to come from letters and visits from Archibald and Arthur, who are now serving in the Southern theater.

Archibald becomes disillusioned with war, contracts tuberculosis, and returns home. Jonathan and Clara then become occupied with convincing Archibald and Lucia to marry each other; they are both reluctant because of their own seemingly fatal illnesses. In the final chapter, Archibald confesses to Jonathan that he considers himself a murderer because of a neighbor he killed in a duel before the war. Archibald and Lucia finally consent to marriage and the ceremony concludes the story:

[Archibald] stood suddenly erect upon his feet; the light flashed over his face. It was the face of a dead man. He fell upon the floor: a loud shriek followed. Where were we? Where! We ran to him—we raised him up. It was too late! Almighty God! it was too late! HIS WIFE WAS A WIDOW.

== Themes ==
When writing Seventy-Six, Neal rejected the historical fiction convention of using narrative to impose coherent meaning upon human experience. The narrative style shifts markedly between battle scenes and discussions of the overarching course of the war to reinforce the separation between lived experience and the process of making meaning from those experiences by analyzing a course of events. The resulting disorderliness is so pervasive, it is one of the novel's key themes, being self-referenced throughout the book from the preface through multiple chapters. Neal's intention was to achieve a vivacious representation of lived action that a coherent theme and plot would in his view inhibit. "The reader becomes an eye-witness in spite of himself", he said in a self-review.

The novel also explores pain and self-loathing resulting from men killing one another in warfare and duels. Like Neal's novels Randolph and Errata (both published the same year), the hero of Seventy-Six successfully kills another in a duel and suffers the rest of his life in consequence. Neal portrays dueling as emasculating, rather than as an expression of masculinity. Archibald is haunted by violent nightmares, preternatural phenomena, and other Gothic story elements that he interprets as coming from his dueling victim, Clinton. Debates in Congress in the early 1820s about Revolutionary War soldier pensions exposed conflicts between official histories of the revolution and painful oral histories from veterans. Neal may have intended the novel's subtitle, "Our Country!—Right or Wrong", to be a timely criticism of what he believed the country had done wrong at that time.

Alongside the novel's war plot is a love story intertwining multiple characters. Here, Seventy-Six stands in contrast to its contemporaries by depicting romantic and sexual relationships more realistically. Both male and female characters are portrayed as actively feeling sexual attraction and seeking love, whereas American fiction from the period more predominantly depicted female characters as romantically passive. In this way, the relationship between Archibald and Lucia may have influenced the relationship between Arthur Dimmesdale and Hester Prynne in Nathaniel Hawthorne's The Scarlet Letter.

== Style ==
"It was there," said he, "there exactly where that horse is passing now, that they first fired upon me. I set off at speed up that hill, but, finding nine of the party there, I determined to dash over that elevation in front—I attempted it, but, shot after shot, was fired after me, until I preferred making one desperate attempt, sword in hand, to being shot down, like a fat goose, upon a broken gallop. I wheeled, made a dead set, at the son-of-a-bitch in my rear, unhorsed him, and actually broke through the line."

— Battle scene excerpt employing colloquialism and profanity

The narrative style of Seventy-Six is noteworthy for its pioneering transcriptions of Yankee dialect and experiments with colloquial language. Neal used contractions, stichomythic dialogue, short repetitive sentences, and long passionate sentences marked by the free use of dashes. He also used colloquial phrases like fight up, keep out of the way awhile, and put you out of the way. His use of profanity was heavy for the time and included phrases like damn it, what the devil, and the first use of son-of-a-bitch in American fiction. As narrator, Jonathan Oadley states, "My style may often offend you. I do not doubt that it will. I hope that it will. It will be remembered the better."

The narrator refers to his writing style as "talking on paper" and describes it as "the style of a soldier, plain and direct". It reads closer to spoken American English than that of any other author at the time. For Neal, narrowing the gap between spoken and written language was essential to developing a new and distinctly American style of writing. This style choice had little precedent and little following its footsteps until the works of Ralph Waldo Emerson and Walt Whitman starting in the 1840s, and Mark Twain starting in the 1870s, all of which are foreshadowed by Seventy-Six. Neal made similar experiments in his novels Randolph and Errata (written earlier but published later the same year), but they were less fully integrated into the novel.

Battle scenes in the novel are told using long sentences of multiple qualifiers to express the narrator's anxiety in a pioneering use of what would be called stream of consciousness a century later. The narrator describes it as "a fair chart of the rambling incoherent journeying of my thought for hours". The level of verisimilitude of these battle scenes foreshadows the work of Edgar Allan Poe years later. The way the reader's perspective is heavily distorted by the conditions of battle and soldiers' conflicting emotions are expressed were not replicated until The Red Badge of Courage by Stephen Crane in 1895.

Scholars of literature consider Seventy-Six significant for its level of characterization, achieved in part by exploring the psychology of those characters. The novel is unique in its time for its emphasis on characters' feelings over their actions. Neal gave even the story's incidental characters a greater level of individualization than is typical for the period.

== Background ==
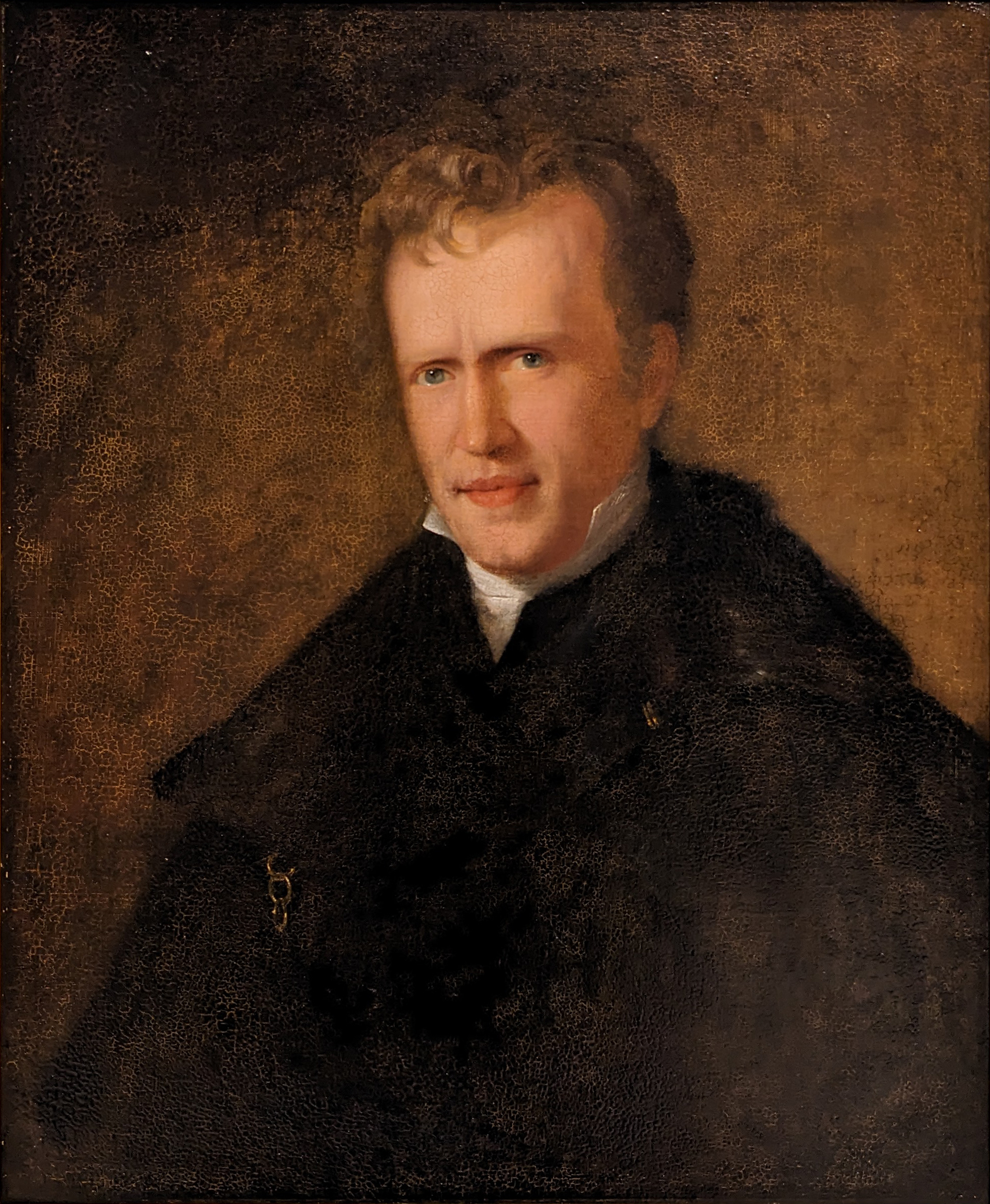
John Neal in 1823

Seventy-Six is a response to James Fenimore Cooper's first popular novel, The Spy, which was published in late 1821. Neal praised it as "exceedingly attractive" and "a capital novel", but dismissed its style as "without peculiarity—brilliancy, or force" and its plot as "rather too full of stage-tricks and clap-traps". He determined to outdo the fellow novelist.

Neal was already inspired by research and writing he had done years earlier. In 1818, Neal worked with fellow Delphian Club cofounder Tobias Watkins to write A History of the American Revolution (published 1819) based on primary sources collected by another Delphian, Paul Allen. Decades later he described the experience of inspiration:

I had got charged to the muzzle with the doings of our Revolutionary fathers, while writing my portion of "Allen's History," and wanted only the hint, or touch, that Cooper gave in passing, to go off like a Leyden jar, and empty myself at once of all the hoarded enthusiasm I had been bottling up, for three or four years.

Similarities between A History of the American Revolution and Seventy-Six indicate that Neal adapted passages from his earlier work into the novel. According to Neal, he wrote the 528-page novel with "marvellous rapidity" over twenty-seven days between February 16 and March 19, 1822. The pace was so rigorous, he said, that "I tumbled out of my chair" because "I had fainted, – swooned, – from overwork." He had already completed first draft manuscripts of Randolph and Errata, though those two novels were not published until later in 1823. Neal considered his 1822–1823 novels "a complete series; a course of experiment" in declamation (Logan), narrative (Seventy-Six), epistolary (Randolph), and colloquialism (Errata). He wrote all four between October 1821 and March 1822.

== Publication history ==
Seventy-Six was published by Joseph Robinson of Baltimore in the first quarter of 1823 and pirated the following May by Whittaker and Company of London. Neal decided to publish anonymously and attributed authorship on the title page to "the author of Logan", referring to the novel he had also published anonymously the year before. Three historical novels about the American Revolution predate Seventy-Six: The Female Review by Herman Mann (1797), The Champions of Freedom by Daniel Woodworth (1816), and The Spy by Cooper (1821). J. Cunningham in London republished it in 1840 as Seventy-Six; or, Love and Battle. The original Baltimore edition was republished by facsimile in 1971.

Playwright Harry Watkins, at the suggestion of writer Cornelius Mathews, asked Neal in 1875 about drafting a play based on Seventy-Six to coincide with the 1876 US centennial. Watkins eventually abandoned the project, but Neal became intent on having the novel republished for the same reason Watkins thought to write an adaptation. He recruited longtime friend Henry Wadsworth Longfellow, but neither man could convince publisher James R. Osgood to finance republication. Neal died in June 1876 without succeeding.

== Reception ==
=== Period critique ===
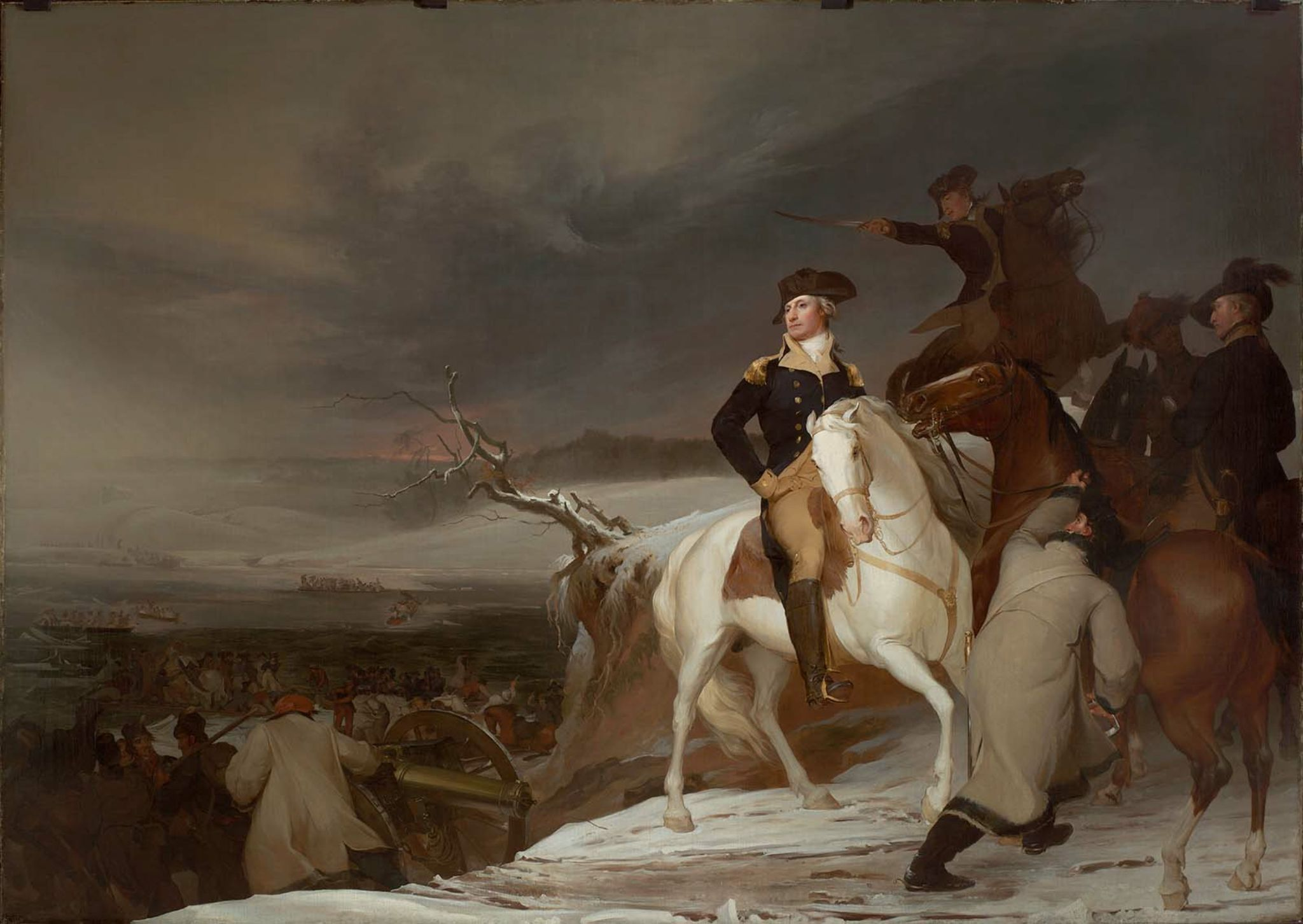
The Passage of the Delaware

Despite anonymous publication, authorship of Seventy-Six was quickly attributed to Neal by many critics. The book enjoyed a generally favorable reception in the US and UK that fashioned Neal as Cooper's chief rival for recognition as America's leading novelist. The Literary Gazette praised the "most vivid sketches" of battles and "full of faults, but still full of power". The Monthly Review similarly felt "his battle pieces plunge us into the midst of them", with the story on the whole being "very far from trifling and ordinary". The Literary Chronicle and Weekly Review considered the work something "which no lover of fiction should omit to read".

Philadelphia journalist Stephen Simpson called the book "a grand and magnificent monument of liberty and our country". Another Philadelphia reviewer called it "a lively and boldly sketched picture of the sufferings of our country during the struggle for Independence". Journalist Joseph T. Buckingham compared it favorably to viewing The Passage of the Delaware (1819) by painter Thomas Sully. Near the end of his life, Neal believed Seventy-Six to be his best novel, calling it "a spirited sketch of the Revolutionary war, full of incident, character, and truthfulness". Decades earlier, he admitted to the book's extravagancies, saying in American Writers (1824–25) that it is "so outrageously overdone, that no-body can read it through."

The novel's most severe review was published in The Port Folio by John Elihu Hall, whom Neal had attacked in another publication four years earlier. Focusing on the novel's sexual content, he asked: "What shall we say of the polluted mind which conceived this loathsome picture of depravity? How can the writer imagine that any decent person will allow a book to remain in his library which abounds, as these volumes do, in gross and needless violations of decorum?" A negative review in The Monthly Magazine focused on the novel's depictions of violence, calling it "rude and boisterous; every chapter being covered with blood, or heaving with the throes of lacerated flesh." Of the profanities used in the novel: "In addition to the regularly-formed oaths, which are very numerous, the name of God is invoked in every page: and in such a manner as to make it difficult to discover whether the author meant to pray or to swear." The Magazine of Foreign Literature bemoaned: "If the author would only condescend to write intelligibly ... he would yet ... become eminent as a novelist", but allowed that "yet, with all this, there is so much talent, so much of surprisingly amusing madness, that we cannot blame it as we ought."

=== Modern views ===
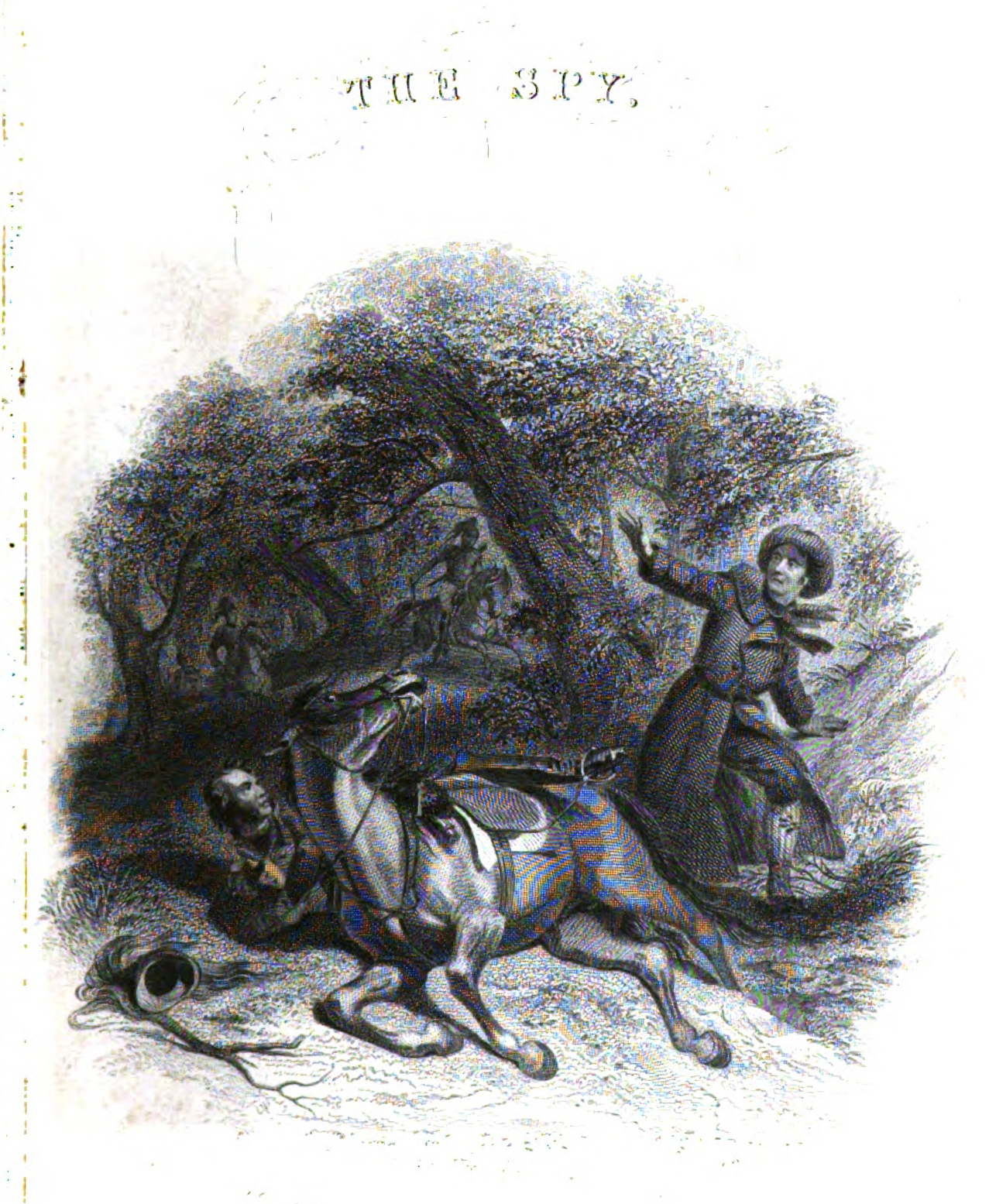
The Spy frontispiece

Copies of Seventy-Six had become rare as early as 1876 and the book was largely forgotten by the 20th and 21st centuries. The scholarship that exists largely praises the book's powerful and groundbreaking moments, but bemoans that those strengths are outweighed by the plot's incoherence and disjointedness. The preface by scholar Robert Bain to the novel's 1971 edition uplifts the story's groundbreaking elements, but blames its construction and overly sensational tangents for reducing its readability. This consensus view reflects an 1849 essay by Edgar Allan Poe, who felt that "the repeated failures of John Neal as regards the construction" of his books puts readers "in no mood to give the author credit for the vivid sensations which have been aroused during the progress of perusal". Scholar Donald A. Ringe opined: "What Neal failed to realize was that a work of historical fiction had to do more than merely present a few realistic accounts of actual battles, that both the historical and the nonhistorical parts had to be integrated in such a way as to reveal the meaning and significance of the entire action." While accepting the validity of this consensus assessment, literature scholar Jeffrey Insko argued the book is nevertheless interesting "not despite, but precisely because of [its] incoherencies", which is "itself the meaning of [Neal's] fiction".

Scholars Alexander Cowie, Benjamin Lease, Irving T. Richards, and Donald A. Sears claimed Neal's novel to be better than Cooper's rival novel The Spy and other relevant romances of its period, particularly in style, power, and verisimilitude. Sears, Cowie, and Richards held Seventy-Six to be Neal's best novel for its more powerful moments that ought to appeal still to 20th-century readers. Unlike later scholars, Richards in 1933 ruled "the objectionable features are in this novel subordinate and almost insignificant." He described the plot as well-constructed and second only to characterization as the novel's best trait. He concluded, "Seventy-Six is a novel that well deserves to be resuscitated, and that makes one a bit exasperated with the public perversity that throws such work by the wayside and cherishes for a name the early, relatively inferior Spy of Cooper."
