= Precaution =

1820 novel by James Fenimore Cooper

- Covers of the first edition (US)
- Author: James Fenimore Cooper
- Language: English
- Genre: Novel
- Publisher: A. T. Goodrich & Co. (US); Henry Colburn and Co. (UK)
- Publication date: 1820
- Publication place: New York City, New York, United States; London, England, United Kingdom
- Media type: Print (Hardback & Paperback)
- OCLC: 187445421

Precaution is the first novel by American author James Fenimore Cooper, published in 1820.

== Synopsis ==
Precaution is set in the spring of 1815 in Northamptonshire, England. It follows the relationship of Emily Moseley and George Denbigh.

== Development history ==
The novel was written after a challenge made by his wife Susan. Cooper was reading aloud to her from an English novel but found it dull. He threw the book aside and declared he could write a better book than that himself. Susan Cooper challenged her husband to make good on the statement. The result was Precaution, which was published anonymously and instead accredited to an English woman. The publisher, A. T. Goodrich, later surprised the public by revealing that Precaution was authored by a man from New York.

Cooper later noted that, in writing Precaution, he "embraced a crude effort to describe foreign manners". He responded to critics who thought he should focus on American topics by using a more patriotic theme in his next book, The Spy.

Auguste Defauconpret translated Precaution into French in 1825.

== Literary significance and reception ==
Precaution was written in imitation of contemporary English domestic novels like those of Jane Austen and Amelia Opie, and it did not meet with contemporary success. Alistair Cooke personally blasted the novel as unreadably awful. It did, however, make Cooper realize his potential as a writer. The author went on to have great success with works such as The Pathfinder (1841) and The Deerslayer (1840). The American reading public responded most to The Last of the Mohicans (1826).

== Sources ==
- Phillips, Mary Elizabeth (1913). James Fenimore Cooper. John Lane Company, New York, London. pp. 368.Url
- Long, Robert Emmet (1990). James Fenimore Cooper: Literature & Life Story. Continuum: A Fredrick Ungar Book. ISBN 0-8264-0431-6.
- Spiller, Robert E. (1936). James Fenimore Cooper. Minnesota: North Central Publishing Company.
- Walker, Warren (1963). James Fenimore Cooper: An Introduction and Interpretation (2nd ed.). New York: Barnes & Noble.
