= Autobiography of a Pocket-Handkerchief =

1843 novel by James Fenimore Cooper

Autobiography of a Pocket Handkerchief is a serial novel by James Fenimore Cooper first published by Graham's Magazine in 1843. The novel explores the upper crust of New York Society from the perspective of a woman's handkerchief.

After the initial publication in Graham's Magazine the novel was published by several other magazines, including Brother Jonathan. The novel was published in whole in 1843 by Cooper's London publisher Richard Bentley under a separate title, The French Governess; or, The Embroidered Handkerchief. In 1845 a German publisher also published the work in full.

== Themes ==
Critic Thomas Bender describes the whole novel as devoted "to the subject of the evils of selfishly attempting to achieve higher place". The city of New York, in this context, represent the evils of "struggle for social status" and this becomes the model for the woes and disorder caused by this struggle.
