= The Red Rover =

Novel by James Fenimore Cooper

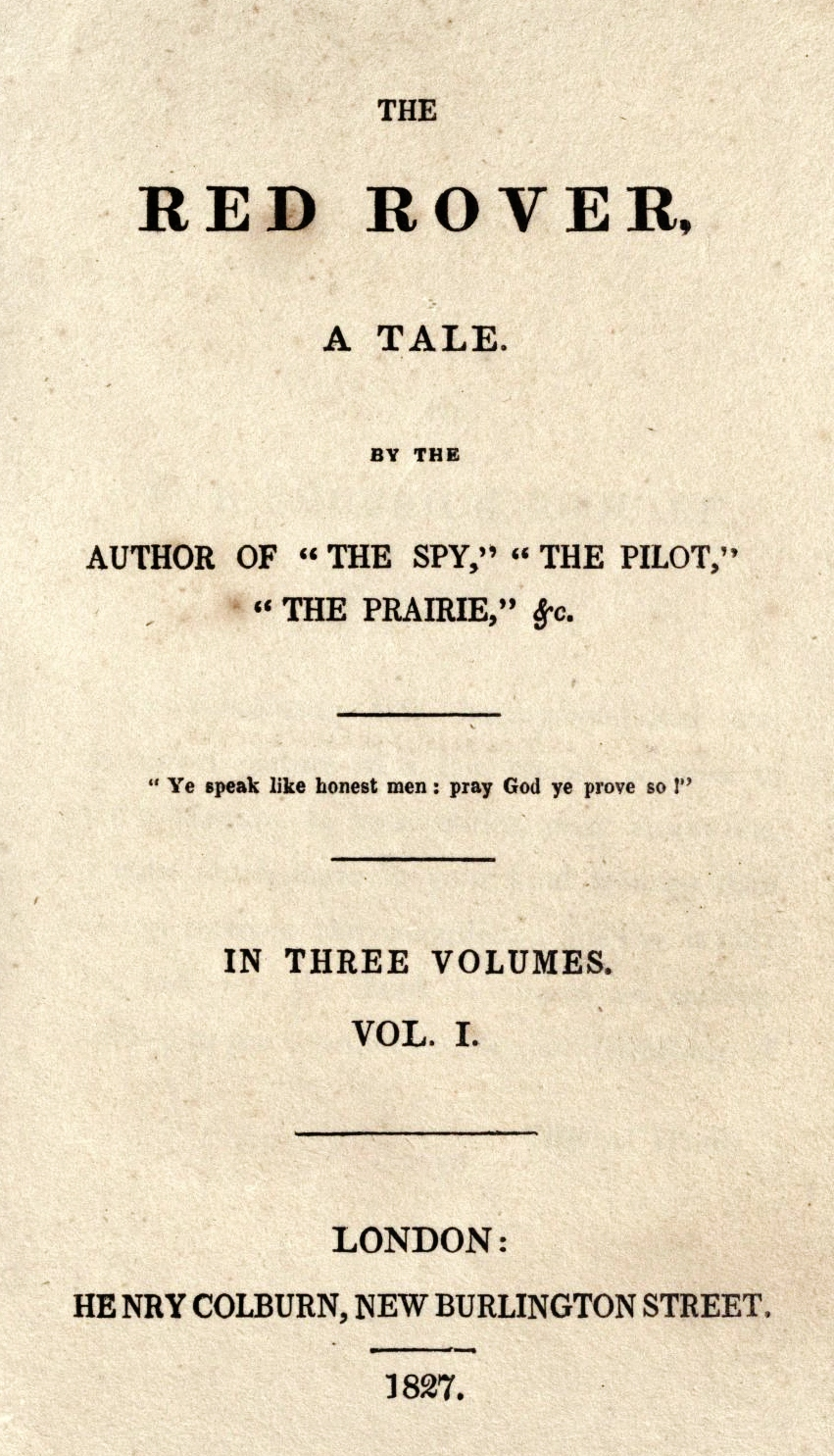
- 1827 title page
- Author: James Fenimore Cooper
- Language: English
- Published: 1827 (Paris), 1827 (UK), 1828 (US)
- Publication place: United States

The Red Rover is a novel by American writer James Fenimore Cooper. It was originally published in Paris on November 27, 1827, before being published in London three days later on November 30. It was not published in the United States until January 9, 1828, in Philadelphia. In the same year, it was translated and published in Germany under the name Red Rover. Soon after its publication it was adapted for theater both in the United States and in England.

The novel follows the activities of the sailor Dick Fid, free black sailor Scipio Africanus and Royal Navy officer James Wilder as they encounter the famous pirate, "The Red Rover". A contemporary reviewer in the North American Review noted how Cooper was particularly good at writing sea novels such as The Red Rover, the sea being his more natural element than what the author calls wilderness novels which focused on an Indian introducing a white man to the wilderness, like The Last of the Mohicans. In addition, The Red Rover presents some of the first serious depictions of characters of African lineage in American literature.

== Characters ==
The two black characters, Scipio Africanus, a free black sailor, and Cassandra, a slave attendant, throughout the novel remain distanced and separate from their white companions. While all the other main characters end the book with positive outcomes, Scipio finds a tragic end. Therman O'Daniel suggests, that though these are some of the first black characters to be seriously treated in American literature, they still receive unsatisfactory outcomes for all their actions.

For Cooper, the sea novel offered an opportunity to blur social barriers between characters. This is particularly evident in his treatment of women, such as a girl disguised as a cabin boy in The Red Rover who is able to function within the crew, even though she is female. Additionally, throughout the novel, a tight friendship exists between Scipio Africanus, fellow sailor Dick Fid, and a Royal Navy officer whom they befriend after saving his life. Though the two men treat him like an officer, deferring to him with respect, they still remain friendly.

== Genre ==
"The annals of America are surprisingly poor in such events; a circumstance that is doubtless owing to the staid character of the people, and especially that portion of them which is addicted to navigation...[the author must] invent his legend without looking for the smallest aid from traditions or facts."

— Cooper in the preface of Red Rover

Cooper is one of the authors credited with helping pioneer the sea novel genre. For him, however, American history before his time hardly offered real maritime tradition to seize in his historical fiction; instead he innovated, writing purely fictional pieces, unlike his novels about other events in American history.

== Theatrical adaptation ==
Forty four days after the first American publication of the novel in 1828, the first theatrical adaptation was performed in the Chestnut Street Theatre in Philadelphia. The adaptation was composed by actor Samuel H. Chapman. The adaptation was published in 1828 – or possibly later – by a publisher in Philadelphia. On May 1, 1828, a second adaptation of the novel was performed in the Park Theater, New York. It was performed multiple times, documented to have had multiple successful runs. A third play is mentioned to have been performed in the Lafayette Circus (Theatre) in New York, however no other evidence exists of it. Subsequently, these early American adaptations were performed another four times before 1862, the evidence is clear which was performed at each performance.

At the same time as American adaptations were being performed, four adaptations were being performed in England. These all made debuts in 1829 at various theaters: one at the Royal Cobourg Theatre, one at the Adelphi Theatre in London, one in the Surrey Theatre, London, and the last in the Sadler's Wells Theatre. Additionally a Victorian burlesque, unacknowledged by early scholars of the plays and books that parodied one of the earlier London adaptations of the novel was performed in the Royal Strand Theatre in London in 1877 and adapted by Francis Cowley Burnand.

== Critical reception ==
In 1828, the North American Review reviewed the work, generally praising it. The Review commented "he has, in this instance, done more and better things for his name, than upon any former occasion", also comparing the text and style to that of Sir Walter Scott.
