= The Spy (Cooper novel) =

1821 novel by James Fenimore Cooper

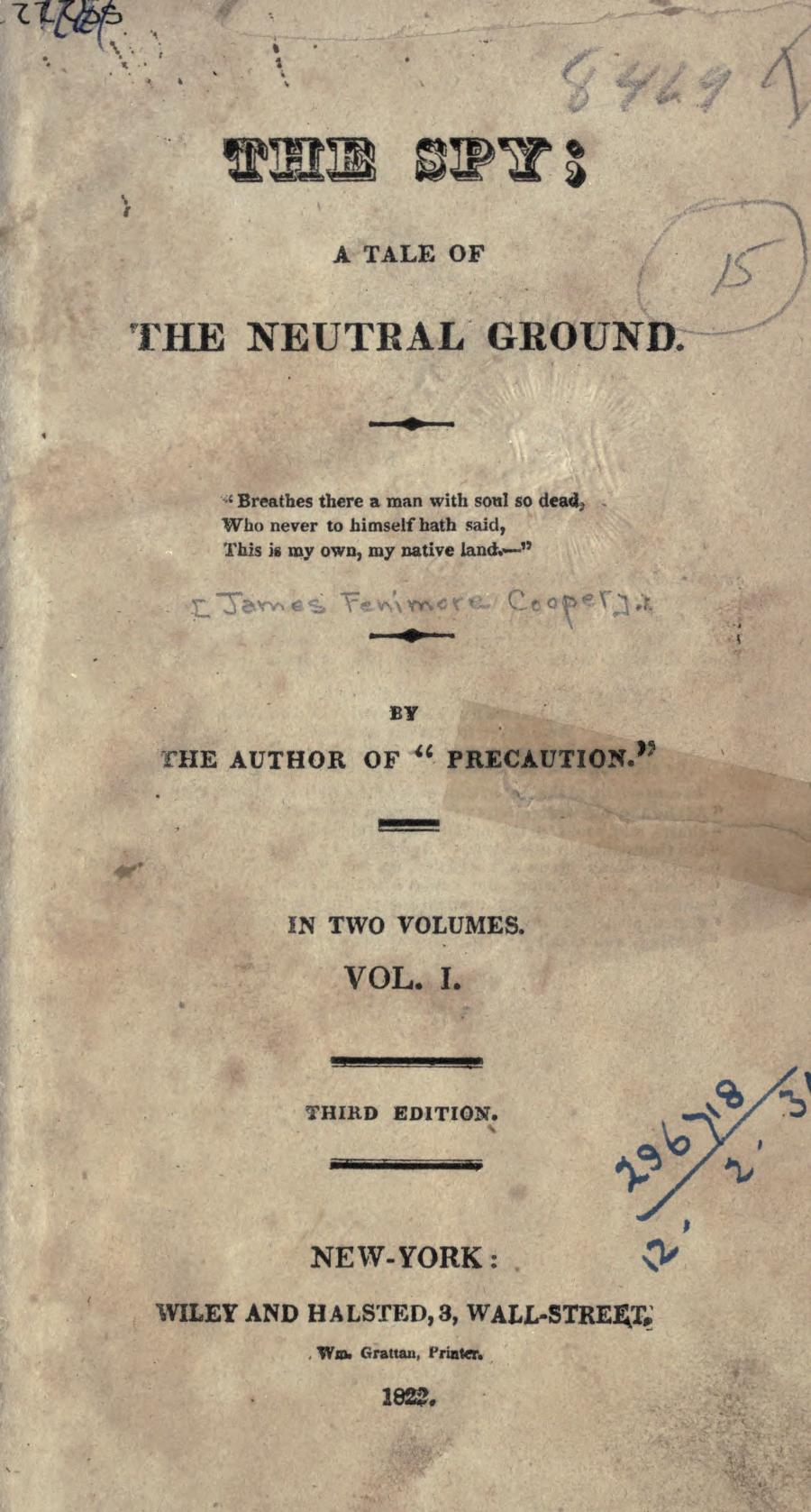
Title page of The Spy by James Fenimore Cooper

The Spy: a Tale of the Neutral Ground is a novel by the American writer James Fenimore Cooper. His second novel, it was published in 1821 by Wiley & Halsted. The plot is set during the American Revolution and was inspired in part by the family friend John Jay. The Spy was successful and began Cooper's reputation as a popular and important American writer.

== Synopsis ==
The action takes place during the American Revolutionary War at "The Locusts", which was the name given to a Colonial-style home in Scarsdale, New York. During the war, Scarsdale was in the no man's land between the British and the North American armies, called the Neutral Ground. The house was built in 1787 by American Major William Popham, an officer who served on the staff of generals George Clinton and George Washington and who served as the 7th President-General of the Society of the Cincinnati, the oldest patriotic organization in the United States. The plot ranges back and forth over the neutral ground between the British and the Continental armies as the home stands between those lines.

An unknown man, known as Mr. Harper, asks for shelter at The Locusts amidst a storm. Mr. Wharton (a Loyalist), his daughters Sarah and Frances, and sister-in-law Miss Peyton, agree to admit him into their home. They are suspicious of him and are cautious in discussing the revolution in his presence. Soon, a peddler named Harvey Birch comes along, with an unknown man, also seeking shelter. Harper eyes him carefully. The stranger is really Henry Wharton, a British army captain. Harper leaves the family, but not before revealing he was already aware of the true identity of Captain Wharton. Birch, who has met privately with Mr. Harper for unknown reasons, strongly urges Captain Wharton to return to his post.

A group of American troops investigates the home of Birch, before making their way to The Locusts. There, Major Peyton Dunwoodie is confronted by Frances Wharton, who loves him and sympathizes with the Patriot cause. She pleads with him not to arrest or harm her brother, Captain Wharton, but Dunwoodie feels his duty too strongly. He learns that Captain Wharton has disguised himself and used a letter forged with George Washington's signature to avoid being found. Dunwoodie realizes that Washington's signature is authentic, however, but the Captain cannot explain how he procured it. Dunwoodie arrests Captain Wharton but learns that British troops are in the area. Dunwoodie rushes to assist his fellow colonists, allowing Captain Wharton to escape in the confusion. Captain Wharton tells his commanding officer, Colonel Wellmere, to be on the lookout of Dunwoodie and his troops. Wellmere does not take his advice and skirmish ensues; he is injured and Captain Wharton is recaptured by Captain Lawton. As Wellmere's troops make their retreat, Dunwoodie brings his friend Captain Singleton to The Locusts to be cared for by Dr. Sitgreaves. Frances suggests summoning Singleton's sister to assist.

Harvey Birch comes under suspicion for being a British spy although he is really a Patriot. Harper is revealed to be Washington in disguise with whom Birch has other meetings in the course of the book. Birch's role is revealed only after he falls in battle.

== Characters ==
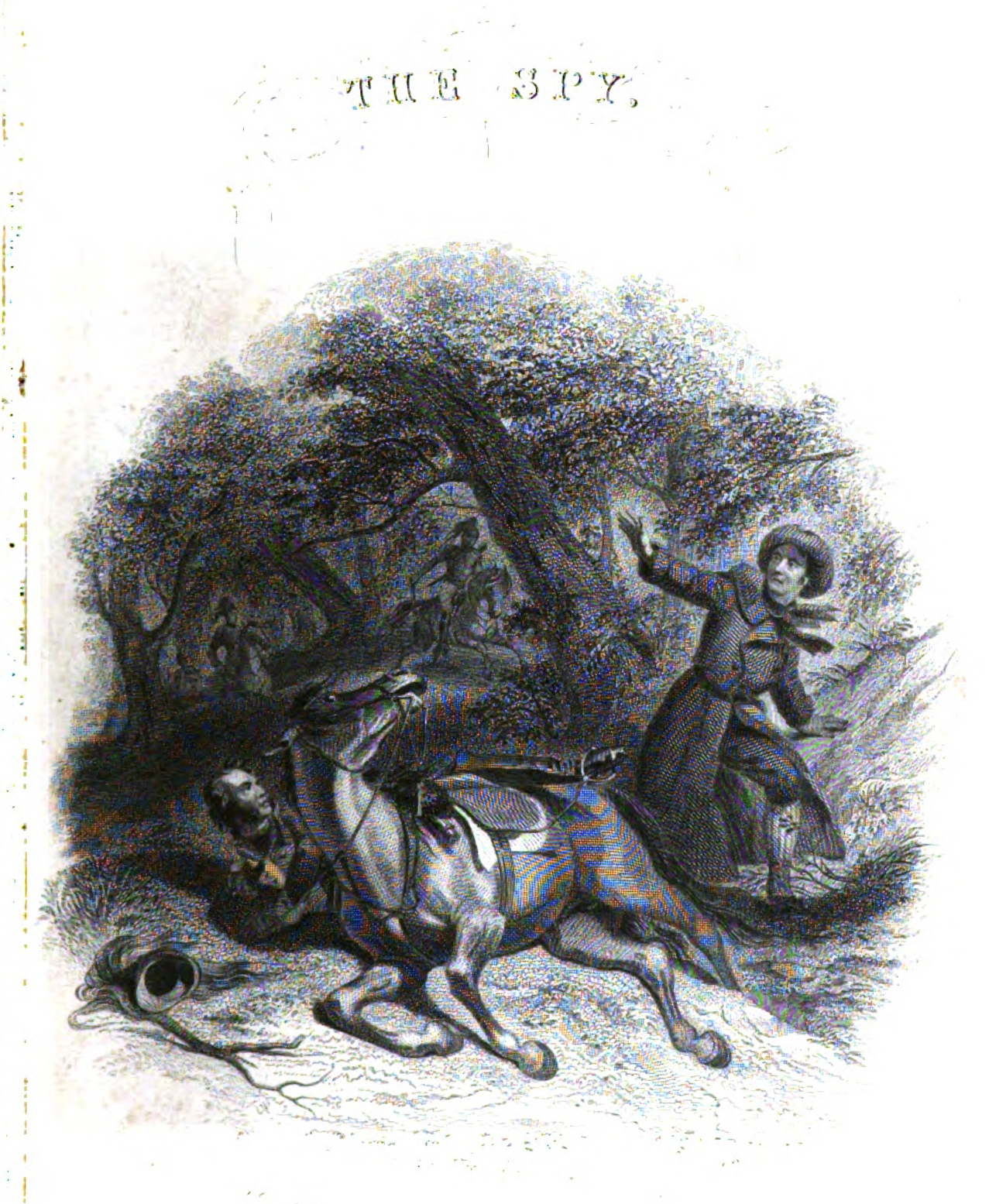
Frontispiece image from the 1855 edition

=== Wharton family ===
- Captain Henry Wharton – British officer, Wharton’s son
- Sarah Wharton – Daughter of Wharton, lover and wife of Colonel Wellmere
- Frances Wharton – Daughter of Wharton, sister of Sarah and Henry Wharton, lover of Major Peyton Dunwoodie
- Mr. Wharton – Father of Henry, Sarah, and Frances
- Miss Jeanette Peyton – Virginia-born aunt and governess to the girls, since the death of their mother
- Ceasar Thomson –a slave from Wharton household

=== Other characters ===
- George Washington – Clad in mufti and using the name Mr. Harper
- Harvey Birch – A Yankee pack peddler, he is really a spy and counter spy in the service of George Washington
- Katy Haynes – Faithful but greedy housekeeper to Harvey Birch, and would-be wife
- Johnny Birch – Father of Harvey Birch
- Major Peyton Dunwoodie – Commanding officer of the Virginia dragoons and secretly engaged to Frances Wharton
- Colonel Wellmere – He, too, leads British royalists and tries to marry Sarah Wharton, although he is already secretly married to another woman in England
- Captain John Lawton – Officer of Virginia dragoons and a friend of Dunwoodie and Sitgreaves
- Isabella Singleton – Sister of George Singleton, who comes to nurse her brother at "The Locust" but is also in love with Dunwoodie
- Captain George Singleton – Officer of Virginia dragoons who is wounded in battle with Wellmere and the brother of Isabella Singleton
- Dr. Archibald Sitgreaves – The comic and grotesque military surgeon
- Anna Sitgreaves – Sister of Dr. Archibald Sitgreaves
- Captain Wharton Dunwoodie – Son of Peyton and Frances Wharton
- Tom Manson Jr – Lieutenant, Captain Wharton Dunwoodie’s friend

== Historical accuracy ==
Harvey Birch, peddler and patriot, is a character remotely founded upon Enoch Crosby, a real spy who helped John Jay. The publisher H. L. Barnum stated that a gentleman of "good standing and respectability" and a personal friend of Cooper had claimed that the author himself told him of the inspiration. Barnum wrote of the connection in 1828 in his book The Spy Unmasked; or, Memoirs of Enoch Crosby, Alias Harvey Birch, The Hero of Mr. Cooper's Tale of the Neutral Ground: Being an Authentic Account of the Secret Services Which He Rendered to his Country During the Revolutionary War (Taken from His Own Lips, in Short-Hand). Cooper would again take up the subject of the American Revolution in his novel The Pilot: A Tale of the Sea (1823–4), also inspired by historical figures.

== Composition ==
Cooper began writing The Spy as early as June 1820, shortly after publishing his book Precaution. In a contemporary letter to publisher Andrew Thompson Goodrich, Cooper wrote he had "commenced another tale to be called the 'Spy'" with the "scene [set] in West-Chester County, and [at the] time of the revolutionary war." The work-in-progress was inspired with persuasion from his wife, Susan, who Cooper referred to as his "female Mentor". Cooper's choice of subject was directly in response to critics of his first book, who wished he would write on more American subjects. Patriotism, Cooper vowed, would be his main theme. He anticipated that the book would be superior to his previous effort but admitted to Goodrich on July 12, 1820, that work on the book "goes on slowly" and it would not be finished until the fall.

== Reception ==
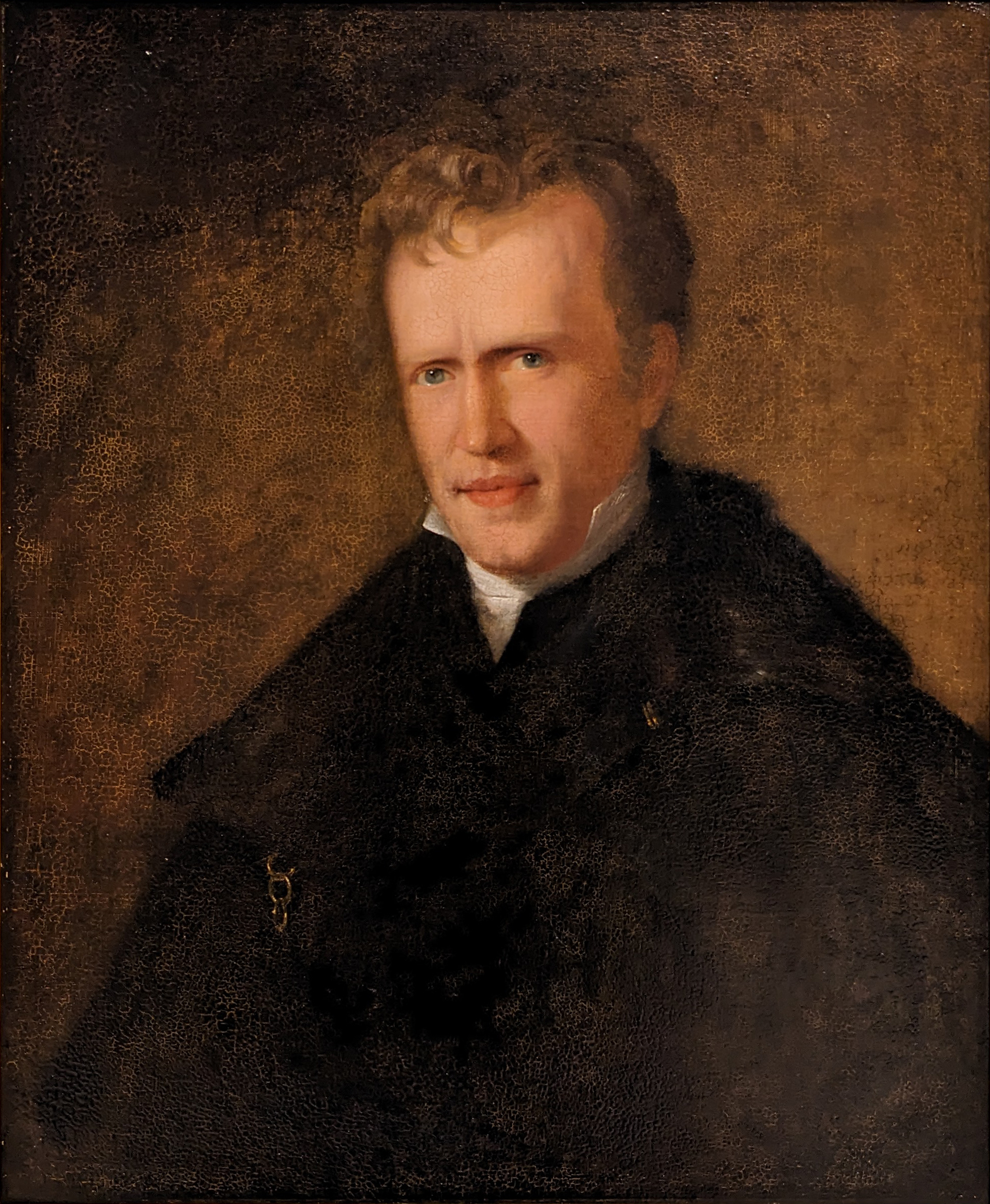
Cooper's chief rival in the early 1820s, John Neal

The novel was successful, and its success came at a critical time in Cooper's life. He was straining to maintain his gentlemanly lifestyle after the collapse of his family fortune, and he wrote his first two novels to test the viability of income from authorship. The original print run of 1000 copies sold out in the first month, with at least 600 copies sold within a year, which earned him royalties of $4000. Years later, in 1831, Cooper gave credit for the book's success on the "love of country" among his American readers. The Literary World later reflected that the book was among the first to celebrate the United States in such a way: "Before 'The Spy' we believe there is scarcely to be found a book from an American pen, in which there is an attempt to delineate American character or scenery, or which selects the soil of the United States as the field of its story". A review in the North American Review noted the book "laid the foundations of American romance".

The book's central character, Harvey Birch, prefigures many of the qualities that Cooper would use in his more famous character, Natty Bumppo, who stars in Cooper's series of books known as Leatherstocking Tales. Birch is an adventurer who resists marrying and traditional society to withdraw into his own natural, moral world.

The Spy was a direct influence on John Neal, who published his own Revolutionary War historical fiction novel, Seventy-Six, two years later in 1823 after he had received the requested feedback on the manuscript from Cooper. Neal's novel provided a stark contrast to Cooper's work in its use of American colloquial language, profanity, and conversational narration and earned him a reputation as Cooper's chief rival as leading American author. Neal in American Writers (1824–25) declared The Spy America's most popular novel, but critiqued it as "rather too full of stage-tricks and clap-traps. The disguises; the pathos; the love-parts; the heroines—are all contemptible."

== Adaptations ==
Two operatic adaptations of the novel exist. La spia, overro, Il merciaiuolo americano, by Angelo Villanis to a libretto by Felice Romani, premiered in Turin at the Teatro Sutera in 1849. The other, by Luigi Arditi to a libretto by Filippo Manetta, premiered in New York City at the Academy of Music on March 24, 1856.
