= Homeward Bound; or The Chase: A Tale of the Sea =

Novel by James Fenimore Cooper

Homeward Bound
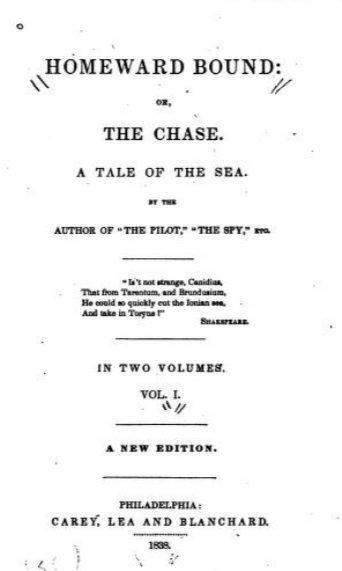
- Author: James Fenimore Cooper
- Original title: Homeward Bound; or The Chase: A Tale of the Sea
- Language: English
- Genre: Nautical fiction
- Published: 1838 (UK), 1838 (US)
- Pages: 2 vol.
- Preceded by: The Prairie
- Followed by: Home as Found: Sequel to Homeward Bound

Homeward Bound; or The Chase: A Tale of the Sea is an 1838 nautical novel written by American writer James Fenimore Cooper.

== Background ==
The novel by Cooper was published in 1838, under the title Homeward Bound; or The Chase: A Tale of the Sea. Homeward Bound is one of Cooper's capital sea novels. The Literary Gazette called the written work "A most spirited and interesting narrative".

The first American edition was published by Carey, Lea, Blanchard in Philadelphia during the summer of 1838. The work comprised two volumes bound into a single book.

It was succeeded by Cooper's 1838 novel, Home as Found: Sequel to Homeward Bound.

== Plot ==
Set in 1835, the Effingham family, descendants of Oliver Effingham from The Pioneers, returns home from Europe aboard the ocean liner Montauk, facing a perilous journey with a violent storm and a skirmish with Arabs off the African coast, with Miss Eve Effingham as the heroine.
