= Mercedes of Castile =

1840 historical novel by James Fenimore Cooper

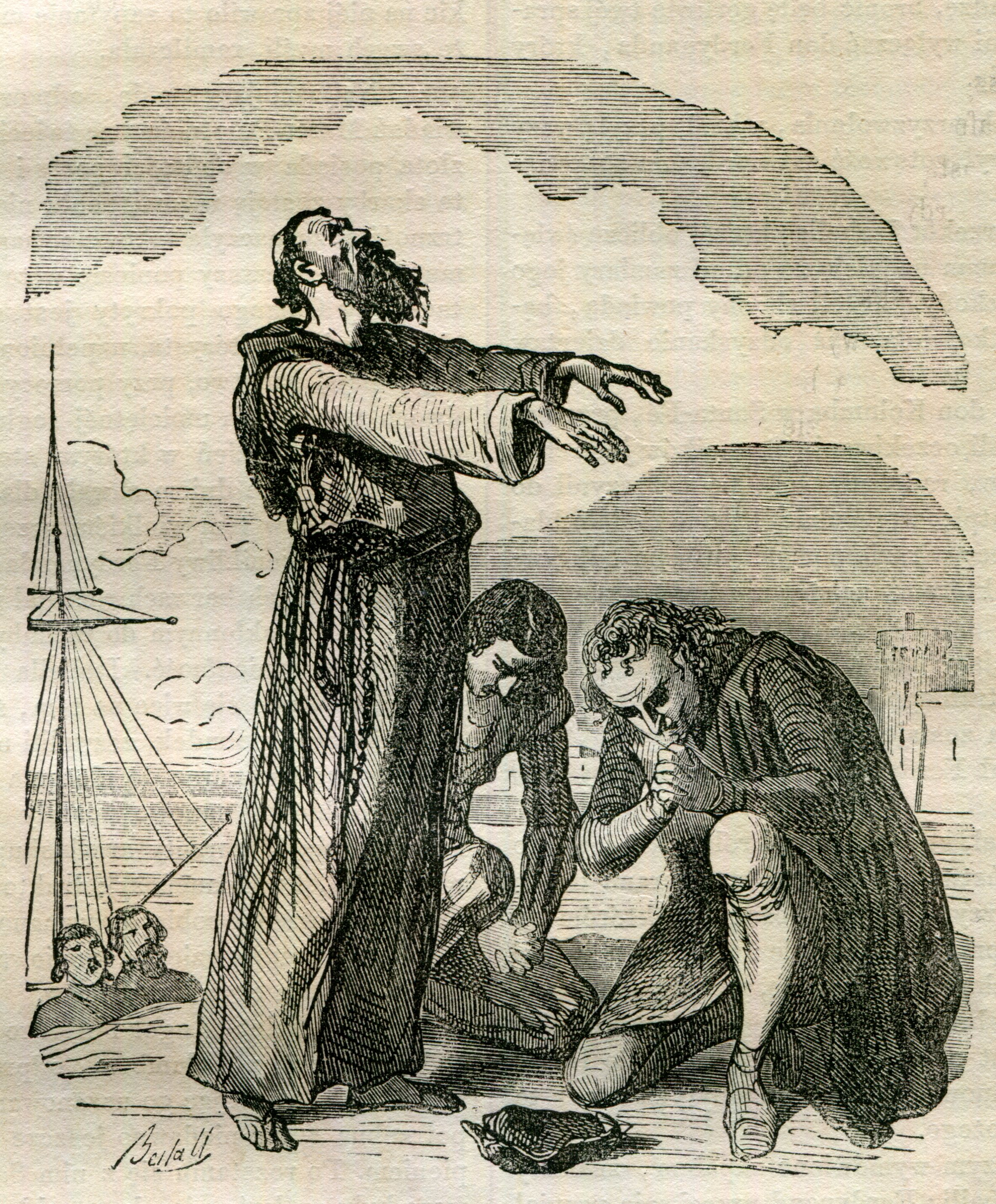
The blessing of Columbus’ sailors before leaving Palos

Mercedes of Castile; or, The Voyage to Cathay is an 1840 historical novel by James Fenimore Cooper. The novel is set in 15th-century Europe, and follows the preparations and expedition of Christopher Columbus westward to the new world.

== Archival materials ==
A full manuscript of the novel is held at the Clifton Waller Barrett Library of American Literature in the Albert and Shirley Small Special Collections Library at the University of Virginia.

== Contemporary reception ==
The New York Review of Books reviewed the novel in 1840 and was unimpressed, saying the novel was not contributing to "any great increase of fame or fortune to Mr Cooper". The review continued to describe the novel as not including much "romance", instead successfully focusing on the historical elements. In 1978, critic Kennedy Williams Jr. agreed with the assessment, noting that the novel uses history well and accurately, but is Cooper's best example of the combination of history and fiction when "fail[ing] miserably" in Cooper's novels.
