= The Two Admirals =

1842 nautical fiction novel by James Fenimore Cooper

The Two Admirals is an 1842 nautical fiction novel by American author James Fenimore Cooper. The novel was written after the Leatherstocking Tales novel The Deerslayer. Set during the 18th century and exploring the British Royal Navy, Cooper wrote the novel out of encouragement of his English publisher, who recommended writing another sea novel. Cooper had originally intended to write a novel where ships were the main characters, though eventually decided not to. The novel is one of three novels which Cooper would revise for editions following their first printing, the other two being The Pathfinder and Deerslayer.

When republishing the novel in the 1860s, Cooper's daughter, Susan Fenimore Cooper, described the novel as "the least successful of his romances of the sea". Despite the novel not having a large legacy, critic Steven Harthorn describes the novel as one of Cooper's deepest studies of masculinity.

The original manuscript for the novel is held by the Special Collections Department at the University of Virginia Library and contains 257 pages.
