= James Fenimore Cooper =

American writer (1789–1851)

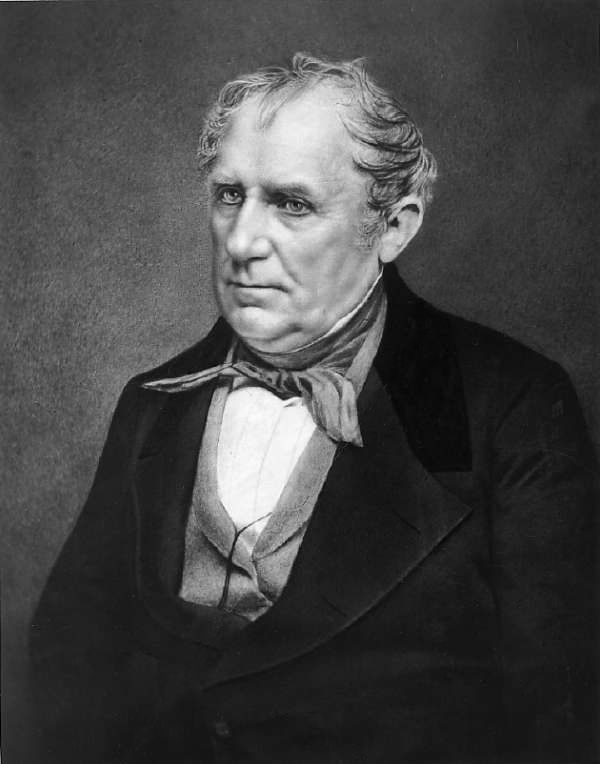
- Image based on a photograph by Mathew Brady, circa 1850
- Born: September 15, 1789; Burlington, New Jersey, U.S.
- Died: September 14, 1851 (aged 61); Cooperstown, New York, U.S.
- Occupation: Author
- Writing career
- Genre: Historical fiction
- Notable work: The Last of the Mohicans Leatherstocking Tales
- Military career
- Allegiance: United States
- Branch: United States Navy
- Service years: 1808–1810
- Rank: Midshipman
- Movement: Romanticism

James Fenimore Cooper (September 15, 1789 – September 14, 1851) was an American writer of the first half of the 19th century, whose historical romances depicting colonial and indigenous characters from the 17th to the 19th centuries brought him fame and fortune. He lived much of his boyhood and his last 15 years in Cooperstown, New York, which was founded by his father William Cooper on property that he owned. Cooper became a member of the Episcopal Church shortly before his death, and contributed generously to it. He attended Yale University for three years, where he was a member of the Linonian Society.

After a stint on a commercial voyage, Cooper served in the U.S. Navy as a midshipman, where he learned the technology of managing sailing vessels, which greatly influenced many of his novels and other writings. The novel that launched his career was The Spy, a tale about espionage set during the American Revolutionary War and published in 1821. He also created American sea stories. His best-known works are five historical novels of the frontier period, written between 1823 and 1841, known as the Leatherstocking Tales, which introduced the iconic American frontier scout, Natty Bumppo. Cooper's works on the U.S. Navy have been well received among naval historians, but they were sometimes criticized by his contemporaries. Among his more famous works is the Romantic novel The Last of the Mohicans, often regarded as his masterpiece. Throughout his career, he published numerous social, political, and historical works of fiction and nonfiction, with the objective of countering European prejudices and nurturing an original American art and culture.

== Early life and education ==
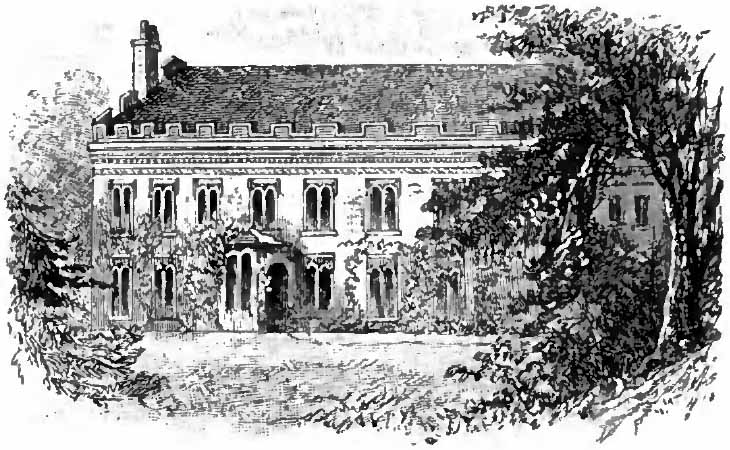
Otsego Hall, Cooper's home in Cooperstown, New York

Cooper was born in Burlington, New Jersey, in 1789 to William Cooper and Elizabeth (Fenimore) Cooper, the 11th of 12 children, half of whom died during infancy or childhood.

Shortly after James' first birthday, his family moved to Cooperstown, New York, a community founded by his father on a large piece of land that he had bought for development. Later, his father was elected to the United States Congress as a representative from Otsego County. Their town was in a central area of New York along the headwaters of the Susquehanna River that had previously been patented to Colonel George Croghan by the Province of New York in 1769. Croghan mortgaged the land before the revolution, and after the war, part of the tract was sold at public auction to William Cooper and his business partner Andrew Craig. By 1788, William Cooper had selected and surveyed the site where Cooperstown would be established. He erected a home on the shore of Otsego Lake and moved his family there in the autumn of 1790. Several years later, he began construction of the mansion that became known as Otsego Hall, completed in 1799 when James was 10.

Cooper was enrolled at Yale University at age 13, but he incited a dangerous prank, which involved blowing up another student's door—after having already locked a donkey in a recitation room. He was expelled in his third year without completing his degree, so he obtained work in 1806 as a sailor and joined the crew of a merchant vessel at age 17. By 1811, he obtained the rank of midshipman in the fledgling United States Navy, conferred upon him by an officer's warrant signed by Thomas Jefferson.

William Cooper had died more than a year before, in 1809, when James was 20. All five of his sons inherited a supposedly large fortune in money, securities, and land titles, which soon proved to be a proliferation of endless litigation. James married Susan Augusta de Lancey at Mamaroneck, Westchester County, New York, on January 1, 1811, at age 21. She was from a wealthy family (de Lancey family), who remained loyal to Great Britain during the revolution. The Coopers had seven children, five of whom lived to adulthood. Their daughter Susan Fenimore Cooper was a writer on nature, female suffrage, and other topics. Her father edited her works and secured publishers for them. One son, Paul Fenimore Cooper, became a lawyer.

== Service in the Navy ==
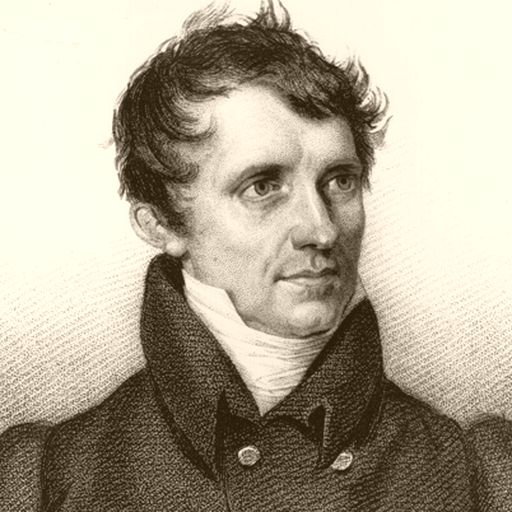
Cooper in his U.S. Navy midshipman's uniform

In 1806 at the age of 17, Cooper joined the crew of the American merchant ship Sterling as a common sailor. At the time, Sterling was captained by young Mainer John Johnston. His first voyage onboard Sterling took him to the English port of Cowes in the Isle of Wight after 40 stormy days. There, the crew acquired information on which British port was best at which to sell their cargo of flour. While anchored off Cowes, Sterling was approached by a Royal Navy warship, which sent a boarding party to the merchant ship. The boarding party proceeded to impress a suspected deserter from the Royal Navy before departing. (Note: Since the outbreak of the French Revolutionary and Napoleonic Wars in 1792, hundreds of Royal Navy sailors had deserted to serve onboard American merchantmen, which strained Anglo-American relations. Attempts by the Royal Navy to reacquire these deserters was met with anger by the American public, and eventually led to the outbreak of the War of 1812.)

Their next voyage took them to the Mediterranean along the coast of Spain, including Águilas and Cabo de Gata, where they picked up cargo to be taken to London and unloaded. Their stay in Spain lasted several weeks and impressed the young sailor, the accounts of which Cooper later referred to in his Mercedes of Castile, a novel about Columbus.

After serving aboard the Sterling for 11 months, he joined the United States Navy on January 1, 1808, when he received his commission as a midshipman. Cooper had conducted himself well as a sailor, and his father, a former U.S. congressman, easily secured a commission for him through his long-standing connections with politicians and naval officials. The warrant for Cooper's commission as midshipman was signed by President Jefferson and mailed by Naval Secretary Robert Smith, reaching Cooper on February 19. On February 24, he received orders to report to the naval commander at New York City. (Note: Accounts vary: Phillips, 1913, p. 53 puts the date at January 12.) Joining the United States Navy fulfilled an aspiration he had had since his youth.

Cooper's first naval assignment came on March 21, 1808, aboard the USS Vesuvius, an 82-foot bomb ketch that carried 12 guns and a 13-inch mortar. For his next assignment, he served under Lieutenant Melancthon Taylor Woolsey near Oswego on Lake Ontario, overseeing the building of the brig USS Oneida for service on the lake. The vessel was intended for use in a potential war with Great Britain. The vessel was completed, armed with 16 guns, and launched in Lake Ontario in the spring of 1809. In this service, Cooper learned shipbuilding, shipyard duties, and frontier life. During his leisure time, Cooper ventured through the forests of New York and explored the shores of Lake Ontario. He occasionally ventured into the Thousand Islands. His experiences in the Oswego area later inspired some of his work, including his novel The Pathfinder. (Note: Records of the government or Department of Navy provide little information regarding his movements and activities in the Navy. Knowledge of Cooper's life comes primarily from what he divulged in his published works, notes, and letters of that period.)

After completion of the Oneida in 1809, Cooper accompanied Woolsey to Niagara Falls, who then was ordered to Lake Champlain to serve aboard a gunboat until the winter, when the lake froze over. Cooper himself returned from Oswego to Cooperstown and then New York City. On November 13 of the same year, he was assigned to the USS Wasp under the command of Captain James Lawrence, who was from Burlington and became a personal friend of Cooper's. Aboard this ship, he met his lifelong friend William Branford Shubrick, who was also a midshipman at the time. Cooper later dedicated The Pilot, The Red Rover, and other writings to Shubrick. Assigned to humdrum recruiting tasks rather than exciting voyages, Cooper resigned his commission from the navy in spring 1810; in the same time, he met, wooed, and became engaged to Susan Augusta de Lancey, whom he married on January 1, 1811.

== Writings ==
=== First endeavors ===
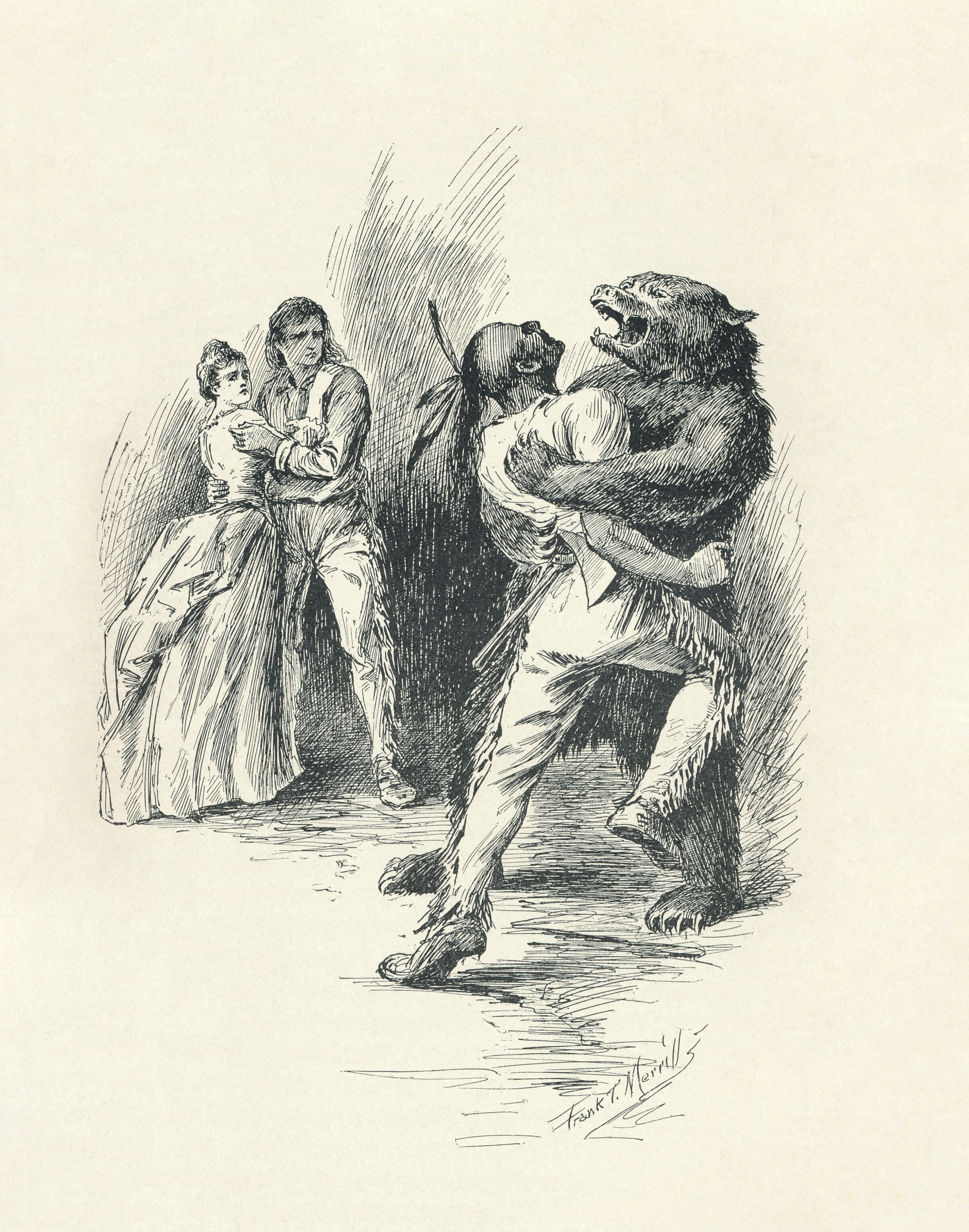
The Last of the Mohicans Illustration from 1896 edition, by J. T. Merrill

In 1820, when reading a contemporary novel to his wife Susan, he decided to try his hand at fiction, resulting in a neophyte novel set in England he called Precaution (1820). Its focus on morals and manners was influenced by Jane Austen's approach to fiction. Precaution was published anonymously and received modestly favorable notice in the United States and England. By contrast, his second novel The Spy (1821) was inspired by an American tale related to him by neighbor and family friend John Jay. It became the first novel written by an American to become a bestseller at home and abroad, requiring several reprintings to satisfy demand. Set in the Neutral Ground between British and American forces and their guerrilla allies in Westchester County, New York, the action centers on spying and skirmishing taking place in and around what is widely believed to be John Jay's family home The Locusts in Rye, New York, of which a portion still exists today as the historic Jay Estate.

Following on a swell of popularity, Cooper published The Pioneers, the first of the Leatherstocking series in 1823. The series features the interracial friendship of Natty Bumppo, a resourceful American woodsman who is at home with the Delaware Indians, and their chief, Chingachgook. Bumppo was also the main character of Cooper's most famous novel The Last of the Mohicans (1826), written in New York City, where Cooper and his family lived from 1822 to 1826. The book became one of the more widely read American novels of the 19th century. At this time, Cooper had been living in New York City on Beach Street in what is now downtown's Tribeca.

In 1823, he became a member of the American Philosophical Society in Philadelphia. In August of that same year, his first son died. He organized the influential Bread and Cheese Club that brought together American writers, editors, artists, scholars, educators, art patrons, merchants, lawyers, politicians, and others.

In 1824, General Lafayette arrived from France aboard the Cadmus at Castle Garden in New York City as the nation's guest. Cooper witnessed his arrival and was one of the active committees of welcome and entertainment.

=== Europe ===
In 1826, Cooper moved his family to Europe, where he sought to gain more income from his books, provide better education for his children, improve his health, and observe European manners and politics firsthand. While overseas, he continued to write. His books published in Paris include The Prairie, the third Leatherstocking Tale in which Natty Bumppo dies in the western land newly acquired by Jefferson as the Louisiana Purchase. There, he also published The Red Rover and The Water-Witch, two of his many sea stories. During his time in Paris, the Cooper family became active in the small American expatriate community. He became friends with painter (and later inventor) Samuel Morse and with French general and American Revolutionary War hero Gilbert du Motier, Marquis de Lafayette. Cooper admired the patrician liberalism of Lafayette, who sought to recruit him to his causes, and eulogized him as a man who "dedicated youth, person, and fortune, to the principles of liberty."

In Europe, Cooper's hostility to the perceived corruption of European aristocracy grew as he witnessed the effect they had on the politics of the United Kingdom and France, in particular, what Cooper considered to be the power they held in national legislature and judiciaries to the exclusion of other classes. In 1832, he entered the lists as a political writer in a series of letters to Le National, a Parisian journal. He defended the United States against a string of charges brought by the Revue Britannique. For the rest of his life, he continued skirmishing in print, sometimes for the national interest, sometimes for that of the individual, and frequently for both at once.

This opportunity to make a political confession of faith reflected the political turn that he already had taken in his fiction, having attacked European antirepublicanism in The Bravo (1831). Cooper continued this political course in The Heidenmauer (1832) and The Headsman: The Abbaye des Vignerons (1833). The Bravo depicted Venice as a place where a ruthless oligarchy lurks behind the mask of the "serene republic". All were widely read on both sides of the Atlantic, though some Americans accused Cooper of apparently abandoning American life for European—not realizing that the political subterfuges in the European novels were cautions directed at his American audiences. Thus, The Bravo was roughly treated by some critics in the United States.

=== Back to America ===
Cooper's townhouse at 6 St. Mark's Place in the East Village, Manhattan

In 1833, Cooper returned to the United States and published "A Letter to My Countrymen", in which he gave his criticism of various social and political mores. Promotional material from a modern publisher summarizes his goals as follows:

A Letter to My Countrymen remains Cooper's most trenchant work of social criticism. In it, he defines the role of the "man of letters" in a republic, the true conservative, the slavery of party affiliations, and the nature of the legislative branch of government. He also offers her most persuasive argument on why America should develop its own art and literary culture, ignoring the aristocratically tainted art of Europe.

Influenced by the ideals of classical republicanism, Cooper feared that the orgy of speculation he witnessed was destructive of civic virtue, and warned Americans that it was a "mistake to suppose commerce favorable to liberty"; doing so would lead to a new "moneyed aristocracy". Drawing upon philosophers such as Jean-Jacques Rousseau, Burlamaqui, and Montesquieu, Cooper's political ideas were both democratic, deriving from the consent of the governed, and liberal, concerned with the rights of the individual.

In the later 1830s—despite his repudiation of authorship in "A Letter to My Countrymen"—he published Gleanings in Europe, five volumes of social and political analysis of his observations and experiences in Europe. His two novels Homeward Bound and Home as Found also criticize the flamboyant financial speculation and toadyism he found on his return; some readers and critics attacked the works for presenting a highly idealized self-portrait, which he vigorously denied.

In June 1834, Cooper decided to reopen his ancestral mansion, Otsego Hall, at Cooperstown. It had long been closed and falling into decay; he had been absent from the mansion nearly 16 years. Repairs were begun, and the house was put in order. At first, he wintered in New York City and summered in Cooperstown, but eventually he made Otsego Hall his permanent home.

On May 10, 1839, Cooper published History of the Navy of the United States of America, a work that he had long planned on writing. He publicly announced his intentions to author such a historical work while abroad before departing for Europe in May 1826, during a parting speech at a dinner given in his honor:

Encouraged by your kindness ... I will take this opportunity of recording the deeds and sufferings of a class of men to which this nation owes a debt of gratitude—a class of men among whom, I am always ready to declare, not only the earliest, but many of the happiest days of my youth have been passed.

=== Historical and nautical work ===
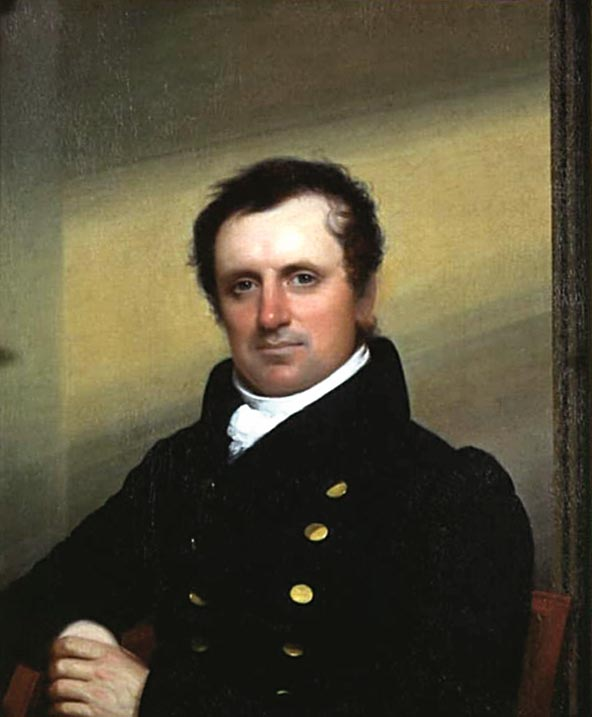
Portrait by John Wesley Jarvis of Cooper in naval uniform

Cooper's historical account of the U.S. Navy was well received, though his account of the roles played by the American leaders in the Battle of Lake Erie led to years of disputes with their descendants, as noted below. Cooper had begun thinking about this massive project in 1824, and concentrated on its research in the late 1830s. His close association with the U.S. Navy and various officers, and his familiarity with naval life at sea provided him the background and connections to research and write this work. Cooper's work is said to have stood the test of time, and is considered an authoritative account of the U.S. Navy during that time.

In 1844, Cooper's Proceedings of the naval court martial in the case of Alexander Slidell Mackenzie, a commander in the navy of the United States, &c. was first published in Graham's Magazine of 1843–44. It was a review of the court-martial of Alexander Slidell Mackenzie, who had hanged three crew members of the brig USS Somers for mutiny while at sea. One of the hanged men, 19-year-old Philip Spencer, was the son of U.S. Secretary of War John C. Spencer. He was executed without court-martial, along with two other sailors aboard the Somers for attempting mutiny.

The Proceedings publication was one of Cooper's print skirmishes. Maritime historian Samuel Eliot Morison called it vindictive revenge for Mackenzie's publishing a critical review of Cooper's inaccurate history of the Battle of Lake Erie, noting that Cooper "flattered himself that his tract would 'finish' Mackenzie as a naval officer, which it certainly did not." Others, however, assert that Cooper recognized the need for absolute discipline in a warship at sea, and felt sympathetic to Mackenzie over his pending court martial.

In 1843, an old shipmate, Ned Myers, re-entered Cooper's life. To assist him—and hopefully to cash in on the popularity of maritime biographies—Cooper wrote Myers's story, which he published in 1843 as Ned Myers; or, A Life Before the Mast, an account of a common seaman still of interest to naval historians.

In 1846, Cooper published Lives of Distinguished American Naval Officers covering the biographies of William Bainbridge, Richard Somers, John Shaw, John Templar Shubrick, and Edward Preble. Cooper died in 1851. In May 1853, Cooper's Old Ironsides appeared in Putnam's Monthly. It was the history of the Navy ship USS Constitution and, after European and American Scenery Compared, 1852, was one of several posthumous publications of his writings. In 1856, five years after Cooper's death, his History of the Navy of the United States of America was republished in an expanded edition. The work was an account of the U.S. Navy in the early 19th century, through the Mexican War. Among naval historians of today, the work has come to be recognized as a general and authoritative account. However, it was criticized for accuracy on some points by some contemporaries, especially those engaged in the disputes over the roles of their relatives in Cooper's separate history of the Battle of Lake Erie. Whig editors of the period regularly attacked anything Cooper wrote, leading him to numerous suits for libel, for example against Park Benjamin, Sr., a poet and editor of the Evening Signal of New York.

=== Critical reaction ===
Cooper's writings of the 1830s related to current politics and social issues, coupled with his perceived self-promotion, increased the ill feeling between the author and some of the public. Criticism in print of his naval histories and the two Home novels came largely from newspapers supporting the Whig party, reflecting the antagonism between the Whigs and their opposition, the Democrats, whose policies Cooper often favored. Cooper's father William had been a staunch Federalist, a party now defunct, but some of whose policies supporting large-scale capitalism the Whigs endorsed. Cooper himself had come to admire Thomas Jefferson, the bete-noire of the Federalists, and had supported Andrew Jackson's opposition to a national bank. Never one to shrink from defending his personal honor and his sense of where the nation was erring, Cooper filed legal actions for libel against several Whig editors; his success with most of his lawsuits ironically led to more negative publicity from the Whig establishment.

Buoyed by his frequent victories in court, Cooper returned to writing with more energy and success than he had had for several years. As noted above, on May 10, 1839, he published his History of the U.S. Navy; his return to the Leatherstocking Tales series with The Pathfinder, or The Inland Sea (1840) and The Deerslayer (1841) brought him renewed favorable reviews. On occasion, though, he returned to addressing public issues, most notably with a trilogy of novels called the Littlepage Manuscripts addressing the issues of the antirent wars. Public sentiment largely favored the antirenters, and Cooper's reviews again were largely negative.

== Later life ==
Faced with competition from younger writers and magazine serialization, and lower prices for books resulting from new technologies, Cooper simply wrote more in his last decade than in either of the previous two. Half of his 32 novels were written in the 1840s. They may be grouped into three categories: Indian romances, maritime fiction, and political and social controversy—though the categories often overlap.

The 1840s began with the last two novels featuring Natty Bumppo, both critical and reader successes: The Pathfinder (1840) and The Deerslayer (1841). Wyandotte, his last novel set in the Revolutionary War, followed in 1843 and Oak Openings in 1848. The nautical works were Mercedes of Castile (in which Columbus appears, 1840), The Two Admirals (British and French fleets in battle, 1842), Wing-And-Wing (a French privateer fighting the British in 1799, 1842), Afloat and Ashore (two volumes exploring a young man growing up, 1844), Jack Tier (a vicious smuggler in the Mexican-American War, 1848), and The Sea Lions (rival sealers in the Antarctic, 1849).

He also turned from pure fiction to the combination of art and controversy in which he achieved notoriety in the novels of the previous decade. His Littlepage Manuscripts trilogy--Satanstoe (1845), The Chainbearer (1845), and The Redskins (1846)—dramatized issues of land ownership in response to renters in the 1840s opposing the long leases common in the old Dutch settlements in the Hudson Valley. He tried his hand with serialization with The Autobiography of a Pocket Handkerchief, first published in Graham's Magazine in 1843, a satire on contemporary nouveau riche. In The Crater; or, Vulcan's Peak (1847) he introduced supernatural machinery to show the decline of an ideal society in the South Seas when demagogues prevail. The Ways of the Hour, his last completed novel, portrayed a mysterious and independent young woman defending herself against criminal charges.

Cooper spent the last years of his life back in Cooperstown. He died on September 14, 1851, the day before his 62nd birthday. He was buried in the Christ Episcopal Churchyard, where his father, William Cooper, was buried. Cooper's wife Susan survived her husband only by a few months and was buried by his side at Cooperstown.

Several well-known writers, politicians, and other public figures honored Cooper's memory with a memorial in New York, five months after his death, in February 1852. Daniel Webster gave a speech to the gathering, while Washington Irving served as a co-chairman, along with William Cullen Bryant, who also gave an address that did much to restore Cooper's damaged reputation among American writers of the time.

== Religious activities ==
Cooper's father was a lapsed Quaker; probably influenced by his wife's family, the DeLanceys, Cooper in his fiction often favorably depicted clergy of the Episcopal Church, though Calvinist ministers came in for their share of both admiring and critical treatment. In the 1840s as Cooper increasingly despaired over the United States maintaining the vision and promise of the Constitution, his fiction increasingly turned to religious themes. In The Wing-And-Wing, 1842, the hero, a French revolutionary free-thinker, loses the Italian girl he loves because he cannot accept her simple Christianity. In contrast, in the 1849 The Sea Lions, the hero wins his beloved only after a spiritual transformation while marooned in the Antarctic, and the 1848 The Oak Openings features a pious Parson Amen who wins the admiration of the Indians who kill him, praying for them during torture.

After establishing permanent residence in Cooperstown, Cooper became active in Christ Church, Episcopal, taking on the roles of warden and vestryman. As the vestryman, he donated generously to this church and later supervised and redesigned its interior with oak furnishings at his own expense. He was also energetic as a representative from Cooperstown to various regional conventions of the Episcopal church, but only several months before his death, in July 1851, was he confirmed in this church by his brother-in-law, the Right Reverend William H. DeLancey.

== Legacy ==
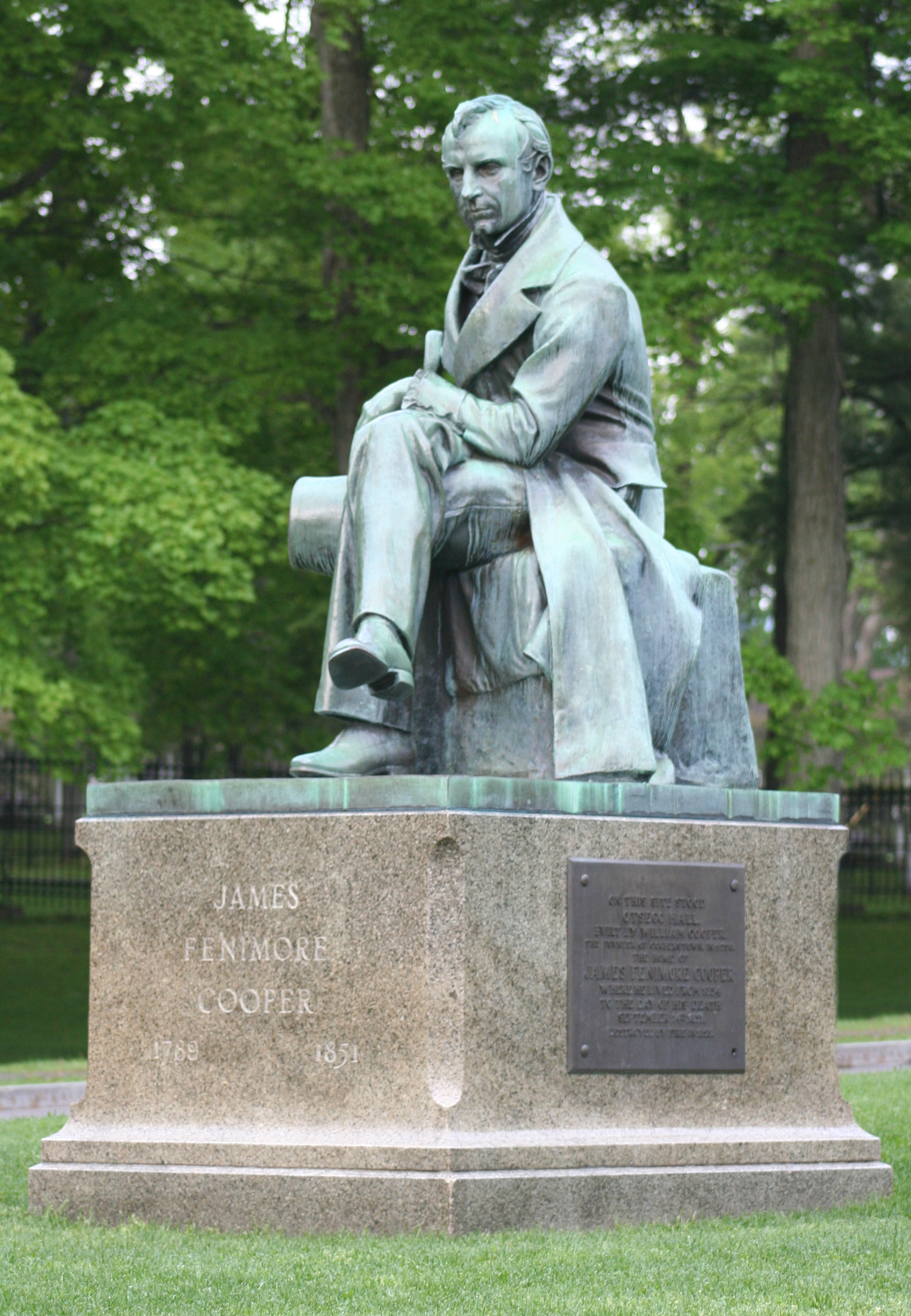
Statue in Cooperstown, New York

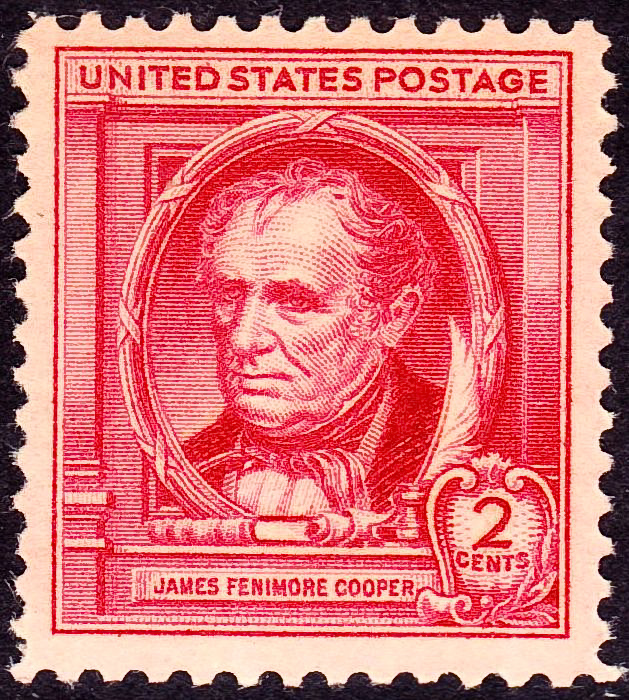
Cooper was honored on a U.S. commemorative stamp, the Famous American series, issued in 1940

Cooper was one of the more popular 19th-century American authors, and his work was admired greatly throughout the world. While on his death bed, Austrian composer Franz Schubert wanted most to read more of Cooper's novels. Honoré de Balzac, French novelist and playwright, admired him greatly. Henry David Thoreau, while attending Harvard, incorporated some of Cooper's style in his own work. D.H. Lawrence believed that Turgenev, Tolstoy, Dostoyevsky, Maupassant, and Flaubert were all "so very obvious and coarse, besides the lovely, mature and sensitive art of Fennimore Cooper." Lawrence called The Deerslayer "one of the most beautiful and perfect books in the world: flawless as a jewel and of gem-like concentration."

Cooper's work, particularly The Pioneers and The Pilot, demonstrate an early 19th-century American preoccupation with alternating prudence and negligence in a country where property rights were often still in dispute.

Cooper was one of the early major American novelists to include African, African-American, and Native American characters in his works. In particular, Native Americans play central roles in his Leatherstocking Tales. However, his treatment of this group is complex and highlights the relationship between frontier settlers and American Indians as exemplified in The Wept of Wish-ton-Wish, depicting a captured White girl who marries an Indian chief and has a baby with him, but after several years is eventually returned to her parents. Often, he gives contrasting views of Native characters to emphasize their potential for good, or conversely, their proclivity for mayhem. The Last of the Mohicans includes both the character of Magua, who, fearing the extinction of his race at the hands of the Whites, betrays them, as well as Chingachgook, the last chief of the Mohicans, who is portrayed as Natty Bumppo's noble, courageous, and heroic counterpart.

In 1831, Cooper was elected to the National Academy of Design as an Honorary Academician.

According to Tad Szulc, Cooper was a devotee of Poland's causes (uprisings to regain Polish sovereignty). He organized a club in Paris to support the rebels, and brought flags of the defeated Polish rebel regiment from Warsaw to present them to the exiled leaders in Paris. With his friend, the Marquis de La Fayette, he supported liberals during the regime changes in France and elsewhere in the 1830s.

Though some scholars have hesitated to classify Cooper as a strict Romantic, Victor Hugo pronounced him "the greatest novelist of the century" outside France. Honoré de Balzac, while mocking a few of Cooper's novels ("rhapsodies") and expressing reservations about his portrayal of characters, enthusiastically called The Pathfinder a masterpiece and professed great admiration for Cooper's portrayal of nature, only equaled in his view by Walter Scott. Mark Twain, the ultimate Realist, criticized the Romantic plots and overwrought language of The Deerslayer and The Pathfinder in his satirical but shrewdly observant essay, "Fenimore Cooper's Literary Offenses" (1895).

Cooper was also criticized heavily in his day for his depiction of women characters in his work. James Russell Lowell, Cooper's contemporary and a critic, referred to it poetically in A Fable for Critics, writing, "... the women he draws from one model don't vary / All sappy as maples and flat as a prairie."

Cooper's lasting reputation today rests largely upon the five Leatherstocking Tales. In his 1960 study focusing on romantic relationships, both hetero- and homosexual, literary scholar Leslie Fiedler opines that with the exception of the five Natty Bumppo-Chingachgook novels, Cooper's "collected works are monumental in their cumulative dullness." More recent criticism views all 32 novels in the context of Cooper's responding to changing political, social, and economic realities in his time period.

Cooper was honored on a U.S. commemorative stamp, the Famous American series, issued in 1940.

Cooper appears briefly as a character in Anya Seton's 1944 historical romance Dragonwyck.

Three dining halls at the State University of New York at Oswego are named in Cooper's remembrance (Cooper Hall, The Pathfinder, and Littlepage) because of his temporary residence in Oswego and for setting some of his works there.

Cooper Park in Michigan's Comstock Township is named after him.

The New Jersey Turnpike has a James Fenimore Cooper service area in Mount Laurel, recognizing his birth in the state.

The gilded and red tole chandelier hanging in the library of the White House in Washington, DC, is from the family of James Fenimore Cooper. It was brought there through the efforts of First Lady Jacqueline Kennedy in her great White House restoration. The James Fenimore Cooper Memorial Prize at New York University is awarded annually to an outstanding undergraduate student of journalism.

In 2013, Cooper was inducted into the New York Writers Hall of Fame.

Cooper's novels were very popular in the rest of the world, including, for instance, Russian Empire. In particular, great interest of the Russian public in Cooper's work was primarily incited by the novel The Pathfinder, which Russian literary critic Vissarion Belinsky declared to be "a Shakespearean drama in the form of a novel". The author was more recognizable by his middle name, Fenimore, exotic to many in the Russian Empire (and later the USSR). This name became a symbol of exciting adventures among Soviet readers. For example, in the 1977 Soviet movie The Secret of Fenimore (Russian: Тайна Фенимора), being the third part of a children's television miniseries Three Cheerful Shifts (Russian: Три весёлые смены), tells of a mysterious stranger known as Fenimore, visiting a boys' dorm in a summer camp nightly and relating fascinating stories about Indians and extraterrestrials.

== Works ==
=== Novels ===
| Date | Title: Subtitle | Period | Location | Series | Topic |
|---|---|---|---|---|---|
| 1820 | Precaution | 1813–1814 | England | | Upper-class romances |
| 1821 | The Spy: A Tale of the Neutral Ground | 1780 | Westchester County, New York | American Revolutionary War#3 | Conflicts and espionage between military and guerrilla forces in Revolutionary War |
| 1823 | The Pioneers; or, The Sources of the Susquehanna | 1793–1794 | Otsego County, New York | Leatherstocking#4 | A "Descriptive Tale" of early Cooperstown |
| 1824 | The Pilot: A Tale of the Sea | 1780 | England | American Revolutionary War#4 | John Paul Jones. The American Revolution at sea |
| 1825 | Lionel Lincoln; or, The Leaguer of Boston | 1775–1781 | Boston | American Revolutionary War#2 | Conflicts between Patriots and Loyalists leading to Bunker Hill |
| 1826 | The Last of the Mohicans: A narrative of 1757 | 1757 | Lake George & Adirondacks | Leatherstocking#2 | French and Indian War |
| 1827 | The Prairie | 1805 | American Midwest | Leatherstocking#5 | The Louisiana Purchase |
| 1828 | The Red Rover: A Tale | 1759 | Newport, Rhode Island & Atlantic Ocean | | pirates |
| 1829 | The Wept of Wish-ton-Wish: A Tale | 1660–1676 | Western Connecticut | | Puritans and Indians, King Philip's War |
| 1830 | The Water-Witch; or, The Skimmer of the Seas | 1713 | New York | | smugglers |
| 1831 | The Bravo: A Tale | 18th century | Venice | European Trilogy#2 | Corruption of the Venetian Republic by oligarchs |
| 1832 | The Heidenmauer; or, The Benedictines, A Legend of the Rhine | 16th century | German Rhineland | European Trilogy#1 | The Protestant reformation and greed |
| 1833 | The Headsman: The Abbaye des Vignerons | 18th century | Geneva, Switzerland, & the Alps | European Trilogy#3 | |
| 1835 | The Monikins | 1830s | Antarctica | | Aristocratic monkeys; a satire on British and American politics. |
| 1838 | Homeward Bound; or The Chase: A Tale of the Sea | 1835 | Atlantic Ocean & North African coast | Leatherstocking#6 | The Effingham family, descendants of Oliver Effingham of The Pioneers, return home from Europe |
| 1838 | Home as Found: Sequel to Homeward Bound | 1835 | New York City & Templeton/Cooperstown, New York | Leatherstocking#7 | Eve Effingham and her family encounter a social world new to them |
| 1840 | The Pathfinder, or The Inland Sea | 1759 | Western New York | Leatherstocking#3 | Middle-aged Natty Bumppo falls in love |
| 1840 | Mercedes of Castile; or, The Voyage to Cathay | 1490s | West Indies | | Christopher Columbus |
| 1841 | The Deerslayer; or, The First Warpath | 1740–1745 | Otsego Lake | Leatherstocking#1 | Natty Bumppo as a youth |
| 1842 | The Two Admirals | 1745 | England & English Channel | | Scottish uprising |
| 1842 | The Wing-and-Wing; or, Le Feu-Follet (Jack o Lantern) | 1799 | Italian coast | | Napoleonic Wars |
| 1843 | Wyandotté; or, The Hutted Knoll. A Tale | 1763–1776 | Butternut Valley of Otsego County, New York | American Revolutionary War#1 | Indian romance |
| 1844 | Afloat and Ashore; or, The Adventures of Miles Wallingford. A Sea Tale | 1795–1805 | Ulster County & worldwide | Miles Wallingford#1 | |
| 1844 | Miles Wallingford: Sequel to Afloat and Ashore; UK title: Lucy Hardinge: A Second Series of Afloat and Ashore (1844) | 1795–1805 | Ulster County & worldwide | Miles Wallingford#2 | |
| 1845 | Satanstoe; or, The Littlepage Manuscripts, a Tale of the Colony | 1758 | New York City, Westchester County, Albany, Adirondacks | Littlepage#1 | Prequel to the "anti-rent wars" |
| 1845 | The Chainbearer; or, The Littlepage Manuscripts | 1780s | Westchester County, Adirondacks | Littlepage#2 | Next Littlepage generation tries to settle in their lands after the Revolutionary War |
| 1846 | The Redskins; or, Indian and Injin: Being the Conclusion of the Littlepage Manuscripts | 1845 | Adirondacks | Littlepage#3 | Anti-rent wars. The "anti-rent" war full blown |
| 1847 | The Crater; or, Vulcan's Peak: A Tale of the Pacific (Mark's Reef) | 1810s | Philadelphia, Bristol (PA), & deserted Pacific island | | Utopia destroyed by political strife |
| 1848 | Jack Tier; or, The Florida Reefs a.k.a. Captain Spike; or, The Islets of the Gulf | 1846 | Florida Keys | | Mexican War |
| 1848 | The Oak Openings; or, The Bee-Hunter | 1812 | Kalamazoo River, Michigan | | War |
| 1849 | The Sea Lions: The Lost Sealers | 1819–1820 | Long Island & Antarctica | | Heavy emphasis on religion. |
| 1850 | The Ways of the Hour | 1846 | "Dukes County, New York" | | murder/courtroom mystery, legal corruption, women's rights |

=== Novelette ===
| Date | Title: Subtitle | Period | Location | Topic |
|---|---|---|---|---|
| 1843 | Autobiography of a Pocket-Handkerchief, also published as: Le Mouchoir: An Autobiographical Romance; The French Governess; or, The Embroidered Handkerchief; Die franzosischer Erzieheren: oder das gestickte Taschentuch | 1830s | France & New York | Social satire on the nouveau riche |

=== Short stories ===
| Date | Title: subtitle | Topic |
|---|---|---|
| 1823 | Tales for Fifteen; or, Imagination and Heart | moralistic collection of 2 tales written under the pseudonym: Jane Morgan |
| 1832 | No Steamboats | allegory satirising European misconceptions about America which Cooper first wrote in French |
| 1836 | An Execution at Sea | execution of a murderer on a ship. Cooper's authorship is questionable. |
| 1851 | The Lake Gun | Seneca Lake in New York, political satire based on folklore |

=== Play ===
| Date | Title: Subtitle | Topic |
|---|---|---|
| 1850 | Upside Down; or, Philosophy in Petticoats | satirisation of socialism |

=== Non-fiction ===
| Date | Title: subtitle | Genre | Topic |
|---|---|---|---|
| 1828 | Notions of the Americans: Picked up by a Travelling Bachelor | non-fiction | Cooper's response to Lafayette's request to present Americas favourably to Europeans |
| 1830 | Letter to General Lafayette | politics | France vs. US, cost of government |
| 1834 | A Letter to His Countrymen | politics | Why Cooper temporarily stopped writing |
| 1836 | The Eclipse; Listen to The Eclipse by James Fenimore Cooper on YouTube | memoir | Solar eclipse in Cooperstown, New York Cooper's reaction to a criminal whose execution was stayed, 1806 |
| 1836 | Gleanings in Europe: Switzerland (Sketches of Switzerland) | travel | Hiking in Switzerland, 1828. All five Gleanings books full of social and political commentary. |
| 1836 | Gleanings in Europe: The Rhine (Sketches of Switzerland, Part Second) | travel | Travels France, Rhineland & Switzerland, 1832 |
| 1836 | A Residence in France: With an Excursion Up the Rhine, and a Second Visit to Switzerland | travel | |
| 1837 | Gleanings in Europe: France | travel | Living, travelling in France, 1826–1828; author's involvement in the political upheavals of the period |
| 1837 | Gleanings in Europe: England | travel | Travels in England, 1826, 1828, 1833; dislike of English aristocracy |
| 1838 | Gleanings in Europe: Italy | travel | Living, travelling in Italy, 1828–1830 |
| 1838 | The American Democrat; or, Hints on the Social and Civic Relations of the United States of America | non-fiction | US society and government |
| 1838 | The Chronicles of Cooperstown | history | Local history of Cooperstown, New York |
| 1839 | The History of the Navy of the United States of America | history | U.S. naval history to date |
| 1839 | Old Ironsides | history | History of the Frigate USS Constitution, 1st pub. 1853 |
| 1843 | Richard Dale | biography | |
| 1843 | Ned Myers; or, Life before the Mast | biography | of Cooper's shipmate who survived an 1813 sinking of a US sloop of war in a storm |
| 1844 | Proceedings of the naval court martial in the case of Alexander Slidell Mackenzie | non-fiction | Detailed legal assessment of Mackenzie's execution of alleged mutineers |
| 1846 | Lives of Distinguished American Naval Officers | biography | |
| 1851 | New York; or, The Towns of Manhattan | history | Unfinished, history of New York City, 1st pub. 1864 |

== Bibliography ==
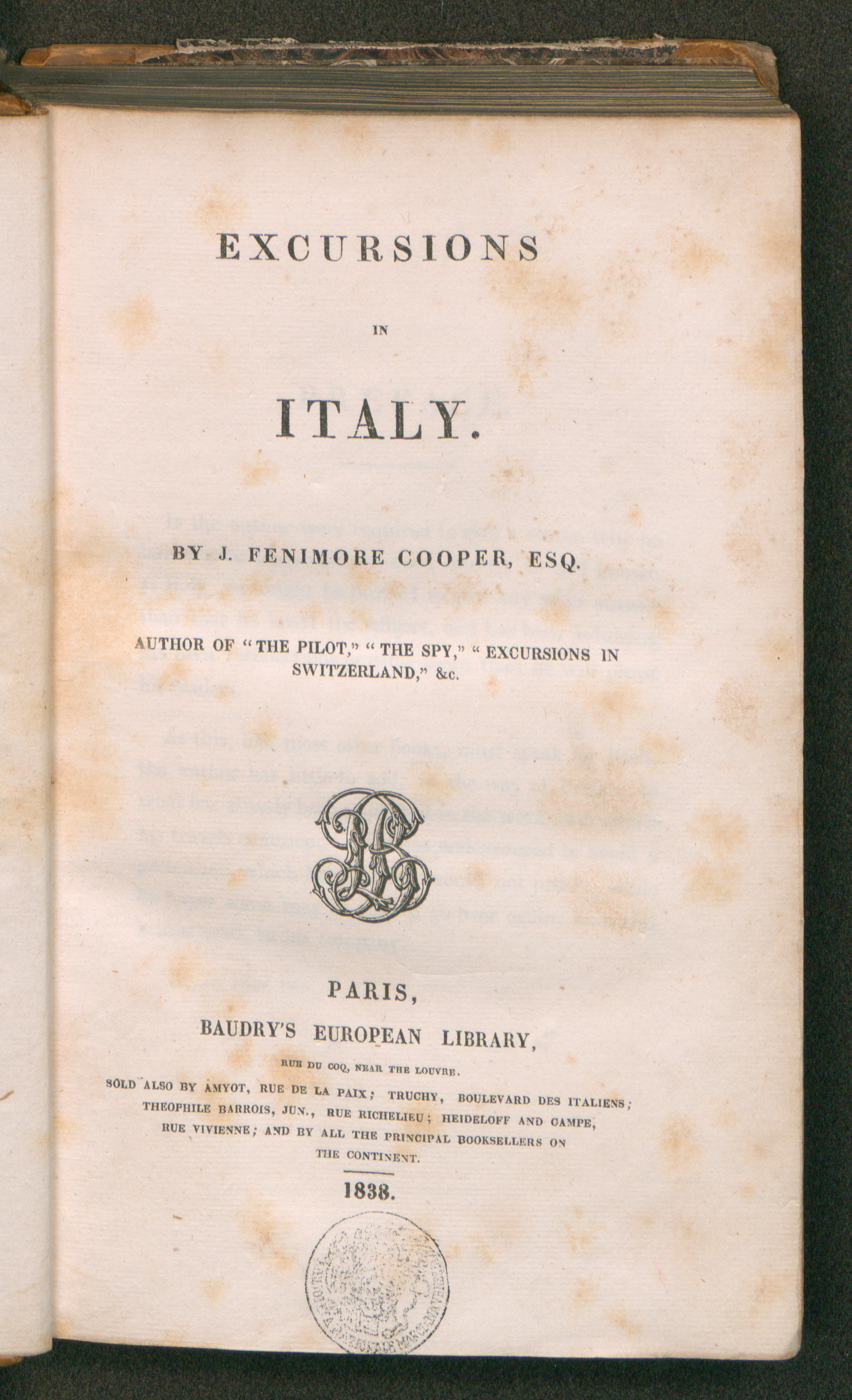
Excursions in Italy, 1838

- Evans, Sarah; Fifer, Abby; Reynolds, Jenn (2014). "Biography of James Fenimore Cooper (1789-1851)". American Studies at the University of Virginia. Archived from the original on March 27, 2014.
- Clymer, William Branford Shubrick (1900). James Fenimore Cooper. Beacon Biographies of Eminent Americans. Boston: Small, Maynard & Company. ISBN 978-0-795-01172-6. Read at the Internet Archive (Registration is required)
- Franklin, Wayne (2007). James Fenimore Cooper: The Early Years. Yale University Press. ISBN 978-0-300-10805-7. Read at the Internet Archive (Registration is required)
- Franklin, Wayne (2017). James Fenimore Cooper: The Later Years. Yale University Press. ISBN 978-0-300-13571-8.
- Hale, Edward Everett (1896). Illustrious Americans, Their Lives and Great Achievements. Hamilton Wright Mabie. Philadelphia and Chicago: International Publishing Company Philadelphia and Chicago, Entered 1896, by W.E. Scull, in the office of the Librarian of Congress, Washington, DC. ISBN 978-1-162-22702-3.
- Lounsbury, Thomas R. (1882). James Fenimore Cooper. American Men of Letters. Boston: Houghton, Mifflin and Company.
- McCullough, David (2011). The Greater Journey: Americans in Paris. Simon & Schuster. ISBN 978-1-4165-7176-6.
- O'Daniel, Therman B. (1947). "Cooper's Treatment of the Negro". Phylon. 8 (2): 164–176. doi:10.2307/271724. JSTOR 271724.
- Phillips, Mary Elizabeth (1913). James Fenimore Cooper. New York and London: John Lane Company. ISBN 978-0-795-01174-0. Read at the Internet Archive (Registration is required)
- Roosevelt, Theodore (1883). The Naval War of 1812. New York: G. P. Putnam's Sons. Read at the Internet Archive (Registration is required)
- Wright, Wayne W. (1983). MacDougal, Hugh C. (ed.). "The Cooper Genealogy". Proceedings of New York State Historical Association. Archived from the original on November 14, 2018.

=== Primary sources ===
- Fenimore Cooper, James (1846). Lives of distinguished American naval officers. Philadelphia: Carey and Hart. OCLC 620356. Read at the Internet Archive (Registration is required)
- Fenimore Cooper, James (1852). The Chainbearer; or, The Littlepage Manuscripts. New York: Stringer & Townsend.
- Fenimore Cooper, James (1856). History of the Navy of the United States of America. New York: Stringer & Townsend. ISBN 978-0-665-44639-9. OCLC 197401914. Alternative copy at the Internet Archive (Registration is required)
