= Wyandotté (novel) =

Historical novel by James Fenimore Cooper

Wyandotté is a historical novel published by James Fenimore Cooper in 1843. The novel is set in New York state during the American Revolution. The main character of the novel is an Indian, "Saucy Nick", also called Wyandotté ("Great Chief"), whose depictions violate stereotypes of Native Americans.

Critic James H. Pickering described the novel as rejecting the more established histories of the New York/Canada border war during the Revolution. In part the novel represents Cooper's own knowledge of the regional oral history and affiliation with soldiers who had experienced the war.

== Critical reception ==
In his 1968 review of the novel, critic James H. Pickering called the novel one of "Cooper's more successful efforts".
