= Home as Found =

1838 novel by James Fenimore Cooper

- First editions
- Author: James Fenimore Cooper
- Language: English
- Series: Effingham novels
- Published: 1838
- Publisher: Lea and Blanchard
- Publication place: United States
- Media type: Print (hardback & paperback)
- Preceded by: Homeward Bound; or The Chase: A Tale of the Sea

Home as Found (1838) is a novel written by James Fenimore Cooper. It takes place in the fictional town of Templeton, which is modeled after the village of Cooperstown. In the novel the Effingham family moves back to Templeton from New York City.
