= The Sea Lions =

1849 novel by James Fenimore Cooper

The Sea Lions; Or, The Lost Sealers
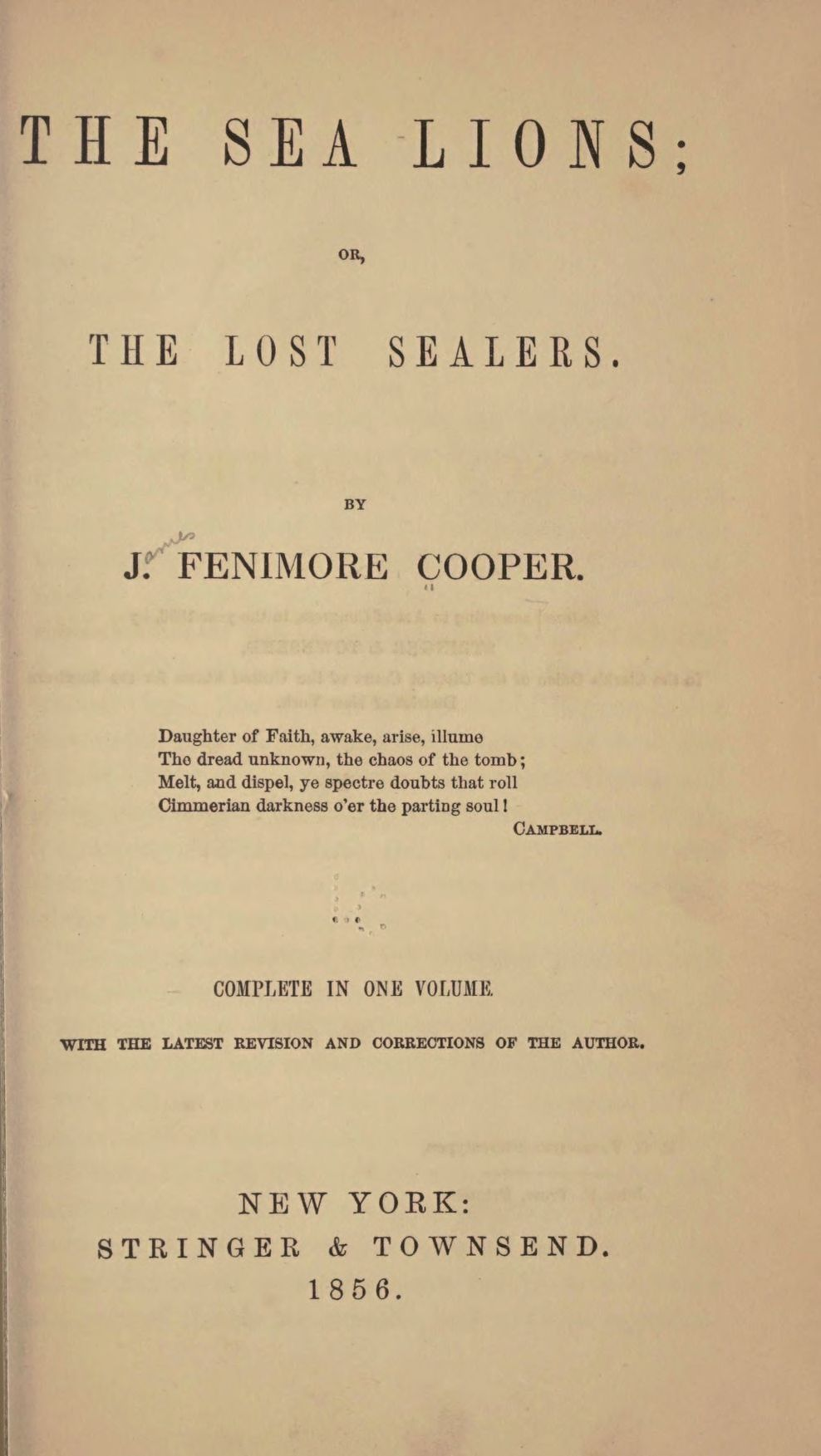
- Title page of 1856 edition
- Author: James Fenimore Cooper
- Genre: sea novel
- Publisher: Stringer & Townsend (in two volumes)
- Publication date: 1849

The Sea Lions; Or, The Lost Sealers is an 1849 sea novel by James Fenimore Cooper. The plot revolves around two sealers stranded in the Antarctic ice. The novel was first published in two volumes, by Stringer & Townsend. Critic W.B. Gates described the novel as taking inspiration from Charles Wilkes's Narrative of the United States Exploring Expedition of the Years 1838-1842.

Herman Melville reviewed the novel in 1849 for the magazine The Literary World. Melville's praise for the novel focuses on the action and adventure of the novel, saying, "Upon the whole, we warmly recommend the Sea Lions; and even those who more for fashion’s sake than anything else, have of late joined in decrying our national novelist, will in this last work, perhaps, recognise one of his happiest."

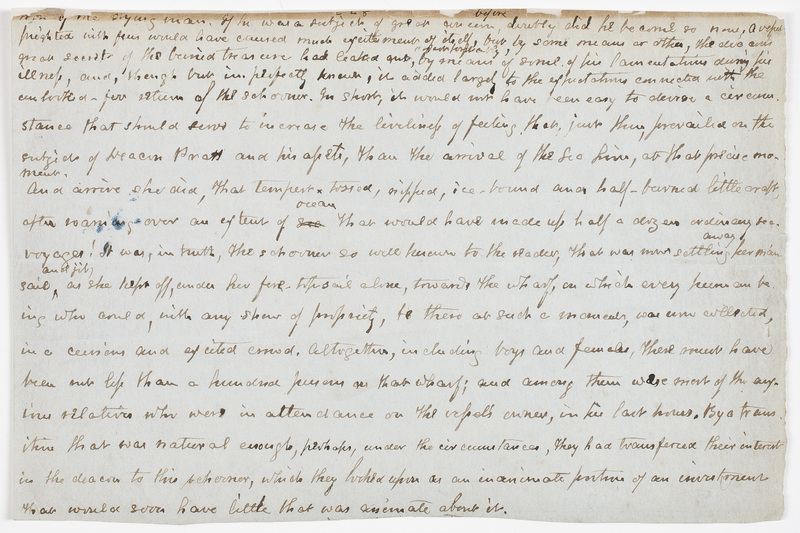
Fragment of The Sea Lions manuscript (1848)
