= The Pathfinder, or The Inland Sea =

1840 historical novel by James Fenimore Cooper

- Author: James Fenimore Cooper
- Language: English
- Publication date: 1840

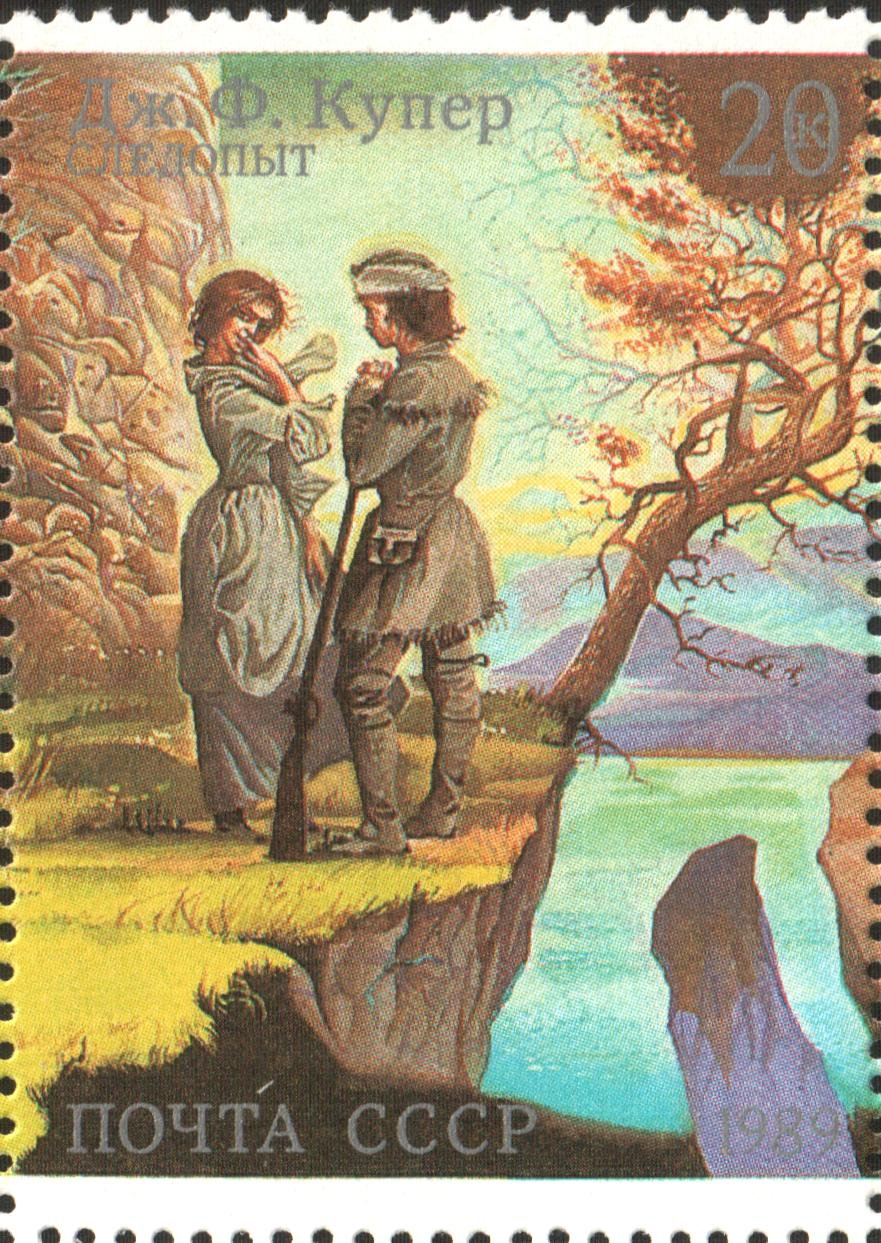
The Pathfinder (Soviet stamp for the 200th anniversary of J. F. Cooper, 1989)

The Pathfinder, or The Inland Sea is a historical novel by American author James Fenimore Cooper, first published in 1840. It is the fourth novel Cooper wrote featuring Natty Bumppo, his fictitious frontier hero, and the third chronological episode of the Leatherstocking Tales. The inland sea of the title is Lake Ontario.

== Composition ==
The Pathfinder was written 13 years after Natty Bumppo had ended his career in The Prairie. Cooper had questioned the wisdom of reviving this hero, and he was at the time engaged in fierce litigations with newspapers. The adventures of the plot on the water take authority from the fact that Cooper had as midshipman actually seen service on Lake Ontario.

== Plot ==
The Pathfinder shows Natty at his old trick of guiding tender damsels through the dangerous woods, and the siege at the blockhouse and the storm on Lake Ontario are considerably like other of Cooper's sieges and storms. Natty, in this novel commonly called the Pathfinder, keeps in a hardy middle age his simple and honest nature, which is severely tested by his love for a nineteen-year-old young woman, Mabel Dunham. She is a conventional heroine of romance. A certain soft amiability about her turns for a time all the thoughts of the scout to the world of domestic affections. More talkative than ever before, he reveals new mental and moral traits. With the same touch of realism which had kept Uncas and Cora apart in The Last of the Mohicans, Cooper separates these lovers, and sends Natty's romantic interest to the arms of a younger suitor, restoring the hero to his home in the wilderness.

== Distinctions ==
It is the only book in the Leatherstocking series to show Natty Bumppo in love, and the first of Cooper's books which made important imaginative use of the Great Lakes. The sobriquet "The Pathfinder" was subsequently attached to explorer John C. Frémont.

== Adaptations ==
=== Film ===
- 1952: The Pathfinder.
- 1987: The Pathfinder.

=== TV ===
- 1969: The Leatherstocking Tales, Part 3 - The fort on the Beaver flow (Die Lederstrumpferzählungen Tail 3 - Das Fort am Biberfluss). 4 parts Germany-France series.
- 1973: Hawkeye, the Pathfinder, 5-part BBC miniseries with Paul Massie as Hawkeye, John Abineri as Chingachgook and Patrick Troughton.
- 1984: The Leatherstocking Tales, Part 4, 4-part PBS miniseries with Cliff DeYoung as Hawkeye and Roger Hill as Chingachgook.
- 1996: The Pathfinder, TV-film.
