= Afloat and Ashore =

1844 novel by James Fenimore Cooper

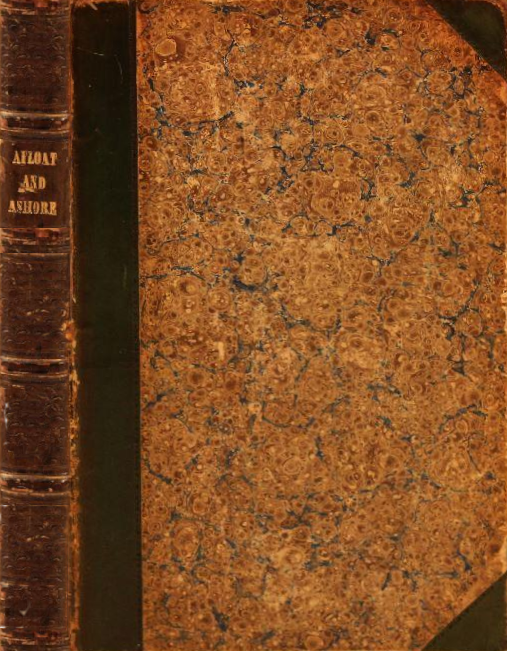
- Author: James Fenimore Cooper
- Original title: Afloat and Ashore; or, The Adventures of Miles Wallingford: A Sea Tale
- Language: English
- Genre: Nautical fiction
- Published: 1844
- Followed by: Miles Wallingford: Sequel to Afloat and Ashore

Afloat and Ashore is a nautical fiction novel by James Fenimore Cooper first published in 1844. Set in 1796–1804, the novel follows the maritime adventures of Miles Wallingford Jr., the son of wealthy New York landowners who chooses to go to sea after the death of his parents. The novel ends abruptly part way through, and is followed by what critic Harold D. Langely called a "necessary" sequel which resolves many thematic and plot elements. The novel is partially autobiographical, based in part on Cooper's own experiences as a sailor, and is his first full-length novel to fully employ a first-person narrative.

== Themes ==
Thematically, the novel focuses on the challenging relationship between Miles and Neb, a runaway slave who stows away aboard the ship and only is left unpunished when Miles claims him as his own slave. The two become close allies aboard the ship, but the racial and power differences between Miles, who becomes a petty officer aboard the vessel, and Neb, who is confined to the role of regular seaman.

== Genre and setting ==
In her critical introduction to the novel published at the end of the 19th century, Susan Fenimore Cooper described the novel as autobiographical fiction, drawing on Cooper's experiences growing up in New York, and his experiences with the sea. Critic Thomas Philbrick attributes Cooper's turn to autobiographical experience as inspiration, to a five-month visit by an old shipmate, Ned Myers, which led Cooper to create the biography Ned Myers; or, A Life before the Mast (1843) However, despite Philbrick claiming that the novel is the most autobiographical of Cooper's novels, he notes that "those autobiographical materials in fact make up only a small proportion of the total fabric".

Susan Fenimore Cooper points out Cooper's "truthfully sketched, and tinged with the peculiar coloring of the period" depiction of nautical life, drawn from extensive research with sailors living during the period in which its set. Similarly, she notes the contrast between Cooper's earlier nautical fiction like The Pilot, which focuses on the experience of one ship and crew, noting the diversity of vessels and maritime communities depicted. Critic Thomas Philbrick, also notes the importance of historical realism in the novel. He describes the novel being much more realistic largely because of Coopers work on his History of the Navy, as compared to the earlier nautical fiction, like The Pilot (1824), The Red Rover (1827), and The Water-Witch (1830), which treat history and ocean with much more romantic and metaphorical, akin to other Romantic treatments of the sea. Similarly, Philbrick describes Afloat and Ashore as a return to Cooper's interest in the American context, whereas many of his novels in the 10 years before were drawn from European history or the European nautical tradition.
