= Miles Wallingford =

Novel by James Fenimore Cooper

Miles Wallingford: Sequel to Afloat and Ashore
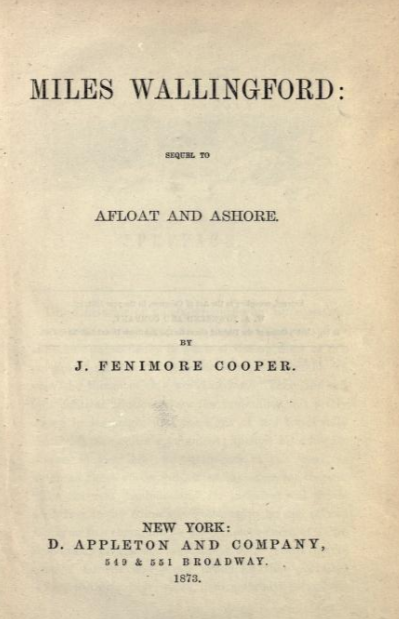
- Title page for Miles Wallingford: Sequel to Afloat and Ashore (1873 edition)
- Author: James Fenimore Cooper
- Original title: Miles Wallingford: Sequel to Afloat and Ashore
- Language: English
- Genre: Nautical fiction
- Published: 1844
- Preceded by: Afloat and Ashore; or, The Adventures of Miles Wallingford. A Sea Tale

Miles Wallingford: Sequel to Afloat and Ashore is an 1844 nautical novel written by American writer James Fenimore Cooper.

== Background ==
The novel by Cooper was completed in 1844 in New York, under the title Miles Wallingford: Sequel to Afloat and Ashore and released in the UK as Lucy Hardinge: A Second Series of Afloat and Ashore.

It is the sequel to Cooper's 1844 novel, Afloat and Ashore; or, The Adventures of Miles Wallingford. A Sea Tale.

== Plot ==
Set in Ulster County between 1795 and 1805, the novel follows the adventures of Capt. Miles Wallingford Jr., marked by seafaring exploits, intrigue, and romance.
