= William Cardell =

American writer (1780–1828)

William Samuel Cardell (November 27, 1780 – August 10, 1828) was an early American fiction writer and scholar.

He is best remembered for his sea stories for boys, which combined adventure tales with moral instruction. The Story of Jack Halyard, the Sailor Boy (1824) was the most famous of these; others were Jack Halyard and Ishmael Bardus and Jack Lawrence, or the Adventures of a Cabin Boy. Cardell produced abundant fiction for younger readers, with titles like The Moral Monitor and The Orphans: an American Tale Addressed Chiefly to the Young. He was a significant figure in the evolution of American children's literature.

In his own generation Cardell had a reputation as a grammarian and an educational reformer. He wrote Elements of English Grammar, Philosophical Grammar of the English Language, and The Analytical Spelling Book, among other titles. He was the founder of the short-lived American Academy of Language and Belles Lettres (1820–22). Cardell advocated a democratic approach to the English language as opposed to British traditionalism; his correspondents included James Madison and John Quincy Adams.

Cardell was educated at Williams College. He was the only child of Apphia Hyde and Captain Samuel Cardell, the latter a ship's captain from New London who was lost at sea during action in the American Revolutionary War, on 13 January 1781. Apphia Hyde Cardell later remarried Benjamin Walworth and raised a second family. Reuben H. Walworth was a child of Benjamin Walworth and Apphia Hyde Cardell Walworth, and a half brother of William S. Cardell.
