= The Wreck of the Grosvenor =

Novel by William Clark Russell

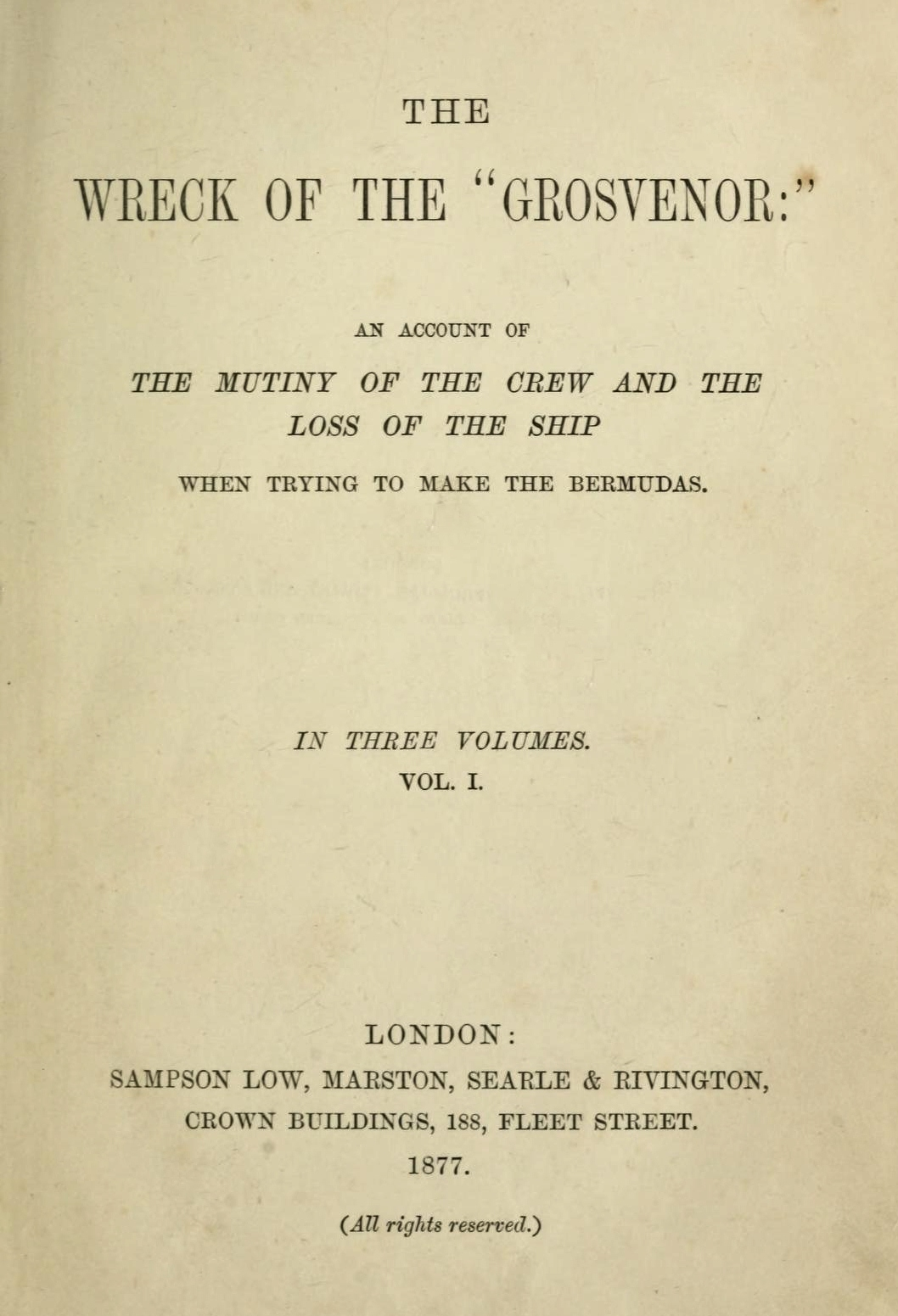
First edition title page

The Wreck of the Grosvenor (1877) is a nautical novel by William Clark Russell first published in 3 volumes by Sampson Low. According to John Sutherland, it was "the most popular mid-Victorian melodrama of adventure and heroism at sea." It remained popular and widely read in illustrated editions well into the first half of the 20th century. It was Russell's best selling and most well known novel. Russell noted in a preface, the novel 'found its first and best welcome in the United States.'

The novel was published nearly a century after the actual Wreck of the Grosvenor, in 1782; coincidentally the novel has the same name but is otherwise unrelated.
