= Nautical fiction =

Literary genre

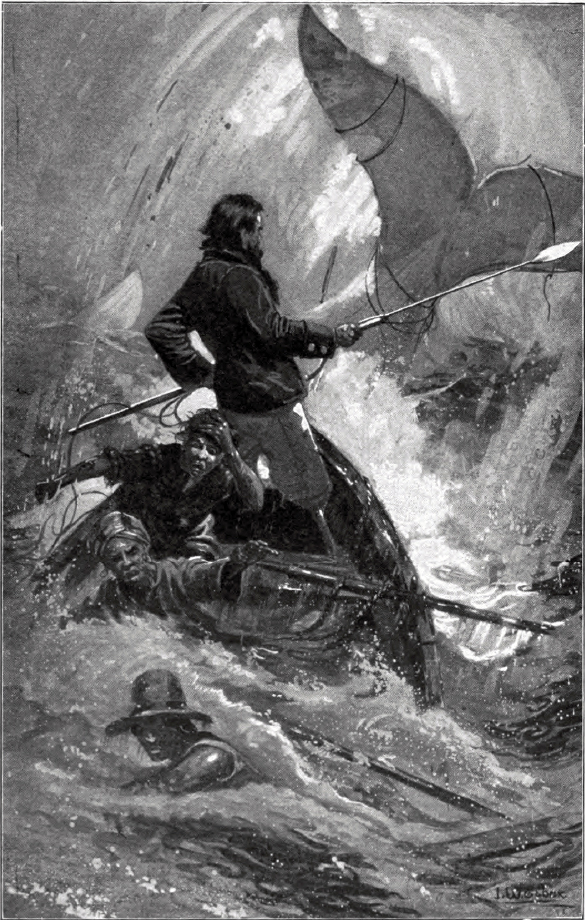
An illustration from a 1902 printing of Moby-Dick, one of the renowned American sea novels

Nautical fiction, frequently also naval fiction, sea fiction, naval adventure fiction or maritime fiction, is a genre of literature with a setting on or near the sea, that focuses on the human relationship to the sea and sea voyages and highlights nautical culture in these environments. The settings of nautical fiction vary greatly, including merchant ships, liners, naval ships, fishing vessels, life boats, etc., along with sea ports and fishing villages. When describing nautical fiction, scholars most frequently refer to novels, novellas, and short stories, sometimes under the name of sea novels or sea stories. These works are sometimes adapted for the theatre, film and television.

The development of nautical fiction follows with the development of the English language novel and while the tradition is mainly British and North American, there are also significant works from literatures in Japan, France, Scandinavia, and other Western traditions. Though the treatment of themes and settings related to the sea and maritime culture is common throughout the history of western literature, nautical fiction, as a distinct genre, was first pioneered by James Fenimore Cooper (The Pilot, 1824) and Frederick Marryat (Frank Mildmay, 1829 and Mr Midshipman Easy 1836) in the early 19th century. There were 18th century and earlier precursors that have nautical settings, but few are as richly developed as subsequent works in this genre. The genre has evolved to include notable literary works like Herman Melville's Moby-Dick (1851), Joseph Conrad's Lord Jim (1899–1900), popular fiction like C.S. Forester's Hornblower series (1937–67), and works by authors that straddle the divide between popular and literary fiction, like Patrick O'Brian's Aubrey-Maturin series (1970–2004).

Because of the historical dominance of nautical culture by men, they are usually the central characters, except for works that feature ships carrying women passengers. For this reason, nautical fiction is often marketed for men. Nautical fiction usually includes distinctive themes, such as a focus on masculinity and heroism, investigations of social hierarchies, and the psychological struggles of the individual in the hostile environment of the sea. Stylistically, readers of the genre expect an emphasis on adventure, accurate representation of maritime culture, and use of nautical language. Works of nautical fiction may be romances, such as historical romance, fantasy, and adventure fiction, and also may overlap with the genres of war fiction, children's literature, travel narratives (such as the Robinsonade), the social problem novel and psychological fiction.

== Definition ==
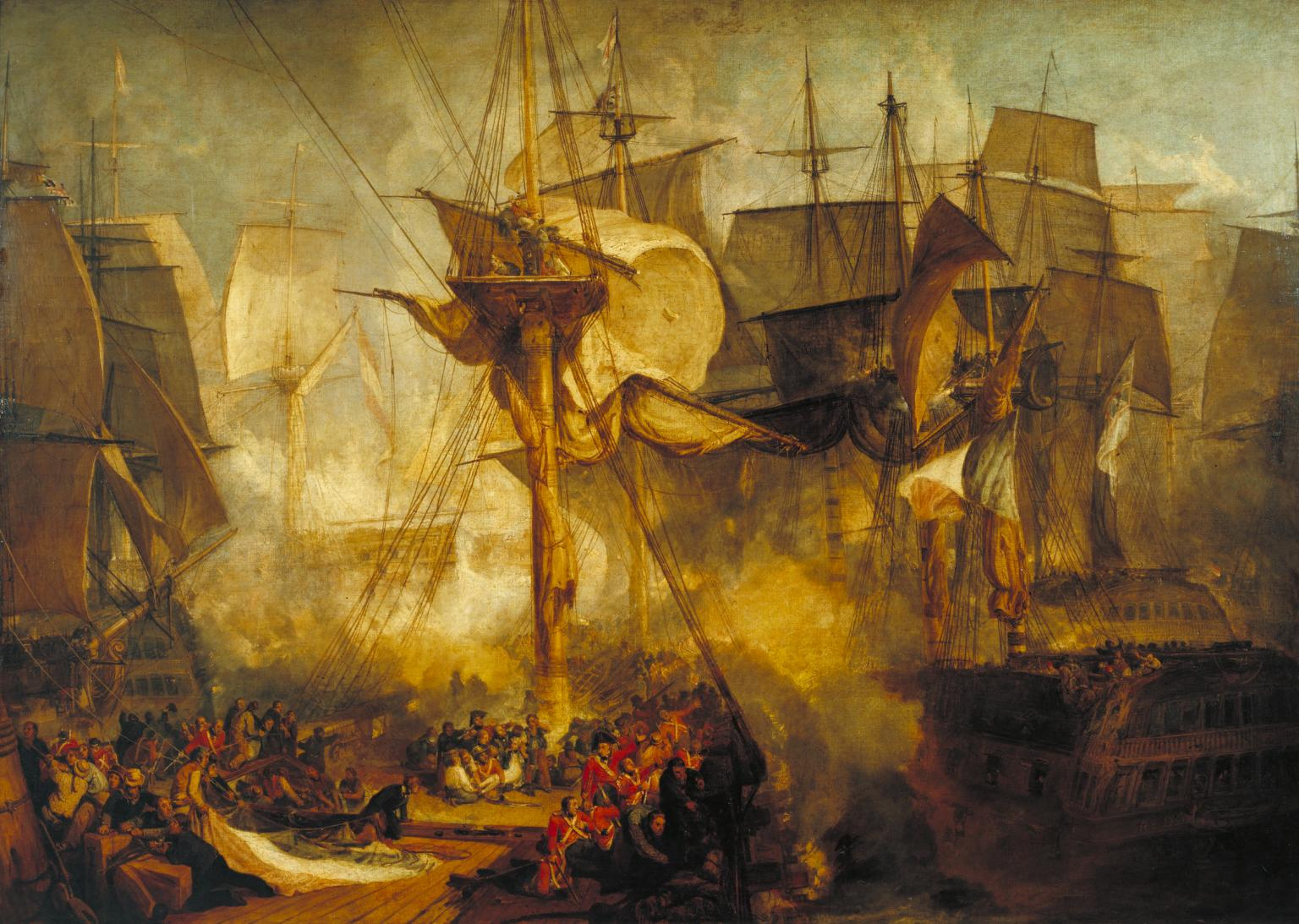
J. M. W. Turner, The Battle of Trafalgar (circa. 1806). Turner's seascapes reflect the Romantic movement's new attitude to the sea

What constitutes nautical fiction or sea fiction, and their constituent naval, nautical or sea novels, depends largely on the focus of the commentator. Conventionally sea fiction encompasses novels in the vein of Marryat, Conrad, Melville, Forester and O'Brian: novels which are principally set on the sea, and immerse the characters in nautical culture. Typical sea stories follow the narrative format of "a sailor embarks upon a voyage; during the course of the voyage he is tested – by the sea, by his colleagues or by those that he encounters upon another shore; the experience either makes him or breaks him".

Some scholars chose to expand the definition of what constitutes nautical fiction. However, these are inconsistent definitions: some like Bernhard Klein, choose to expand that definition into a thematic perspective, he defines his collection "Fictions of the Sea" around a broader question of the "Britain and the Sea" in literature, which comes to include 16th and 17th maritime instructional literature, and fictional depictions of the nautical which offer lasting cultural resonance, for example Milton's Paradise Lost and Coleridge's "The Rime of the Ancient Mariner". Choosing not to fall into this wide of a definition, but also opting to include more fiction than just that which is explicitly about the sea, John Peck opts for a broader maritime fiction, which includes works like Jane Austen's Mansfield Park (1814) and George Eliot's Daniel Deronda (1876), that depict cultural situations dependent on the maritime economy and culture, without explicitly exploring the naval experience. However, as critic Luis Iglasius notes, when defending the genesis of the sea novel genre by James Fenimore Cooper, expanding this definition includes work "tend[ing] to view the sea from the perspective of the shore" focusing on the effect of a nautical culture on the larger culture or society ashore or focusing on individuals not familiar with nautical life.

This article focuses on the sea/nautical novel and avoids broader thematic discussions of nautical topics in culture. In so doing, this article highlights what critics describe as the more conventional definition for the genre, even when they attempt to expand its scope.

== History ==
There I heard nothing
but the roaring sea,
the ice-cold wave.
At times the swan's song
I took to myself as pleasure,
the gannet's noise
and the voice of the curlew
instead of the laughter of men,
the singing gull
instead of the drinking of mead.
Storms there beat the stony cliffs,
where the tern spoke,
icy-feathered;

— from the Old English poem The Seafarer.

Sea narratives have a long history of development, arising from cultures with genres of adventure and travel narratives that profiled the sea and its cultural importance, for example Homer's epic poem the Odyssey, the Old English poem The Seafarer, the Icelandic Saga of Eric the Red (c.1220–1280), or early European travel narratives like Richard Hakluyt's (c. 1552–1616) Voyages (1589). Then during the 18th century, as Bernhard Klein notes in defining "sea fiction" for his scholarly collection on sea fiction, European cultures began to gain an appreciation of the "sea" through varying thematic lenses. First because of the economic opportunities brought by the sea and then through the influence of the Romantic movement. As early as 1712 Joseph Addison identified "the sea as an archetype of the Sublime in nature: 'of all the objects that I have ever seen, there is none which affects my imagination as much as the sea or ocean' ". Later in this century Samuel Taylor Coleridge's narrative poem Rime of the Ancient Mariner (1798), developed the idea of the ocean as "realm of unspoiled nature and a refuge from the perceived threats of civilization". However, it is Byron "who has taken most of the credit for inventing the nineteenth-century sea, in Childe Harold's Pilgrimage (1812–16):

There is a pleasure in the pathless woods,
There is a rapture on the lonely shore,
There is society where none intrudes,
By the deep Sea and music in its roar.

=== Early sea novels ===
A distinct sea novel genre, which focuses on representing nautical culture exclusively, did not gain traction until the early part of the 19th century. However, works dealing with life at sea had been written in the 18th century. These include works dealing with piracy, such as Daniel Defoe's Captain Singleton (1720), and A General History of the Pyrates (1724), which contains biographies of several notorious pirates such as Blackbeard and Bartholomew Roberts.

Tobias Smollett's The Adventures of Roderick Random, published in 1748, is a picaresque novel partially based on Smollett's experience as a naval-surgeon's mate in the British Navy.

=== 19th century ===
Jonathan Raban suggests that it was the Romantic movement, and especially Byron, which made "the sea the proper habit for aspiring authors", including the two most prominent early sea fiction writers James Fenimore Cooper and Captain Frederick Marryat, both of whose maritime adventure novels began to define generic expectations about such fiction. Critic Margaret Cohen describes Cooper's The Pilot as the first sea novel and Marryat's adaptation of that style, as continuing to "pioneer" the genre. Critic Luis Iglesias says that novels and fiction that involved the sea before these two authors "tend to view the sea from the perspective of the shore," focusing on the effect of nautical culture on the larger culture or society ashore and individuals not familiar with nautical life; by example Iglesias points to how Jane Austen's novels don't represent the genre, because, though the sea plays a prominent part in their plots, they keeps actual sea-culture as a "peripheral presence." Similarly, Iglesias describes earlier English novels like Robinson Crusoe (1719), Moll Flanders (1722), and Roderick Random (1748) as populating the naval world with characters unfamiliar with the sea to better understand land-bound society, not fulfilling the immersive generic expectations of nautical fiction. Following the development of the genre's motifs and characteristics in works like those of Cooper and Marryat, a number of notable European novelists explored the genre, such as Eugène Sue, Edouard Corbière, Frederick Chamier and William Glasgock.

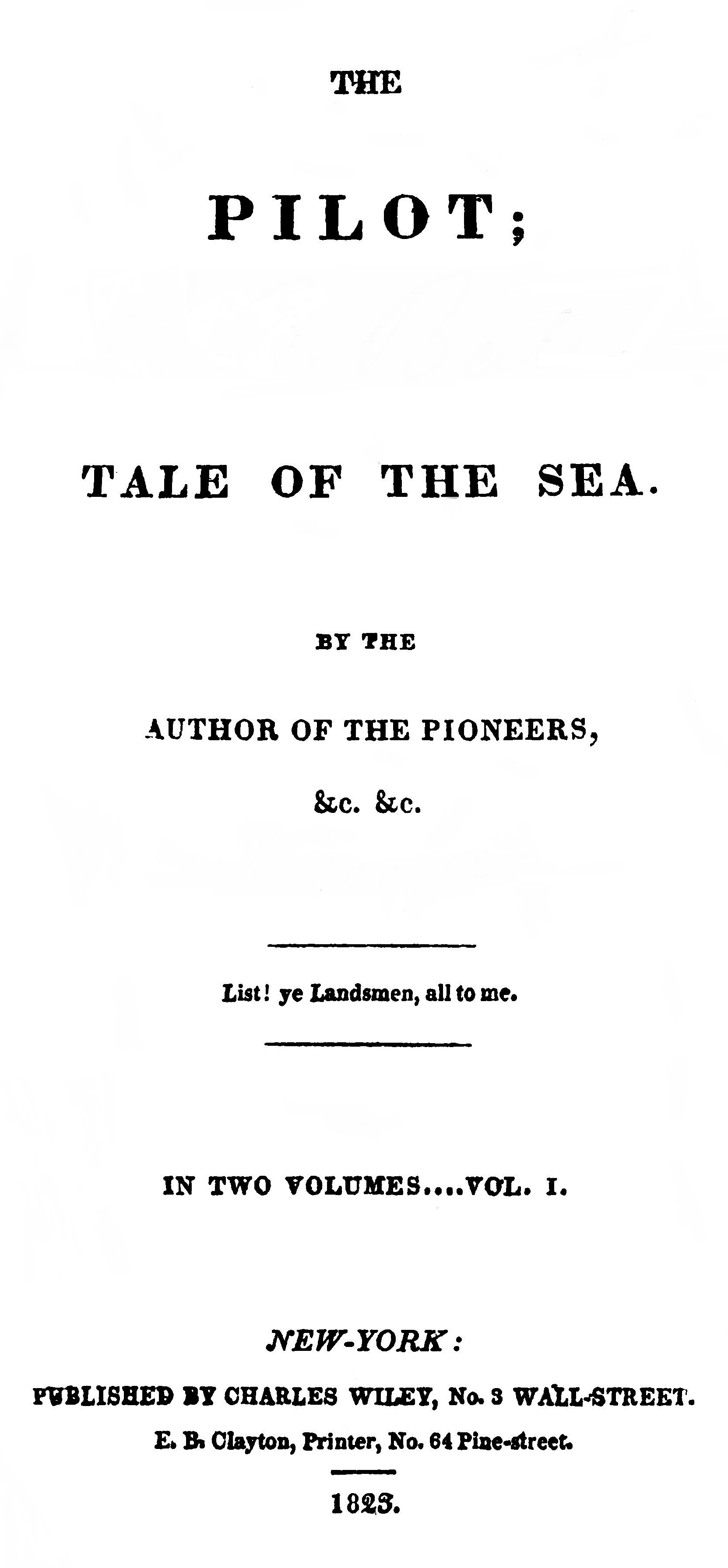
The original cover of Cooper's The Pilot, printed in 1823.

James Fenimore Cooper wrote what is often described as the first sea novel, (Note: This is a debatable claim, dependent on the limitations placed on the genre, per the discussion in the definition section. Margaret Cohen, for example, states that "[a]fter a seventy-five year hiatus, the maritime novel was reinvented by James Fenimore Cooper, with the Pilot". The Novel and the Sea. Princeton: Princeton University Press, 2010, p. 133.) The Pilot (1824), in response to Walter Scott's The Pirate (1821). Cooper was frustrated with the inaccuracy of the depiction of nautical culture in that book. Though critical of The Pirate, Cooper borrowed many of the stylistic and thematic elements of the historical fiction genre developed by Walter Scott, such as a desire "to map the boundaries and identity of the nation." In both The Pilot and the subsequent The Red Rover (1827) Cooper explores the development of an American national identity. In the later work Afloat and Ashore (1844) he examines this subject again, as well as offering a critique of American politics. Cooper's novels created an interest in sea novels in the United States, and led both Edgar Allan Poe (with The Narrative of Arthur Gordon Pym) and mass-market novelists like Lieutenant Murray Ballou to write novels in the genre. The prominence of the genre also influenced non-fiction. Critic John Peck describes Richard Henry Dana's Two Years Before the Mast (1840) as utilizing a similar style and addressing the same thematic issues of national and masculine identity as nautical fiction developing after Cooper's pioneering works.

Fenimore Cooper greatly influenced the French novelist Eugène Sue (1804 –1857), his naval experiences supplying much of the material for Sue's first novels, Kernock le pirate (1830), Atar-Gull (1831), the "widely admired" La Salamandre (1832), La Coucaratcha (1832–1834), and others, which were composed at the height of the Romantic movement. The more famous French novelist Alexandre Dumas (1802–1870) "made no secret of his admiration for Cooper" and wrote Le Capitaine Paul (1838) as a sequel to Cooper's Pilot. Another French novelist who had a seafarer background was Edouard Corbière (1793–1875), the author of numerous maritime novels, including Les Pilotes de l'Iroise (1832), and Le Négrier, aventures de mer, (1834).

In Britain, the genesis of a nautical fiction tradition is often attributed to Frederick Marryat. Marryat's career as a novelist stretched from 1829 until his death in 1848, with many of his works set at sea, including Mr Midshipman Easy. Adapting Cooper's approach to fiction, Marryat's sea novels also reflected his own experience in the Royal Navy during the Napoleonic Wars, in part under the command of Thomas Cochrane—who would also later inspire Patrick O'Brian's character Jack Aubrey. Thematically, Marryat focuses on ideas of heroism, proper action of officers, and reforms within the culture of the navy. His literary works form part of a larger British cultural examination of maritime service during the early part of the 19th century, where subjects such as naval discipline and naval funding were in widespread public debate. Peck describes Marryat's novels as consistent in their core thematic focuses on masculinity and the contemporary naval culture, and in doing so, he suggests, they provide reflection on "a complex historical moment in which author, in his clumsy way, engages with rapid change in Britain." Marryat's novels encouraged the writing of other novels by veterans of the Napoleonic Wars during the 1830s, like M. H. Baker, Captain Chamier, Captain Glascock, Edward Howard, and William J. Neale; these authors frequently both reflect on and defend the public image of the navy. Novels by these authors highlight a more conservative and supportive view of the navy, unlike texts from those interested in reforming the navy, like Nautical Economy; or forecastle recollections of events during the last war, which were critical of naval disciplinary practices, during a period when public debates ensued around various social and political reform movements. However, Marryat's novels tend to be treated as unique in this regard; Peck argues that Marryat's novels, though in part supportive of the navy, also highlight a "disturbing dimension" thereof.

=== Late 19th century ===
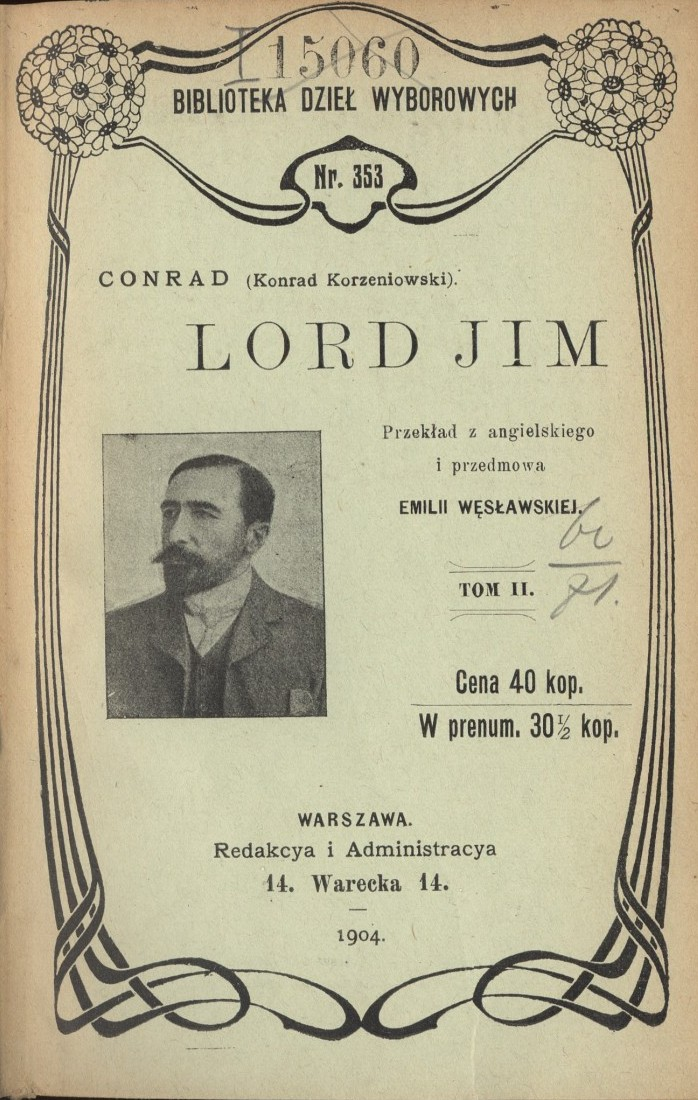
The Polish cover to Joseph Conrad's 1904 novel Lord Jim

As the model of the sea novel solidified into a distinct genre, writers in both Europe and the United States produced major works of literature in the genre, for example Melville's Moby-Dick, Victor Hugo's Toilers of the Sea and Joseph Conrad's Heart of Darkness and Lord Jim. John Peck describes Herman Mellville and Joseph Conrad as the "two great English-language writers of sea stories": better novelists than predecessors Cooper and Marryat, both flourished writing in the "adventure novel" genre. Moreover, unlike the earlier novels, which were written during a thriving nautical economic boom, full of opportunities and affirmation of national identity, novels by these authors were written "at a point where a maritime based economic order [was] disintegrating." The genre also inspired a number of popular mass-market authors, like American Ned Buntline, British Charles Kingsley and Frenchman Jules Verne.

Mellville's fiction frequently involves the sea, with his first five novels following the naval adventures of seamen, often a pair of male friends (Typee (1846), Omoo (1847), Mardi (1849), Redburn (1849) and White-Jacket (1850)). Moby-Dick is his most important work, sometimes called the Great American Novel, it was also named "the greatest book of the sea ever written" by D.H. Lawrence. In this work, the hunting of a whale by Captain Ahab immerses the narrator, Ishmael, in a spiritual journey, a theme also featured in Conrad's much later Heart of Darkness.

The importance of naval power in maintaining Britains' vast worldwide empire led to numerous novels with nautical themes. Some of these just touch on the sea, as with Sylvia's Lovers (1863) by Elizabeth Gaskell, where the nautical world is a foil to the social life ashore. However, British novelists increasingly focused on the sea in the 19th century, particularly when they wrote about the upper classes. In such works sea voyages became a place for strong social commentary, as, for example Anthony Trollope's John Caldigate (1877), in which he depicts a character traveling to Australia to make his fortune, and Wilkie Collins's Armadale (1866), which follows gentlemen yachting. Likewise William Clark Russell's novels, especially the first two, John Holdsworth, Chief Mate (1875) and The Wreck of the Grosvenor (1877), both highlight the social anxieties of Victorian Britain.

At the same time that literary works embraced the sea narrative in Britain, so did the most popular novels of adventure fiction, of which Marryat is a major example. Critic John Peck emphasizes this subgenre's impact on boys' books. In these novels young male characters go through—often morally whitewashed—experiences of adventure, romantic entanglement, and "domestic commitment". Charles Kingsley is the most definitive writer of this genre, writing over one hundred boys' books, "many with a maritime theme", including Westward Ho!. Other authors include R. M. Ballantyne, The Coral Island (1858), G.A. Henty, Under Drake's Flag (1882), Robert Louis Stevenson, Treasure Island (1883), and Rudyard Kipling, Captains Courageous (1897), all of which were also read by adults, and helped expand the potential of naval adventure fiction. Other novels by Stevenson, including Kidnapped, Catriona, The Master of Ballantrae, and The Ebb-Tide (co-authored with Lloyd Osbourne) have significant scenes aboard ships.

=== The 20th and 21st centuries ===
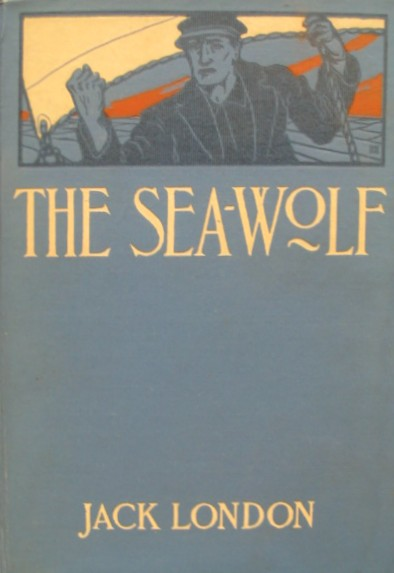
The first edition cover of Jack London's The Sea Wolf (1904)

Twentieth century novelists expand on the earlier traditions. The modernist Joseph Conrad drew inspiration from a range of earlier nautical works like Victor Hugo's Toilers of the Sea (1866), and Leopold McClintock's book about his 1857–59 expeditions in search of Sir John Franklin's lost ships, as well as works by James Fenimore Cooper and Frederick Marryat. Most of Conrad's works draw directly from this seafaring career: Conrad had a career in both the French and British merchant marine, climbing to the rank of captain. His most famous novel, Heart of Darkness (1899), is based on his journey on the Congo River on the Roi des Belges. His other nautical fiction includes An Outcast of the Islands (1896) The Nigger of the 'Narcissus' (1897), Lord Jim (1900), Typhoon (1902), Chance (1913), The Rescue (1920), The Rover (1923).

A number of other novelists started writing nautical fiction early in the century. Jack London's The Sea Wolf (1904), was influenced by Kipling's recently published Captains Courageous (1897). Welsh novelist Richard Hughes (1900–1976) wrote only four novels, the most famous of which is the pirate adventure, A High Wind in Jamaica. He also wrote In Hazard (1938) about a merchant ship caught in a hurricane. English poet and novelist John Masefield (1878–1967), who had himself served at sea, wrote The Bird of Dawning (1933), relating the adventures of the crew of a China tea clipper, who are forced to abandon ship and take to the boats.

The novels of two other prominent British sea novelists, C.S. Forester (1899–1966) and Patrick O'Brian (1914–2000), define the conventional boundaries of contemporary naval fiction. A number of later authors draw on Forester's and O'Brian's models of representing individual officers or sailors as they progress through their careers in the British navy, including Alexander Kent and Dudley Pope. Patrick O'Brian's Aubrey-Maturin series straddles the divide between popular and literary fiction, distinguishing itself from Hornblower, one reviewer even commented the books have "escaped the usual confines of naval adventure [. . .] attract[ing] new readers who wouldn’t touch Horatio Hornblower with a bargepole." There are also reviews that compare these works to Jane Austen and similar authors. though this is not a universally held opinion.

Several other notable authors, wrote contemporary to O'Brian and Forester, but expanded the boundaries of the genre. Nicholas Monsarrat's novel The Cruel Sea (1951) follows a young naval officer Keith Lockhart during World War II service aboard "small ships". Monsarrat's short-story collections H.M.S. Marlborough Will Enter Harbour (1949), and The Ship That Died of Shame (1959) previously made into a film of the same name, mined the same literary vein, and gained popularity by association with The Cruel Sea. Another important British novelist who wrote about life at sea was William Golding (1911–1993). His novel Pincher Martin (1956) records the delusions experienced by a drowning sailor in his last moments. Golding's postmodernist trilogy To the Ends of the Earth is about sea voyages to Australia in the early nineteenth century, and draws extensively on the traditions of Jane Austen, Joseph Conrad and Herman Melville, and is Golding's most extensive piece of historiographic metafiction.

Four of Arthur Ransome’s children's novels in the Swallows and Amazons series (published 1930–1947) involve sailing at sea (Peter Duck, We Didn't Mean To Go To Sea, Missee Lee and Great Northern?). The others are about sailing small boats in the Lake District or on the Norfolk Broads. Two short stories in Coots in the North are about sailing on a yacht in the Baltic: The Unofficial Side and Two Shorts and a Long.

Swedish novelist Frans G. Bengtsson became widely known for his Viking saga novel Röde Orm (The Long Ships), published in two parts in 1941 and 1945. The hero Orm, later called Röde Orm (Red Snake) because of his red beard, is kidnapped as a boy onto a raiding ship and leads an exciting life in the Mediterranean area around the year 1000 AD. Later, he makes an expedition eastward into what is now Russia. The Long Ships was later adapted into a film.

Authors continue writing nautical fiction in the twenty-first century, including, for example, another Scandinavian, Danish novelist Carsten Jensen's (1952–) epic novel We, the drowned (2006) describes life on both sea and land from the beginning of the Danish-Prussian War in 1848 to the end of World War II. The novel focuses on the Danish seaport of Marstal, on the island of Ærø, and voyages by the town's seamen all over the globe.

== Common themes ==
=== Masculinity and heroism ===
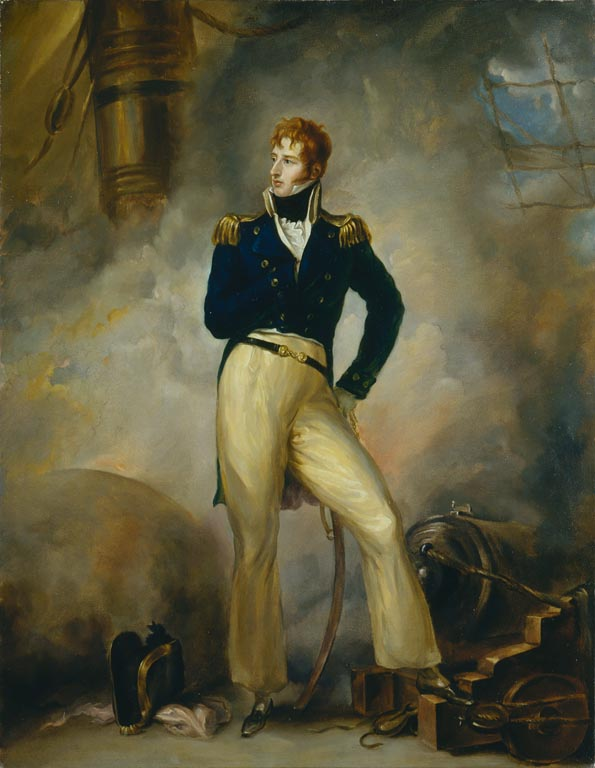
A portrait of Lord Cochrane in 1807 by Peter Edward Stroehling. Cochrane is frequently a historical model for the kinds of heroism depicted in fiction set during the Napoleonic wars and Age of Sail.

Those nautical novels dealing with life on naval and merchant ships set in the past are often written by men and deal with a purely male world with the rare exception, and a core themes found in these novels is male heroism. This creates a generic expectation among readers and publishers. Critic Jerome de Groot identifies naval historical fiction, like Forester's and O'Brian's, as epitomizing the kinds of fiction marketed to men, and nautical fiction being one of the subgenre's most frequently marketed towards men. As John Peck notes, the genre of nautical fiction frequently relies on a more "traditional models of masculinity", where masculinity is a part of a more conservative social order.

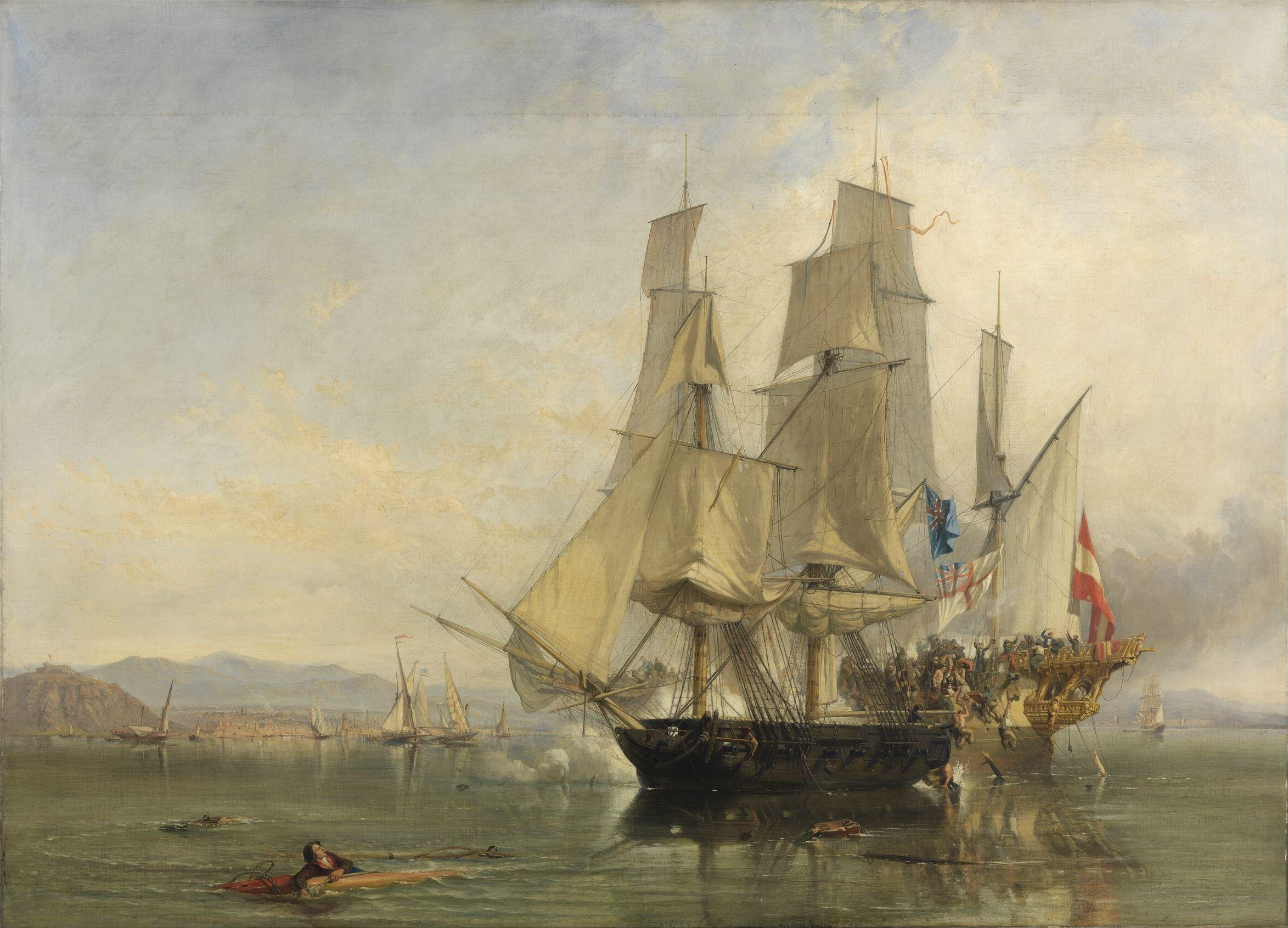
The painting The Action and Capture of the Spanish Xebeque Frigate El Gamo by Clarkson Frederick Stanfield illustrates one of the most famous battles by Lord Cochrane, (Note: The British brig-sloop Speedy's defeat of the Spanish xebec-frigate El Gamo on 6 May 1801, generally regarded as one of the most remarkable single-ship actions in naval history, founded the legendary reputation of the Speedy's commander, Lord Cochrane (later Admiral Thomas Cochrane, 10th Earl of Dundonald, GCB).) which has been fictionalized by several nautical fiction authors; most famously Patrick O'Brian's first Aubrey-Maturin novel Master and Commander is based largely on Cochranes exploits in the action, and the character Jack Aubrey's heroic character is established through his similarities to Cochrane.

However, as the genre has developed, models of masculinity and the nature of male heroism in sea novels vary greatly, despite being based on similar historical precedents like Thomas Cochrane (nicknamed the "Sea Wolf"), whose heroic exploits have been adapted by Marryat, Forestor, and O'Brian, among others. Susan Bassnet maps a change in the major popular nautical works. On the one hand Marryat's heroes focus on gentlemanly characteristics modeled on idealized ideas of actual captains such as Thomas Cochrane and Horatio Nelson. On the other hand, Forester's Hornblower is a model hero, presenting bravery, but inadequate at life ashore and beyond the navy and with limited emotional complexity. More recently O'Brian has explored complex ideas about masculinities through his characters Jack Aubrey and Stephen Maturin's friendship, along with the tension between naval life and shore life, and these men's complex passions and character flaws. Bassnett argues, these models of manliness frequently reflect the historical contexts in which authors write. Marryat's model is a direct political response to the reforms of the Navy and the Napoleonic Wars, while Forester is writing about post-World War II Britain, and O'Brian is exploring the social and scholarly complexities of the later part of the 20th century. Like O'Brian's novels, other 20th century authors treat masculinity as a complex plurality, full of questions about the idea of maleness. For example, William Golding's To the Ends of the Earth trilogy, explores the complexities of what constitutes a stable and acceptable male role as the civilian main character is thrust into the militaristic world of the navy, and is forced to work out afresh his own ideas of manhood.

Though much of the tradition focuses on a militaristic storytelling, some of the prototypes of the genre focus on a commercial naval heritage but continue to highlight the role of masculinity and heroism with that tradition. For example, Iglesias describes Coopers novels and the subsequent novels in the American tradition growing out of "a distinctive attitude borne of commercial enterprise, confronting and ultimately superseding its Atlantic rival." Only one of his novels, The Two Admirals, describes order of battle. Yet, the investigation of masculinity is central to the novels; Critic Steven Hathorn describes "Cooper deliberately invests his nautical world with a masculine character, to such a degree that the appearance of women aboard ships presents an array of problems […] the novels explore how some of the biggest challenges to manhood come from within—from the very nature of masculinity itself." James Fenimore Cooper's The Pilot questions the role of nautical symbols of heroes of the revolutionary period, such as John Paul Jones, and their unsavory naval practices while privateering.

=== Women at sea ===
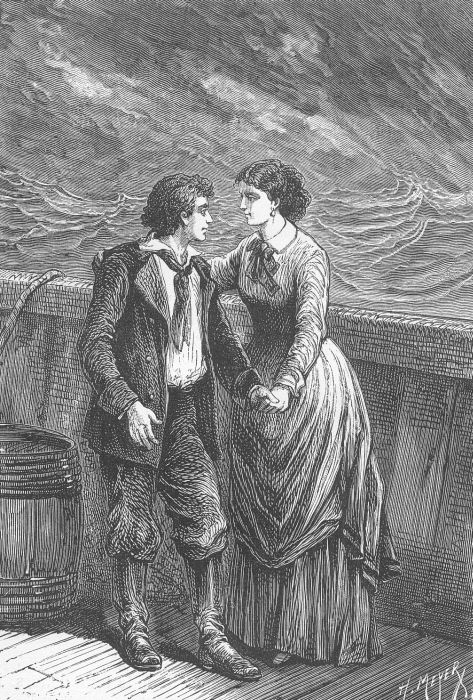
An illustration from Dick Sand, A Captain at Fifteen by Jules Verne, drawn by Henri Meyer. Mrs Weldon (pictured here) is the only woman aboard the main ship during the novel.

Although contemporary sea culture includes women working as fishers and even commanding naval ships, maritime fiction on the whole has not followed this cultural change. (Note: "Women in the Royal Navy serve in many roles; as pilots, observers and air-crew personnel; as divers, and Commanding Officers of HM Ships and shore establishments, notably Cdr Sarah West, who took up her appointment as CO of HMS PORTLAND in 2012, taking her ship from a refit in Rosyth to her current deployment as an Atlantic Patrol vessel. In another milestone for the Royal Navy, Commander Sue Moore was the first woman to command a squadron of minor war vessels; the First Patrol Boat Squadron (1PBS) ... Women can serve in the Royal Marines but not as RM Commandos." ; for women as crew in the fishing industry, see "Women in Fish harvesting") Generally, in maritime fiction, women only have a role on passenger ships, as wives of warrant officers, and where the plot is on land. An example of a woman aboard a ship is Joseph Conrad's Chance (1913), where in the final section Captain Anthony takes his younger bride to sea with him and the captain's "obsessive passion" disturbs "the normal working relations of the ship". James Hanley's Captain Bottell closely parallels Conrad's work, though here Captain Bottell's obsession is with a government official's wife. This causes him to descend into madness, leaving the crew struggling "heroically to keep the ship afloat" during a storm. Critic John Fordham sees Hanley's novel as "a conscious anti-romantic attack" on Chance.

There are, however, stories of women dressed as men serving at sea. In 1815, American Louisa Baker supposedly wrote The Female Marine; or the Adventures of Louisa Baker a narrative about her life aboard the USS Constitution as a warning to other young women. The book was widely read and accepted as fact, but historians now believe that Louisa Baker never existed, and that her story was created by publisher Nathaniel Coverly, Jr., and written by Nathan Hill Wright. The story was so popular that a sequel, The Adventures of Lucy Brown, was published. The success of this further inspired Nathaniel Coverly, Jr., to publish another tale of a female sailor, The Surprising Adventures of Almira Paul, in 1816. Again historians doubt that the book, which is full of fantastic adventure, danger, and romance, is really an autobiography of Almira Paul of Halifax, Nova Scotia, and what it is more likely is that the story was based on the lives of real women such as Hannah Snell and Mary Anne Talbot—women who defied convention to live life on their own terms. Star-Crossed (Alfred A. Knopf, 2006) by Linda Collison, and the subsequent Barbados Bound, Book 1 of the Patricia MacPherson Nautical Adventure Series is historical fiction, which were inspired by the documented occurrences of actual women who served aboard ship as men.

Early in the nineteenth century Captain Marryat's Frank Mildhay (1829) explores an important part of sailor's life ashore, their sexual encounters. John Peck, in Maritime Fiction comments that Frank's "encounters with prostitutes and a relationship with an actress resulting in a child are not what might be expected", that is he is not "the kind of honest lad', the kind of midshipmen portrayed by Jane Austen or "who well be at the centre of Marryat's Mr Midshipman Easy ". Peck further suggests that in "Marryat's navy there is" both "contempt for" and "fear of women".

The Saturday Evening Post in the late 1920s ran a series of short stories about "Tugboat Annie" Brennan, a widow who ran a tugboat and successfully competed for a share of the towboat business in Puget Sound. Annie and her crew also did some crime fighting and helped people caught in storms and floods. The series was extremely popular and there were two films and a television show that were based on it.

Harcourt published L.A. Meyer's Bloody Jack (2002), the first novel in the young adult fiction series set in the early 19th century centering around the titular character Mary (Jacky) Faber. The first adventure featured Jacky disguised as a cabin boy aboard a British naval ship. The eleven subsequent titles feature other maritime or river adventures, with reference to and direct inspiration from nautical culture, historical events and people, tall tales and classic nautical fiction.

=== The working class at sea ===
Until the 20th century nautical fiction focused on officer protagonists and John Peck suggests, that "the idea of the gentleman is absolutely central in maritime fiction". However, historically, the bulk of people aboard nautical voyages are common sailors, drawn from the working classes. An early, somewhat disapproving, portrait of ordinary seamen is found in Herman Melville's fourth novel Redburn: His First Voyage: Being the Sailor-boy Confessions and Reminiscences of the Son-of-a-Gentleman, in the Merchant Service, published in 1849, Melville's semi-autobiographical account of the adventures of a refined youth among coarse and brutal sailors and the seedier areas of Liverpool. In June 1839 Melville had signed aboard the merchant ship St. Lawrence as a "boy" (a green hand) for a cruise from New York to Liverpool. He returned on the same ship on the first of October, after five weeks in England. Joseph Conrad's novella The Nigger of the 'Narcissus' (1897) about a black sailor from the West Indies was first published in America as The Children of the Sea: A Tale of the Forecastle.

However, it was not until the twentieth century that sea stories "of men for'ard of the bridge" really developed, starting with American playwright Eugene O'Neill's SS Glencairn one act plays written 1913–17, and his full-length play The Hairy Ape (1922). The latter is an expressionist play about a brutish, unthinking laborer known as Yank as he searches for a sense of belonging in a world controlled by the rich. At first Yank feels secure as he stokes the engines of an ocean liner, and is highly confident in his physical power over the ship's engines, but later he undergoes a crisis of identity. O'Neill spent several years at sea, and he joined the Marine Transport Workers Union of the Industrial Workers of the World (IWW), which was fighting for improved living conditions for the working class utilizing quick "on the job" direct action. O'Neill was a major influence on a number of subsequent writers of nautical fiction, like James Hanley and George Garrett.

The 1930s saw the publication of a number of short stories and novels about life of seamen below deck, some written by adventure seekers from wealthy families, like Melville and O'Neill, and others from the working class, who had gone to sea out of necessity. Moneyed Malcolm Lowry was "driven to the docks in the family limousine", when he was eighteen to begin a voyage "as deck hand, cabin boy and ultimately a fireman's helper on a tramp steamer". From this experience as a common seaman came Lowry's novel Ultramarine (1933), a work influenced by Nordahl Grieg's The Ship Sails On and Conrad Aiken's Blue Voyage. Working class writers who describe experiences in the merchant navy include, James Hanley, Jim Phelan, George Garrett, John Sommerfield (They Die Young (1930),), Liam O'Flaherty and B. Traven.

Writing about the men below decks required a different approach. For example, James Hanley describes Traven's Death Ship (1934), as "the first real book about the lives for'ard of the bridge". The novel portrays what Hanley calls the "real, horrible, fantastic, but disgustingly true". Hanley's own early novel Boy has been described as "truly disturbing novel", and explores sexual abuse of a teenage youth aboard a cargo ship. According to Paul Lester the "opening pages of Jim Phelan's Ten-A-Pennry People, resembles Boy", and this novel continues with details of how life as a stoker "will destroy a man physically". George Garrett in his short stories also wrote "about life among harsh realities" on both land and at sea. The works of these writer diverges greatly from earlier writers who use more romantic depictions of upper-class men at sea, like Fenimore Cooper, Melville (even Redburn) and Joseph Conrad, depicting what critic Alan Ross called men generally "found covered in grease below decks". Garrett wrote, that "[Conrad] could write romantically and vividly of a ship in heavy sea, but when it came to men aboard he wrote as a conservatively-minded officer", and criticizes Conrad's depiction of the sailor Donkin as a villain in his novella Nigger of the Narcissus.

Japanese authors have also explored working-men's life at sea. Takiji Kobayashi's Kanikōsen (1929) (The Crab Cannery Ship, 2013)) describes the exploitation of Japanese crab fishermen by ship owners from a left-wing point-of-view. The book has been adapted into film and manga multiple times. Right-wing novelist Yukio Mishima, in his novel Gogo no Eikō (1963) (The Sailor Who Fell from Grace with the Sea,1965), chronicles the story of Ryuji, a sailor with vague notions of a special honor awaiting him at sea.

==== Life ashore ====
Another aspect of sailors' lives is their experiences of sailortown, that area of public houses, brothels, lodgings, etc., close to the docks which caters to their needs away from home. Herman Melville describes in Redburn Liverpool's sailortown. There are also works that deal with their experiences in their home port after leaving sailing behind, often reminiscing and longing for life at sea again. The old salt as a nautical storyteller is a common character.

Carsten Jensen's Vi, de druknede (We, the drowned, 2006) not only deals with men at sea but also encompasses the lives of boys growing up with dreams of becoming sailors and the experiences of the wives – and widows – of the seamen. James Hanley is another author who explores not only life afloat but the experiences of them and their families on land, especially in his series of five novels The Furys Chronicle.

=== Slave ships ===
While many maritime novels focus on adventure and heroic deeds, the prime function of ships, other than warfare, is the making of money. The darkest aspect of this, involving both greed and cruelty is seen in the slave trade: "The story of Britain's involvement in the slave trade echoes the profit versus morality debate that is present in so many maritime novels". Sacred Hunger (1992) is a historical novel by Barry Unsworth (1930–2012), which is set in the mid 18th century in the English sea port of Liverpool and aboard the Liverpool Merchant a slave ship. The novel's central theme is greed, with the subject of slavery being a primary medium for exploring the issue. The story line has a very extensive cast of characters, and the narrative interweaves elements of appalling cruelty and horror with extended comic interludes. It shared, in 1992, the Booker Prize that year with Michael Ondaatje's The English Patient. A sequel, The Quality of Mercy, Unsworth's last book, was published in 2011.

Greed and man's inhumanity to his fellows is also the subject of Fred D'Aguiar's third novel, Feeding the Ghosts (1997), which was inspired by the true story of the Zong massacre in which 132 slaves were thrown from a slave ship into the Atlantic for insurance purposes. According to historical accounts, one slave survived and climbed back onto the ship; and in D'Aguiar's narrative this slave – about whom there is next to no historical information – is developed as the fictional character Mintah.

=== Passenger ships ===
The importance of "the idea of the gentleman" can also be a theme of novels set on passenger ships, as for example with Anthony Trollope's novel John Caldigate. Several chapters of this novel deal with the eponymous hero's voyage to Australia. While Trollope claims "that life at sea is unlike life in general" the novel, in fact, presents "an intensified version of ordinary life, with social divisions rigorously enforced" which is underlined by "the physical separation of first- and second-class passengers".

While William Golding's novel Rites of Passage (1980) is set on board a warship the ship is also carrying a number of passengers on their way to Australia, who encompass a motley yet representative collection of early 19th century English society. Class division, or the assumption of a higher status than is warranted, is a running theme of the book. This theme focuses upon that major theme of maritime fiction, the proper conduct of a gentleman; however, it also deals with his often-stormy friendship between the protagonist Talbot and one of the officers, Lieutenant Summers, who sometimes feels slighted by Talbot's ill-thought-out comments and advice. Like many of Golding's books, it also looks at man's reversion to savagery in the wake of isolation. This novel forms the trilogy To the Ends of the Earth, with Close Quarters (1987) and Fire Down Below (1989).

Beryl Bainbridge deals with the sinking of the RMS Titanic in Every Man for Himself, which won the 1996 Whitbread Prize, and was a nominee of the Booker Prize. It also won the 1997 Commonwealth Writers' Prize (Europe and South Asia).

Sometimes, as with Katherine Anne Porter's Ship of Fools (1962), a ship can be a symbol: "if thought of as isolated in the midst of the ocean, a ship can stand for mankind and human society moving through time and struggling with its destiny." Set in 1931 Ship of Fools is an allegory that traces the rise of Nazism and looks metaphorically at the progress of the world on its "voyage to eternity" in the years leading to World War II. The novel tells the tale of a group of disparate characters sailing from Mexico to Europe aboard a German passenger ship. The large cast of characters includes Germans, a Swiss family, Mexicans, Americans, Spaniards, a group of Cuban medical students, and a Swede. In steerage there are 876 Spanish workers being returned from Cuba. Porter's title alludes to Ship of Fools (1494) by Sebastian Brant, which is an allegory, originating from Plato, The allegory depicts a vessel without a pilot, populated by human inhabitants who are deranged, frivolous, or oblivious, and seemingly ignorant of their course. The concept makes up the framework of the 15th century book which served as the inspiration for Hieronymous Bosch's famous painting, Ship of Fools: a ship—an entire fleet at first—sets off from Basel, bound for the Paradise of Fools.

== Nautical detail and language ==
A distinction between nautical fiction and other fiction merely using the sea as a setting or backdrop is an investment in nautical detail. Luis Iglesias describes James Fenimore Cooper's use in The Pilot of nautical language and "faithful [...] descriptions of nautical maneuvers and the vernacular expression of seafaring men" as reinforcing his work's authority for the reader, and as giving more credence to characters, which distinguishes it from earlier fiction set on or around the sea.

== Other notable works ==
=== Novels ===
Notable exponents of the sea novel not discussed above. (Note: This list includes some of the notable authors covered by Wikipedia. For a more expansive list of notable authors and works, see the Wikipedia Category: Category:Nautical historical novelists. Others not included in Wikipedia can be found at Historical Naval Fiction (though this list focuses only on "Age of Sail" fiction) or John Kohnen's Nautical Fiction list. More specific thematic lists, include Cruel Seas : World War 2 Merchant Marine-Related Nautical Fiction from the 1930s to Present,)

- Alain-René Le Sage (1668–1747): Vie et aventures de M. de Beauchesne (1733)
- Abbé Prévost (1697–1763): Voyages du Capitaine Robert Lade (1744)
- William Cardell (1780–1828): The Story of Jack Halyard and other works (1824)
- Pierre Loti (1850–1923) My Brother Yves (1883); An Iceland Fisherman (1886)
- Erskine Childers (1870–1922): The Riddle of the Sands (1903)
- Rafael Sabatini (1875–1950): The Sea Hawk (1915)
- H. M. Tomlinson (1873–1958): Gallions Reach (1927)
- Hans Kirk (1898–1962): The Fishermen (1928)
- Gore Vidal (1925–2012): Williwaw (1946)
- Herman Wouk (1915–2019): The Caine Mutiny (1952)
- Alistair MacLean (1922–1987): HMS Ulysses (1955)
- Hammond Innes (1913–1998): The Wreck of the Mary Deare (1956)
- Jorge Amado (1912–2001): Sea of Death (1936)

=== Novellas ===
Notable novellas include:

- Ernest Hemingway (1899–1961): The Old Man and the Sea

=== Short stories ===
- Stephen Crane (1871–1900): "Open Boat" (1898)
- Konstantin Mikhailovich Staniukovich (1843–1903): Maximka; Sea Stories (Translated from the Russian by Bernard Isaacs (Moscow, 1969?))
- Konstantin Mikhailovich Staniukovich, Running to the Shrouds: Nineteenth-Century Sea Stories, translated from the Russian by Neil Parsons. (London; Boston: Forest Books, 1986).
- Liam O'Flaherty, "The Conger Eel"

=== Magazines ===
In the twentieth century, sea stories were popular subjects for the pulp magazines. Adventure and Blue Book often ran sea stories by writers such as J. Allan Dunn and H. Bedford-Jones as part of their selection of fiction. Other works that included sea stories:

- Argosy, an American pulp magazine from 1882 through 1978.
- Boys Own Paper, a British story paper aimed at young and teenage boys, published from 1879 to 1967.
- The Hotspur, a British boys' paper published by D. C. Thomson & Co. From 1933 to 1959,

More specialized magazines include:

- The Ocean, one of the first specialized pulp magazines (March 1907 to January 1908)
- Sea Stories, a Street & Smith pulp (February 1922 to June 1930)
- Sea Novel Magazine, a Frank A. Munsey pulp (two issues: November 1940 and January 1941)
- Sea Story Annual and Sea Story Anthology (1940s Street & Smith large-size reprint pulps)
- Tales of the Sea, digest (Spring 1953)

== See also ==
- Adventure fiction
- Children's literature
- Glossary of nautical terms (disambiguation)
- List of fictional ships
- List of underwater science fiction works
- Pirates in popular culture
- Royal Navy in Popular Culture
- Sea in culture
- Submarine films
- War novel
- Women pirates in fiction
