= The Pilot: A Tale of the Sea =

1824 novel by James Fenimore Cooper

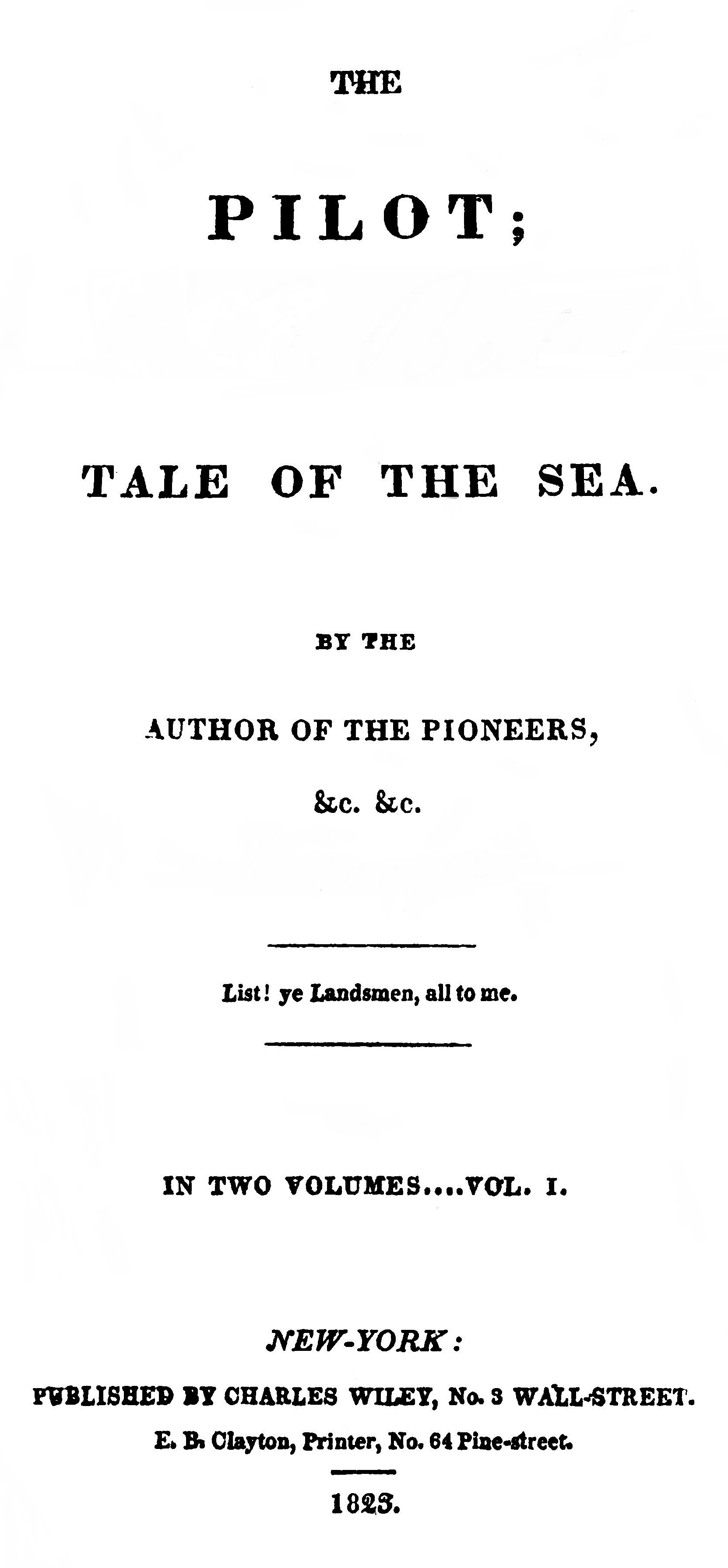
First edition title page

The Pilot: A Tale of the Sea is a historical novel by James Fenimore Cooper, first published in 1824. Its subject is the life of a naval pilot during the American Revolution. It is often considered the earliest example of nautical fiction in American literature. It is one of Cooper's most renowned works and is considered a classic of adventure literature. The novel follows the thrilling adventures of a mysterious and daring seafarer known as "The Pilot."

== Background ==
The Pilot was Cooper's fourth novel and his first sea tale. Cooper, being a sailor, brought his experiences in the U.S. Navy and his love for the sea into writing, "The Pilot: A Tale of the Sea." His naval service provided him with a deep understanding of maritime life, navigation, and the challenges faced by sailors during the early 19th century. This knowledge is shown in the detailed and authentic portrayal of realistic settings and events in the novel. James F. Cooper wanted to enlighten the readers to the feel and think of a more vivid picture of marine life and life at sea. Against his friends and family's doubtful views he proceeded on with the book. Later on, Cooper conducted an experiment with one of his family members and messmate. Cooper read a large portion of the first chapter to them with an unexpected response. The messmate gave a strong satisfaction to the book, praising the details and work put into it. Cooper had undertaken to surpass Walter Scott's Pirate (1821) in seamanship.

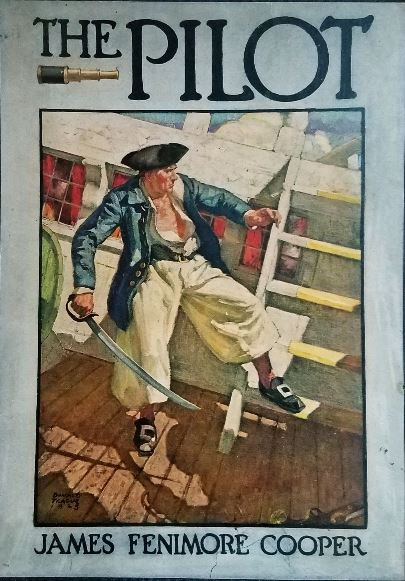
Cover from the 1925 edition, painted by Donald Teague

== Plot ==
Set in the waters off the coast of England, the novel introduces the mysterious character of the Pilot, John Paul Jones, who is a 33-year-old master of marine navigation and a pivotal figure in the war between the Continental Navy and the Royal Navy. His true identity and allegiances are shrouded in mystery, adding an element of intrigue to the narrative.

The story unfolds as the Continental Navy seek out British targets along the dangerous sea lanes of the North Atlantic while avoiding engagement with the more powerful Royal Navy. Among the battles, traitors, and skillful sea chases, the Pilot's loyalty and intentions become central questions, creating the tension and suspense of the novel.

Key supporting characters include Katherine Plowden, a Loyalist who becomes entangled in the conflict, and her suitor, the American sailor Barnstable. These characters bring depth and romantic elements to the story, making personal relationships into the overall context of the Revolutionary War.

== Characters ==
- John Paul Jones — regarded as America's first naval hero, is a central figure in the novel. Known for his brilliance and daring exploits during the American Revolutionary War, Jones plays a big role in the naval missions depicted in the story. His character embodies the spirit of patriotism and naval prowess and greatly influencing the events and outcomes of the plot.
- Captain Munson – Captain Munson commands the frigate Ariel, a significant ship in the American Navy. His leadership skills and strategic decisions contribute to the success of the American forces at sea. Munson's character reflects the challenges and responsibilities of naval command during a tumultuous period in history.
- Edward Griffith – Lieutenant Edward Griffith emerges as a complex character in "The Pilot." His romantic relationship with Cecilia Howard adds a layer of personal conflict to his role as a naval officer. Griffith's character development explores themes of love, duty, and the impact of war on personal relationships.
- Richard Barnstable – Lieutenant Richard Barnstable, romantically involved with Katherine Plowden, brings a new perspective to the novel. His character reflects the emotional toll of war and the challenges faced by individuals torn between love and duty.
- Long Tom Coffin – Long Tom Coffin, the towering coxswain, becomes a memorable character with his role in directing naval missions. His presence and knowledge at sea contribute to the realness of the maritime setting in the story.
- Katherine Plowden – Katherine Plowden, Richard Barnstable's lover, is a central figure in the subplot. Her character embodies the challenges faced by civilians caught in the crossfire of war, providing a new perspective beyond the military aspects of the narrative.
- Ceclia Howard – Cecilia Howard, cousin of Katherine, plays a crucial role in the romantic dynamics of the novel. Her character is intertwined with the social and familial aspects of the plot, adding depth to the narrative.
- Captain Manual – Captain Manual, an American Marine, contributes to the military operations depicted in the story. His character showcases the collaboration between different branches of the armed forces during the Revolutionary War.
- Colonel Howard – Colonel Howard, father of Cecilia, is a significant figure as the owner of St. Ruth Abbey. His character represents the civilian perspective, highlighting the impact of war on families and communities.
- Christopher Dillon – Christopher Dillon, the morose and self-centered attorney, adds an element of intrigue to the narrative. His character's motivations and actions contribute to the unfolding drama, creating tension and suspense.
- Captain Borroughchiffe — Captain Borroughchiffe, a Recruiting Officer and British soldier, serves as the guardian of the Abbey. His character represents the opposing forces in the war, creating conflict and driving the plot forward.
- Alice Dunscombe – Alice Dunscombe, an old companion to Katherine and Cecilia, provides insight into the characters' pasts. Her presence contributes to the depth of the relationships portrayed in the novel.
- Peters – Peters, a guardian in the Navy, meets a tragic fate at the hands of Edward Griffith. His character's storyline adds an element of drama and consequence to the events unfolding at sea.
- Colonel Fitzgerald – Colonel Fitzgerald's character plays a role in the broader context of the story, contributing to the historical and military aspects of the plot.
- Caeser and pompey – Caeser and Pompey, black slaves from St. Ruth Abbey, bring diversity to the character cast. Their roles highlight the social dynamics and complexities of the time.
- Merry – Merry, a midshipman and cousin of Katherine and Cecilia, assumes a leadership role in charge of Ariel. His character development explores the challenges faced by the younger generation thrust into positions of responsibility during wartime.

== Adaptations ==
The Pilot: A Tale of the Sea has inspired various adaptations, including stage productions and radio dramatizations. Its vivid sea battles and dramatic characters have made it an attractive source for visual media adaptations, and it remains an enduring piece of maritime literature. A notable adaptation is the play, "The Pilot: A Tale of the Sea," by Edward Fitzball. This play was first performed in 1833 in, Cape Town South Africa and was performed from 1833 till its last showing in 1862.
