= William Clark Russell =

English writer (1844–1911)

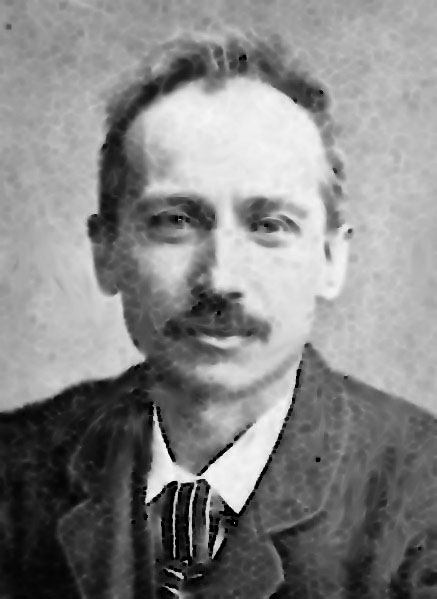
William Clark Russell from Who-When-What Book, 1900.

William Clark Russell (24 February 1844 – 8 November 1911) was an English writer best known for his nautical novels.

At the age of 13 Russell joined the United Kingdom's Merchant Navy, serving for eight years. The hardships of life at sea damaged his health permanently, but provided him with material for a career as a writer. He wrote short stories, press articles, historical essays, biographies and a book of verse, but was known best for his novels, most of which were about life at sea. He maintained a simultaneous career as a journalist, principally as a columnist on nautical subjects for The Daily Telegraph.

Russell campaigned for better conditions for merchant seamen, and his work influenced reforms approved by Parliament to prevent unscrupulous ship-owners from exploiting their crews. His influence in this respect was acknowledged by the future King George V. Among Russell's contemporary admirers were Herman Melville, Algernon Swinburne and Sir Arthur Conan Doyle.

== Life ==
=== Early years ===
William Clark Russell was born in New York City in the Carlton House Hotel, Broadway, one of four sons of the English composer Henry Russell and his first wife, Isabella Lloyd (1811?–1887).

It was from Isabella, "who was a relative of the poet William Wordsworth" and writer herself, that Russell inherited his love for literature and talent as a wordsmith. Additionally, he was the half-brother of the impresario Henry Russell and the conductor Sir Landon Ronald.

A letter in the collection of Robert Lee Wolff provides a scalding condemnation of Russell's father, stemming from his father's abandonment of his family.

If you know who my father is, I shall feel obliged by your not saying so. Enough if I hint at the degradation of a second marriage, at the imposition of a ready-made family of active and talkative youth to explain why I wish that you will be absolutely silent on the subject of my paternal parentage

William Russell was never able to forgive his father for his second marriage and his abandonment of his initial family to raise a new one with his second wife. Russell continued this long-held resentment against his father and his new family until his father's death in 1900. Not only did he avoid attending the funeral, but he also never acknowledged his half brothers.

He was educated at private schools in Britain (Winchester) and France (Boulogne). At the latter, together with a school friend, a son of Charles Dickens, he planned to quit school to travel in Africa. A letter from Dickens dissuaded the boys, but Russell continued to crave a life of adventure.

At the age of 13, Russell left school and joined the United Kingdom's Merchant Navy as an apprentice on the Duncan Dunbar. In 1894 he recollected:

Russell as a midshipman.

My first ship was a well-known Australian liner, the Duncan Dunbar. ... I went to sea as a midshipman, as it is termed, though I never could persuade myself that a lad in the Merchant Service, no matter how heavy might be the premium his friends paid for him, has a right to a title of grade or rating that belongs essentially and peculiarly to the Royal Navy. I signed for a shilling a month, and with the rest of us (there were ten) was called young gentleman; but we were put to work which an able seaman would have been within his rights in refusing, as being what is called boys' duty. I need not be particular. Enough that the discipline was as rough as though we had been lads in the forecastle, with a huge boatswain and brutal boatswain's mates to look after us. We paid ten guineas each as a contribution to some imagination of a stock of eatables for the midshipmen's berth; but my memory carries no more than a few tins of preserved potatoes, a great number of bottles of pickles, and a cask of exceedingly moist sugar. Therefore, we were thrown upon the ship's provisions, and I very soon became intimately acquainted with the quality and nature of the stores served out to forecastle hands.

Russell travelled to Asia and Australia. Off the coast of China during 1860 he witnessed the capture of the Taku Forts by combined British and French forces. Later, while he was serving on the ship Hougoumont, the third mate went mad, and attacked him with a table-knife. Russell began to write of some of his experiences when he was confined to his quarters for a breach of discipline.

At the age of 21, in 1866, Russell quit the Merchant Service. (Note: According to The New York Times he deserted, but other sources including the Oxford Dictionary of National Biography say that he retired.) As the privations of his eight years as a sailor had gravely damaged his health, he was never completely healthy again for the rest of his life. The positive legacy from his service was a wealth of material on which he based a successful career as a novelist.

=== Family ===
At the age of 24, Russell married Anna Maria Alexandrina Clark Russell née Henry (January 1845 – September 11, 1926), whom he referred to as Alexandrina. The two married on June 27, 1868 in St. Stephen, Paddington, Westminster, England.

In just one year, William and Alexandrina welcomed their first son, Herbert Henry William (March 28, 1869 – March 23, 1944), on March 28, 1869. In total the couple had six children, two sons and four daughters.

William Russell's first-born, Herbert, followed closely in his father's footsteps. Having caught his father's love for the sea and literature, Herbert followed a similar path to William's, also becoming a journalist for the very same newspapers, The Newcastle Daily Chronicle and The Daily Telegraph. Subsequently, Herbert wrote his own nautical novels and accompanied the Prince of Wales on his tour of India and Japan (1921–1922).

The Magazine, The War Illustrated, mentions both William Clarke Russell and Herbert Henry William Russell in their publication on June 7, 1917.

Lastly, but not least, for he is the biggest man of all the correspondents at G.H.Q., France, comes Mr. Herbert Russell, the representative of Reuter's and the Press Association. Big, bluff, and hearty, he is known among his colleagues as "The Genial Russell." He has the sailor rather than the soldier manner, which is fitting, perhaps, for he is the son of Clark Russell, the sailor and famous writer of sailor stories. It is to the sea and sailors and especially to the Navy that Russell has devoted his enthusiasm as a journalist. But his dispatches of late, with their quick, common-sense surveys of what is happening at the war, have shown that he is as "handy" a correspondent on land as on sea ? and they say that Russell can give you from memory the size, armament, and equipment of any ship in the British Navy with details of its personnel, which, as the Yankees would say it 'going some'.

== Career ==
=== Journalism ===
Russell had an office job with a commercial company for a few months, after which he decided to attempt a literary career. His first attempt was a five-act tragedy, Fra Angelico, which was staged unsuccessfully in London during 1866. At the same time, he began work as a journalist in order to provide a stable income for himself and his family. In 1868, he began his journalism career and was the editor for The Leader for a brief period of time until 1871 when he joined the Kent County News. and during the next two decades wrote for a variety of newspapers including The Newcastle Daily Chronicle, The Kent County News, and most importantly for him, The Daily Telegraph, for which he wrote articles for about seven years using the pseudonym "Seafarer".

At his time with the Daily Telegraph he planted the seeds of what would be his legacy, his masterful prose of the sea. Among his works with the Daily Telegraph are the Indian Chief (5 January 1881), and many of his articles were reprinted in volumes to create My Watch Below (1882) and Round the Galley Fire (1883).

=== Writer ===
There is much confusion around Russell's career, possibly a result of his writings being published anonymously or under various pseudonyms, so much so that even his immediate family were unaware of the full extent of his writings. From the early 1870s, Russell published novels using various pseudonyms (Sydney Mostyn, Eliza Rhyl Davies, and Philip Sheldon) with modest success. The adoption of the more feminine pseudonyms, according to Andrew Nash, "arose from his perception of the novel as a feminized form and novel-reading as predominantly a female activity." Adopting many feminine pseudonyms in his early works was a result of the Victorian era belief that certain genres were destined only for certain genders. His early attempts at novels set on land only proved to be a failure, obscured by the nautical novels that had established him as a master of the niche during his time. In conjunction, his poetic and artistic prose and description of the sea facilitated his literary success.

The stories of an old seaman at Ramsgate gave him the idea of writing about life at sea, drawing on his own experience. An obituarist of Russell wrote that since the heyday of such writers as Captain Marryat, Michael Scott and Frederick Chamier some thirty or forty years before, "no one in this country had written of the sea from actual knowledge". As Richard D. Graham notes in Masters of Victorian Literature, 1837–1897, "Of living authors, William Clark Russell (1844) is the true successor of Marryat, and may even be said to excel the older writer in the power with which he has described the cruel mystery of the sea, its dangers, and the crimes and superstitions of the men who do business upon it".

Russell during 1894.

Russell was at first doubtful if stories of merchant navy life could compete with tales of the Royal Navy: "Only two writers had dealt with the mercantile side of the ocean life – Dana, the author of Two Years before the Mast and Herman Melville, both of them, it is needless to say, Americans. I could not recollect [such] a book written by an Englishman." His first attempt at a novel of merchant navy life was John Holdsworth, Chief Mate during 1875, which Russell later thought of as "reluctant and timid in dealing with sea topics". It received kindly reviews, but Russell regarded his next attempt, The Wreck of the Grosvenor (1877), as his first real sea book.

Russell sold the copyright of The Wreck of the Grosvenor to the publisher Sampson Low for £50 (about £21,000 in 2011 terms). During the next four years it sold nearly 35,000 copies. Excellent reviews and good sales helped establish Russell's writing pattern. The scholar John Sutherland wrote during 1989 that The Wreck of the Grosvenor was "the most popular mid-Victorian melodrama of adventure and heroism at sea." It remained popular and widely read in illustrated editions well into the first half of the 20th century. It was Russell's best-selling and best-known novel, though at the time of its first appearance in 1877, it published anonymously. Russell noted in a preface, the novel "found its first and best welcome in the United States," and commented elsewhere that his work was greeted with more enthusiasm in the United States than in Britain.

The biographer G S Woods lists among Russell's best sea novels The Frozen Pirate (1877), A Sailor's Sweetheart (1880), An Ocean Tragedy (1881), The Death Ship (1888), List, ye Landsmen (1894) and Overdue (1903). According to Woods, Russell wrote a total of 57 novels. Additionally, he published collections of short stories and newspaper articles; a volume of historical essays; popular biographies (William Dampier and Admirals Nelson and Collingwood); and a collection of verses.

Among authors, Russell is widely admired and revered. Algernon Swinburne described Russell as "the greatest master of the sea, living or dead." Herman Melville admired Russell's work, and dedicated his book John Marr and Other Sailors (1888) to him. Russell reciprocated, dedicating An Ocean Tragedy to Melville during 1890. Despite their mutual regard, neither writer influenced the other's style, and it is Melville's works that have proved the more enduring. Arthur Conan Doyle made Dr. John Watson an admirer in The Five Orange Pips in which he was "deep in one of Clark Russell's fine sea stories" while temporarily back in 221B Baker Street.

Particularly during later years, when arthritis made it difficult for him to hold a pen, Russell dictated his work to a secretary. According to The Manchester Guardian, "like most dictated work, these books have a rather inflated, rhetorical, literary manner." Despite this criticism, the paper concluded:

His books are well-proportioned. They are well thought out. His characters have all been 'seen'. Even his ships have character. No other sea writer, except perhaps Melville … has given such patient, inventive care to the setting in which his characters move. … He saw things so clearly that he could make them real in description. … In his best books and in his wonderful short stories he has set down the semblance of sea life and of the changing beauty of the waters as faithfully as such things can be done.

According to Woods, "His descriptions of storms at sea and atmospheric effects were brilliant pieces of word painting, but his characterization was often indifferent, and his plots were apt to become monotonous." Among the praise Russell received from his colleagues, he is also far revered by his contemporaries such as Sir Edwin Arnold who said, "he was the prose Homer of the great ocean".

=== Campaigner ===
Woods writes that Russell's sea novels "stimulated public interest in the conditions under which sailors lived, and thereby paved the way for the reform of many abuses." The year after Russell's death, Woods wrote:

A zealous champion in the press of the grievances of the merchant seamen, Clark Russell urged that the hardships of their life were practically unchanged since the repeal of the Navigation Acts in 1854, and that despite the Merchant Shipping Act of 1876 ships were still sent to sea undermanned and overladen. In response to this agitation further acts of parliament to prevent unseaworthy vessels putting to sea were passed in 1880, 1883, 1889, and 1892. In 1885 Clark Russell protested against the seamen and firemen not being represented on the shipping commission, which was appointed by Mr. Chamberlain. In 1896 the Duke of York (afterwards King George V) expressed his opinion that the great improvement in the conditions of the merchant service was due in no small degree to Clark Russell's writings.

Later, Russell turned his attention to the deplorable provisions that unscrupulous ship-owners provided for merchant seamen on their vessels: "Nothing more atrociously nasty could be found amongst the neglected putrid sweepings of a butcher's back premises".

But, his efforts did not stop there. Russell extended his sympathy even to the captive natives of the time of British colonization of Tasmania. He described in great detail the merciless treatment the British forces used against native captives. One such description so horrifically described was the story of Lalla Rookh of Tasmania, a Tasmanian girl who had watched her mother get butchered by the British settlers, her sisters raped and captured, and the men of her family shot dead in front of her. The horrors for Lalla only continued as she was taken on a convict ship sailing to Australia, all of which Russell was a witness. The Owl, a Birmingham newspaper, wrote the following:

The poor wretches were treated like beasts and flogged unmercifully, and their fearful experiences on an outward bound convict ship, so vividly painted by William Clark Russell, were but foretastes of the horrors awaiting them in the penal colonies of Australia.

Though this did little to halt the brutish treatment by the British colonizers, Russell's empathy towards those captive people helped to record and reveal the atrocity committed by the British people.

=== Later years ===
During his last two decades Russell became progressively more disabled by arthritis, generally regarded as a legacy of his years at sea as a youth – "the sailor's enemy", as The Manchester Guardian stated. He did not allow this to stop him writing; The Times commented, "He worked harder than many haler men." He went to health resorts including Bath, Droitwich and Madeira, and after living in Ramsgate and Deal on the south coast of England, he settled in Bath. He was bed-ridden for the last six months of his life.

Russell died at his home in Bath at the age of 67, and his remains are buried in Smallcombe Cemetery in Bath.

== Works ==
- Fra Angelo – A tragedy in five acts (1865)
- The Hunchback's Charge (1867)
- The Book of Authors – A Collection of Criticisms, Ana, Môts, Personal Descriptions, etc (1871)
- Memoirs of Mrs. Lætitia Boothby (1872)
- Perplexity (as "Sydney Mostyn", 1872)
- Representative Actors – A Collection of Criticisms, Anecdotes, Personal Descriptions, etc (1872)
- The Surgeon's Secret (as "Sydney Mostyn", 1872)
- Kitty's Rival (as "Sydney Mostyn", 1873)
- Which Sister? (as "Sydney Mostyn", 1873)
- As Innocent as a Baby (1874)
- The Book of Table-talk – Selections from the Conversations of Poets, Philosophers, Statesmen, Divines, &c (1874)
- The Deceased Wife's Sister, and My Beautiful Neighbour (published anonymously, 1874)
- The Mystery of Ashleigh Manor – A Romance (as "Eliza Rhyl Davies", 1874)
- Jilted – Or My Uncle's Scheme (published anonymously, 1875)
- A Dark Secret (as "Eliza Rhyl Davies", 1875)
- John Holdsworth, Chief Mate (1875)
- Captain Fanny (1876)
- The Wreck of the Grosvenor (1877)
- The Little Loo (as "Sydney Mostyn", 1878)
- Auld Lang Syne (1878)
- A Sailor's Sweetheart (1880)
- An Ocean Free-Lance (1881)
- My Watch Below – or Yarns Spun When Off Duty (as "Seafarer" 1881)
- Round the Galley Fire (1883)
- Jack's Courtship (1884)
- On the Fo'k'sle Head (1884)
- English Channel Ports (1884)
- A Sea Queen (1884)
- Our Pilots (as "Seafarer", 1885)
- A Strange Voyage (1885)
- In the Middle Watch (1885)
- A Voyage to the Cape (1886)
- A Book for the Hammock (1887)
- The Frozen Pirate (1887)
- The Golden Hope (1887)
- The Death Ship, or The Flying Dutchman (1888)
- The Mystery of the Ocean Star (1888)
- An Ocean Tragedy (1889)
- Betwixt the Forelands (1889; historical essays)
- The Romance of Jenny Harlowe (1889)
- William Dampier (1889)
- Nelson's Words and Deeds (with W H Jacques, 1890)
- A Voyage at Anchor (1890)
- My Shipmate Louise (1890)
- The Life of Admiral Lord Collingwood (1891)
- Horatio Nelson and the Naval Supremacy of England (1891)
- Marooned (1891)
- My Danish Sweetheart (1891)
- A Marriage at Sea (1891)
- Master Rockafellar's Voyage (1891)
- Mrs. Dines's Jewels – A Mid-Atlantic Romance (1892)
- A Strange Elopement (1892)
- List, Ye Landsmen! (1893)
- The Emigrant Ship (1893)
- The Tragedy of Ida Noble (1893)
- A Three-Stranded Yarn (1894)
- The Good Ship Mohock (1894)
- Heart of Oak (1895)
- The Convict Ship (1895)
- The Phantom Death (1895; collected horror stories)
- The Honour of the Flag, and Other Stories (1896; short stories)
- The Copsford Mystery (1896)
- The Tale of The Ten (1896)
- The Lady Maud (1896)
- What Cheer! (1896)
- A Noble Haul (1897)
- Pictures from the Life of Nelson (1897)
- The Two Captains (1897)
- The Last Entry (1897)
- A Tale of Two Tunnels (1897)
- Romance of A Midshipman (1898)
- A Voyage At Anchor (1899)
- An Atlantic Tragedy, and Other Stories (1899)
- The Ship – Her Story (1899)
- Rose Island – The Strange Story of Love Adventure at Sea (1899)
- His Island Princess (1900)
- The Cruise of The Pretty Polly (1900)
- The Ship's Adventure (1901)
- Overdue (1903)
- The Captain's Wife (1903)
- Abandoned (1904)
- Wrong Side Out (1904)
- The Life of Nelson in a Series of Episodes (1905)
- The Yarn of Old Harbour Town (1905)
- The Mystery of the "Ocean Star" and Other Maritime Sketches (1905)
- An Atlantic Tragedy, and Other Stories (1905)
- The Turnpike Sailor – Or Rhymes on the Road (1907)
- The Father of the Sea, and Other Legends of the Deep (1911; new edition of The Turnpike Sailor)

== Sources ==
- Ancestry.com. 1901 England Census [database on-line]. Provo, UT, US: Ancestry.com Operations Inc, 2005.
- Ancestry.com. London, England, Church of England Marriages and Banns, 1754-1932 [database on-line]. Provo, UT, US: Ancestry.com Operations, Inc., 2010.
- Ashbury, Gordon. "Sir Herbert Henry William Russell KBE (1869–1944) » Genealogy Ashbury, Marsden » Genealogie Online". Genealogie Online, 2019, www.genealogieonline.nl/en/genealogy-ashbury-marsden/I1928.php#bronnen. Accessed 20 Feb 2019.
- "Expanding the Empire: How Tasmania Was Colonised." The Owl, 31 Mar. 1899, p. 12.
- Gale, Robert L (1995). A Herman Melville Encyclopedia. Westport, Conn: Greenwood Press. ISBN 0313290113.
- Graham, Richard D. The Masters Of Victorian Literature, 1837–1897. 1st ed., Simpkin, Marshall & Co, 1897, p. 166.
- Madison, R D (2006). "Literature of Exploration and the Sea". In Wyn Kelley (ed.). A Companion to Herman Melville. Oxford: Blackwell. ISBN 1405122315.
- Nash, Andrew. William Clark Russell And The Victorian Nautical Novel: Gender, Genre, And The Marketplace. 1st ed., Routledge, 2016, p. 24.
- Nash, Andrew. "William Clark Russell and 'Chambers's Journal': Elopement and the Victorian Nautical Novel." Victorian Periodicals Review, vol. 43, no. 1, 2010, pp. 42–56. JSTOR, www.jstor.org/stable/25732086.
- Russell, William Clarke (1894). "The Wreck of the Grosvenor". In Jerome K. Jerome; et al. (eds.). My First Book. London: Chatto and Windus. OCLC 5238745.
- Sutherland, John (1989). The Stanford Companion to Victorian Literature. Stanford, CA: Stanford University Press. ISBN 0804715289.
- Nash, Andrew (2004). "Russell, William Clark (1844–1911), novelist". Oxford Dictionary of National Biography (online ed.). Oxford University Press. doi:10.1093/ref:odnb/35888. ISBN 9780198614128. (Subscription, Wikipedia Library access or UK public library membership required.)
