= White-Jacket =

1850 novel by Herman Melville

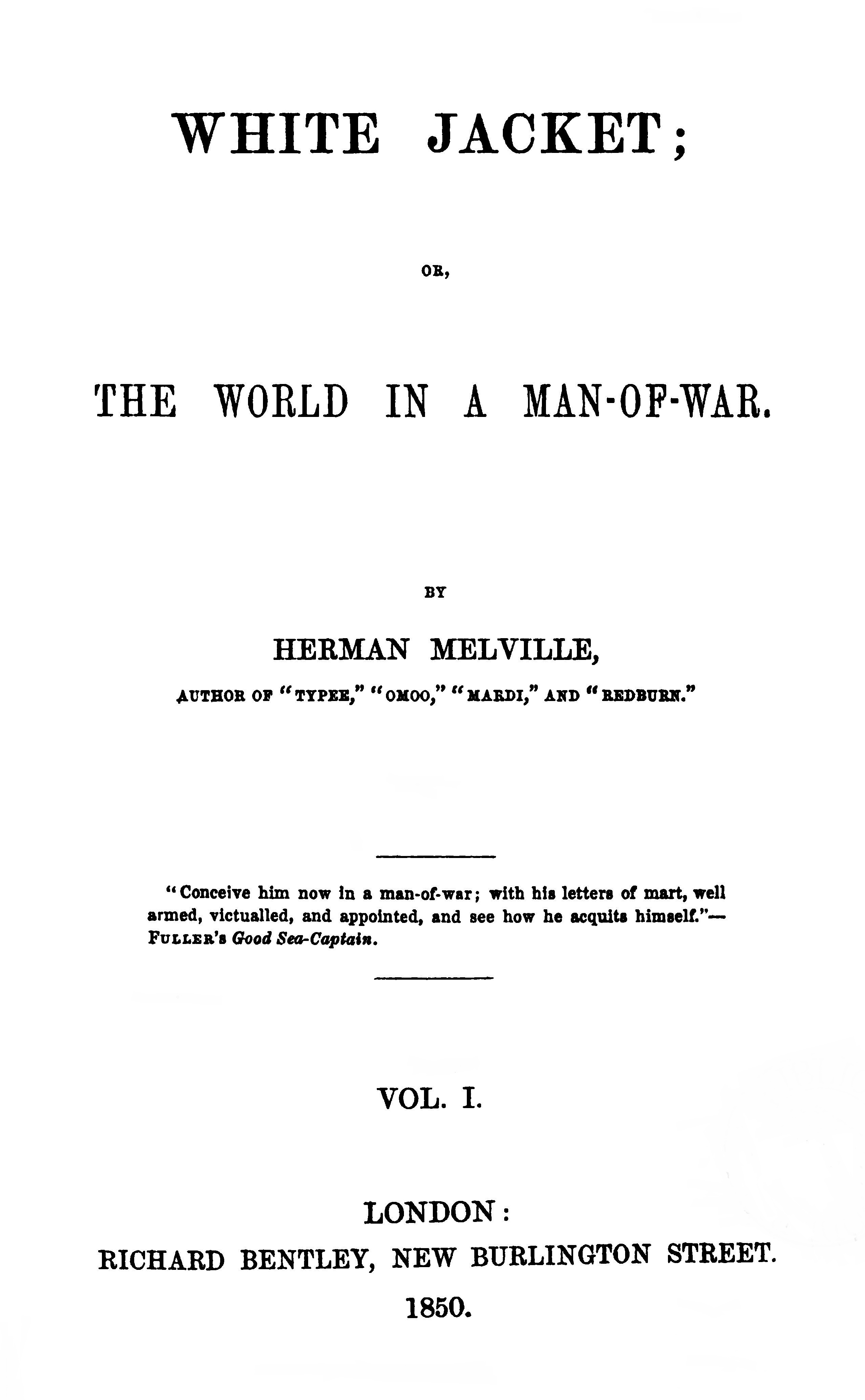
- First edition title page
- Author: Herman Melville
- Language: English
- Genre: Adventure fiction
- Published: 1850 (London: Richard Bentley); 1850 (New York: Harper & Brothers)
- Publication place: United States, England
- Media type: Print
- Preceded by: Redburn
- Followed by: Moby-Dick

White-Jacket; or, The World in a Man-of-War is the fifth book by American writer Herman Melville, first published in London in 1850. The book is based on the author's fourteen months' service in the United States Navy, aboard the frigate USS Neversink (actually USS United States).

Although early biographers of Melville assumed the account was reliably autobiographical, scholars have shown that much in the book was taken and transformed from popular sea books.

== Overview ==
Based on Melville's experiences as a common seaman aboard the frigate USS United States from 1843 to 1844, stories that other sailors told him, and earlier sea books, the novel is severely critical of virtually every aspect of American naval life and thus qualifies as Melville's most politically strident work. At the time, though, the one thing that journalists and politicians focused on in the novel was its graphic descriptions of flogging and the horrors caused by its arbitrary use; in fact, because Harper & Bros. made sure the book got into the hands of every member of Congress, White-Jacket was instrumental in abolishing flogging in the U.S. Navy forever. Melville scholars also acknowledge the huge number of parallels between White-Jacket and Billy Budd and view the former as "a major source for naval matters" in the latter.

The novel takes its title from the outer garment that the eponymous main character fashions for himself on board ship, with materials at hand, being in need of a coat sufficient for the rounding of Cape Horn. Due to a ship-wide rationing of tar, however, White-Jacket is forever denied his wish to tar the exterior of his coat and thus waterproof it. This causes him to have two near-death experiences, once when he is reclining among the canvases in the main-top and, his jacket blending in with the surrounding material, he is nearly unfurled along with the main sail; and once when, having been pitched overboard while reeving the halyards, he has to cut himself free from the coat in order not to drown. He having done so, his shipmates mistake the discarded jacket for a great white shark and harpoon it, sending it to a watery grave.

The symbolism of the color white, introduced in this novel in the form of the narrator's jacket, is more fully expanded upon in Moby-Dick, where it becomes an all-encompassing "blankness". The mixture of journalism, history, and fiction; the presentation of a sequence of striking characters; the metaphor of a sailing ship as the world in miniature, all prefigure Moby-Dick, his next novel.

== White-Jacket and the log of the USS United States ==
Many of the actual crew and the incidents of the voyage recorded in the ship log are transformed and figure prominently in White-Jacket. As one Melville scholar has stressed, "Melville rarely invents..." and "the ship's records bear him out." Foremost among them is Melville's hero Jack Chase, captain of the maintop, in reality Englishman John J. Chase, age 53, whom Melville introduces in White-Jacket, Chapter 4, Jack Chase, thus, "First and foremost was Jack Chase, our noble First Captain of the Top." Melville described Chase, as having fought at the Battle of Navarino and deserted USS St. Louis to fight for Peruvian independence. The ship log confirms Melville's narrative, Chase returned to the frigate on 29 May 1842 and was pardoned, at the request of the Peruvian ambassador for his services to the government of Peru.

Similarly among the officers, Melville's paragon is a lieutenant he calls, "Mad Jack". Melville describes Mad Jack as a model of excellence in chapter 8, in contrast to an ineffectual lieutenant whom Melville refers to as "Selvagee." "Mad Jack is in his saddle on the sea. That is his home ... Mad Jack was a bit of tyrant — they say all good officers are — but the sailors loved him all round; and would much rather stand fifty watches with him, than one with a rose-water sailor." Mad Jack's original was Lt. Latham B. Avery, who two of Melville's shipmates identified as Mad Jack. Melville writes (chapter 27), "In time of peril, like the needle to the loadstone, obedience, irrespective of rank, generally flies to him who is best fitted to command." Melville recorded one other telling detail about his hero: "But Mad Jack, alas! has one fearful. He drinks." Melville adds, "in very fine weather he was sometimes betrayed into a glass too many. But with Cape Horn before him, he took the Temperance Pledge outright, till that perilous promontory should be far astern." The log for 15 August and 6 September 1842 confirms that Lt. Lantham B. Avery was court-martialed and reprimanded for leaving the deck while he was drunk.

Another actual crew member is "the Purser, who was a southern gentleman...." The purser was Edward Fitzgerald, who like many naval officers of the era was a slaveholder. On 18 October 1841 Fitzgerald, requested the consent of the Secretary of the Navy, Abel P. Upshur, to entered his "servant" (slave), Robert Lucas, as a landsman (in reality his personal steward) as a crew member and whose nine dollar per month wages Fitzgerald collected. In reply, Secretary Upshur, on 26 October 1841, wrote, "the department grants your request to take your own servant aboard the frigate United States." In White-Jacket, Lucas becomes "Guinea" the purser's body servant, the only person aboard except the hospital steward and the invalids who is exempt from being present at muster for punishment. Once in Boston, Robert Lucas was able with the help of sympathetic shipmates to flee the vessel and successfully petition Lemuel Shaw, Chief Justice of the Massachusetts Superior Court, Melville's family friend and future father-in-law, for freedom. This important case Commonwealth vs. Edward Fitzgerald re Robert Lucas, became a precedent in the naval service, effectively barring enslaved individuals as seamen.

"In both the ship log and White-Jacket, mortality is prominent; with Melville relating and the log confirming the various modes of death." For sailors death and burial at sea or on a foreign shore was a commonplace." During the long voyage, six crew members died, including David Black, the ship's cooper, "Bungs", who fell overboard and perished on 4 October 1843. The actual log entry for 4 October 1843, is terse: "From 4 to 8 moderate breezes and clear weather at 5.22 David Black (Cooper) fell overboard, hove to with maintop sail to the mast and sent the Barge & 2nd Cutter in search of him … at 10.15 wore to the N hove to and hoisted up the 2nd Cutter, all search proving ineffectual." In White-Jacket, chapter 17, headed, "Away! Second, Third, and Fourth Cutters, Away!" Melville, transforms this brief passage into art,

"Do you see him?" shouted the officer of the watch through his trumpet, hailing the mainmast-head. "Man or buoy, do you see either?" "See nothing, sir," was the reply. "Clear away the cutters!" was the next order. "Bugler! call away the second, third, and fourth cutters' crews. Hands by the tackles!" In less than three minutes the three boats were down. More hands were wanted in one of them, and, among others, I jumped in to make up the deficiency.... For a time, in perfect silence, we slid up and down the great seething swells of the sea, but saw nothing. "There, it's no use," cried the officer; "he's gone, whoever he is. Pull away, men — pull away! they'll be recalling us soon." "Let him drown!" cried the strokesman; "he's spoiled my watch below for me." "Who the devil is he?" cried another. "He's one who'll never have a coffin!" replied a third. "No, no! they'll never sing out, 'All hands bury the dead!' for him, my hearties!" cried a fourth.

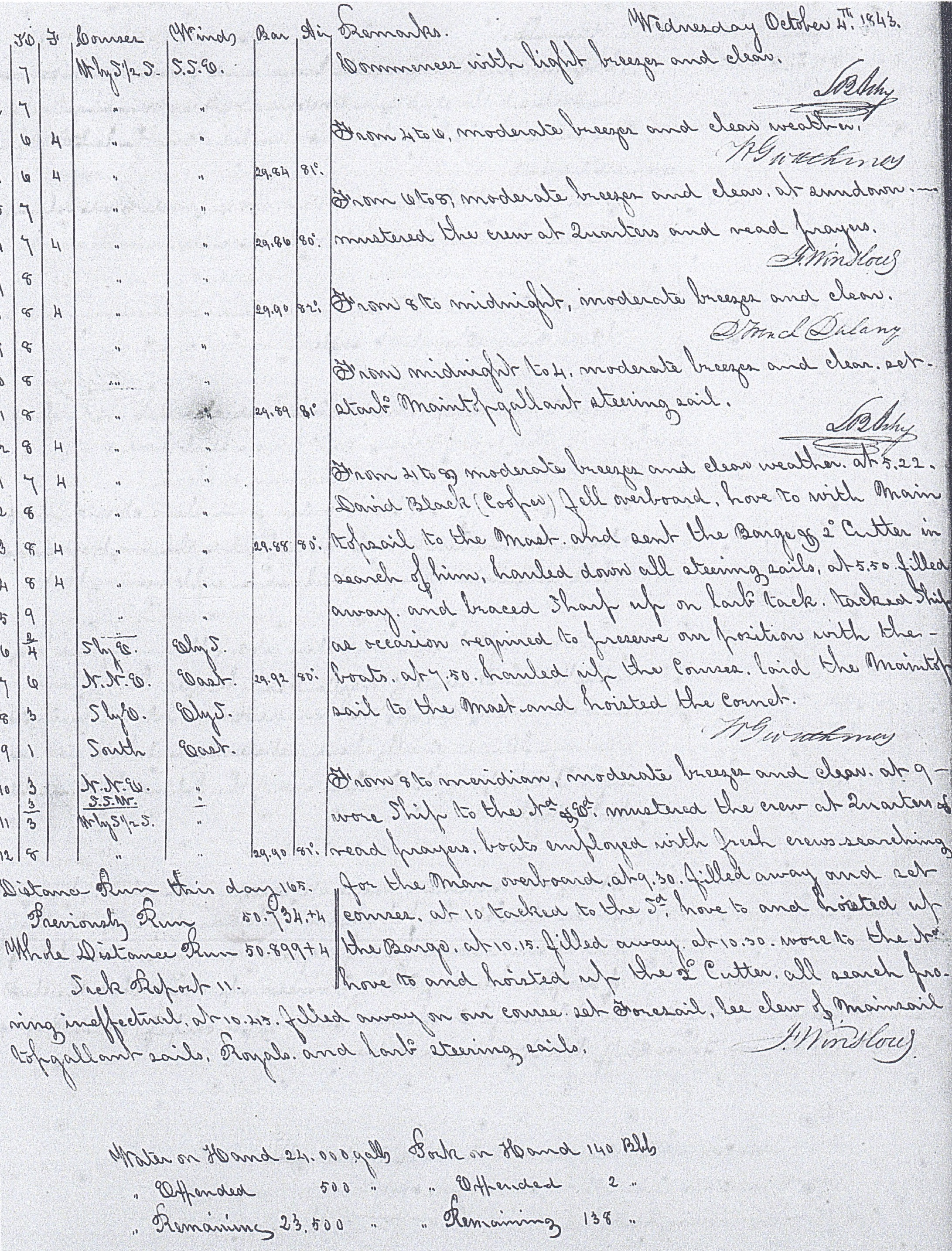
Log of USS United States, re David Black,(Cooper), dated 4 Oct 1843. Black was swept overboard. Herman Melville records and transforms the same incident, in White-Jacket, chapter 17.

The same incident is described by the anonymous author of Journal of A Cruise to the Pacific Ocean, 1842-1844, in the Frigate United States, who recounts a similar set of facts and circumstances.

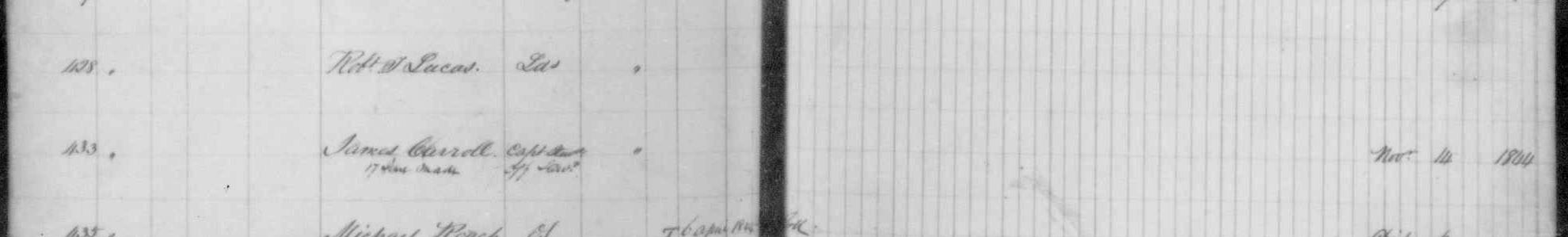
United States Navy, Muster of the crew of the frigate USS United States 1844 re Robert Lucas Landsman crew no. 428.

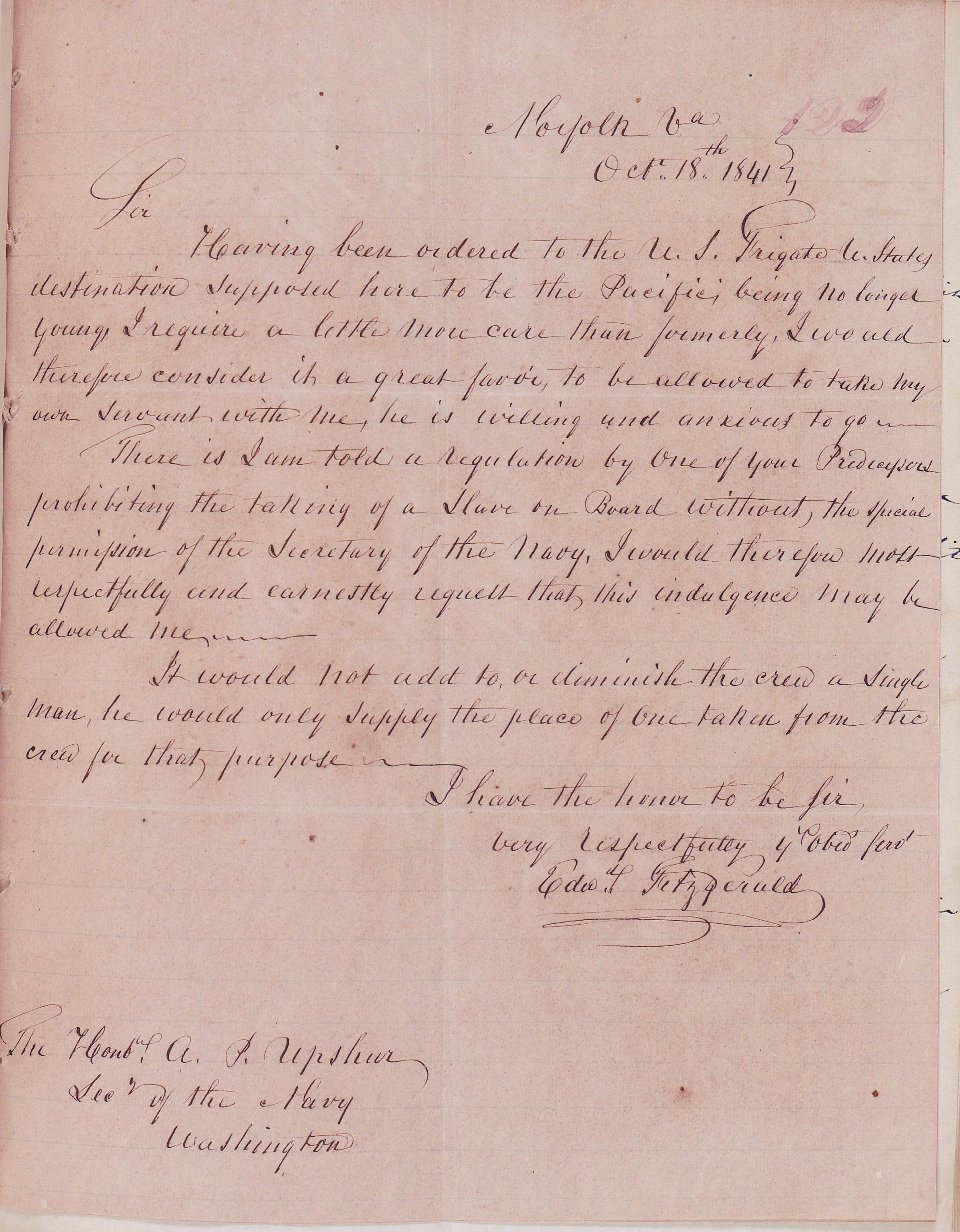
Purser Edward Fitzgerald USN to Secretary of the Navy, Abel P. Upshur, 18 Oct 1841 re permission to bring his enslaved "servant", Robert Lucas (Guinea), aboard USS United States

== Characters ==
This list is not exhaustive.

- White-Jacket, the main character and narrator, so nicknamed because his coat is the only white one on board; a novice sailor (at least on a naval ship), his jacket often gets him into trouble, mostly because of its whiteness
- Jack Chase, a sailor of British origin who is universally regarded by his fellow seamen and even by the officers as the epitome of a true and good sailor; he shows contempt for any man who has shipped out on a whaler
- Captain Claret, a captain of usually severe tendencies, his name reflects the fact that he is also an alcoholic
- Commodore
- Selvagee, a foppish lieutenant whose leadership style is tyrannical
- Mad Jack, a lieutenant whose leadership style is collegial
- Old Coffee, the ship's cook
- Mayday, a ship's cook deputy
- Rosewater, a ship's cook deputy
- Lemsford, a sailor who aspires to be a poet
- Quoin, a sailor "indefatigable in attending to his duties, which consisted in taking care of one division of the guns"
- Nord, a sailor of surly look and melancholy disposition; when White-Jacket first encounters him, the only friend Nord has on board is Lemsford
- Williams
- Wooloo, the commodore's Polynesian servant
- Old Revolver
- Old Combustibles
- Chaplain
- Cuticle, the ship's Surgeon
- Shakings
- Bland, the ship's master-at-arms
- Tawney, a sheet-anchor man, a "staid and sober seamen, very intelligent," whom White-Jacket sometimes invites to join the crew in the main top and tell stories. Tawney is the only black character in the novel to be treated equitably in relation to the other characters.
- Guinea, a slave owned by the ship's purser
- Ushant, a much admired sexagenarian and crew member of the fore top who, along with many other sailors, cultivates a long flowing beard or "homebounder." When Captain Claret commands all facial hair be shorn to meet Navy regulations, a small rebellion ensues but ultimately Ushant is the sole remaining dissenter. He is flogged, put in chains, and held in the brig for weeks, but arrives in Norfolk harbor with his beard intact and a hero among his peers. White-Jacket takes a hair from Ushant's beard as a memento.
- Don Pedro II, Emperor of Brazil

== Publication history ==
White-Jacket was published in London by Richard Bentley on February 1, 1850, and in New York by Harper & Brothers on March 21, 1850. Melville referred to it and his previous book Redburn as "two jobs which I have done for money—being forced to it as other men are to sawing wood."

== Legal impact ==
At the urging of New Hampshire Senator John P. Hale (whose daughter, Lucy, would later become the fiancée of John Wilkes Booth, the murderer of President Abraham Lincoln) the United States Congress banned flogging on all U.S. ships in September 1850. He was inspired by Melville's "vivid description of flogging, a brutal staple of 19th century naval discipline" in his "novelized memoir" White-Jacket.

The officer whom Melville based his fictional commodore on, Thomas ap Catesby Jones, a former commander of USS United States, was later brought up on a court-martial in 1850 and found guilty on three counts mostly related to "oppression" of junior officers. Jones was relieved of command for two and a half years. In 1853, President Millard Fillmore reinstated him, and in 1858 the United States Congress restored his pay.

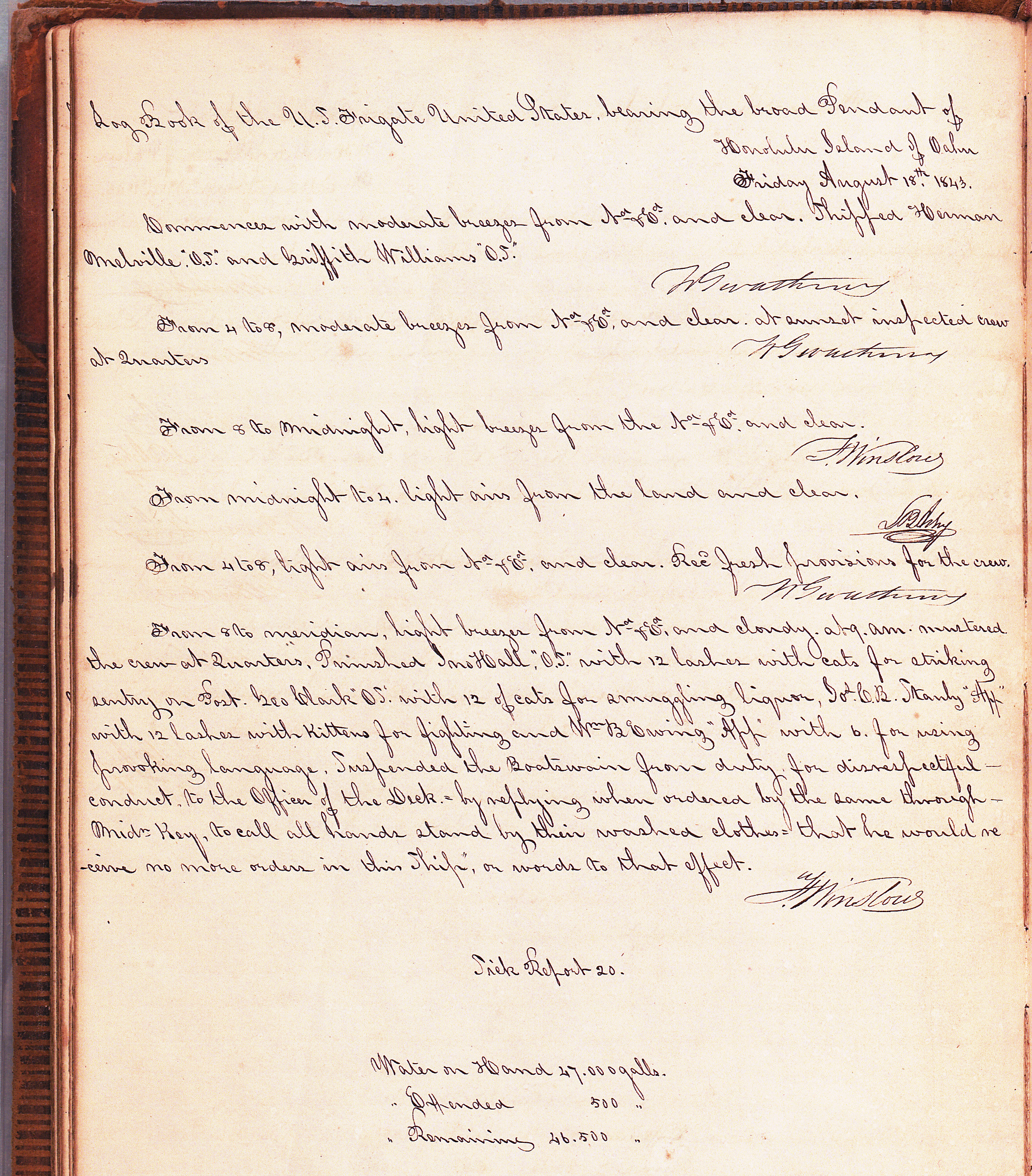
Log of USS United States August 18, 1843 record of entry of author Herman Melville O. S.(Ordinary Seaman) as crew

During Melville's time on the USS United States from 1843–1844, the ship log records 163 floggings, including some on his first and second days (18 and 19 August 1843) aboard the frigate at Honolulu, Oahu. The official log entry for 18 August 1843 simply states:

Commenced with moderate breezes from the N^{d} & E^{d}. and clear. Shipped Herman Melville. "O.S." and Griffith Williams "O.S." ... at 9 a m . mustered the crew at Quarters, Punished Jno Hall, "O.S" with 12 lashes with cats for striking sentry on Post. Geo Clark "OS" with 12 of cats for smuggling liquor, Bo^{s}. C. B. Stanly "App" with 12 lashes with Kittens for fighting and W^{m} B Ewing "App" with 6. for using provoking language. Suspended the Boatswain from duty for disrespectful - conduct to the Officer of the Deck,- by replying when ordered by same through – Midn [Midshipman] Key, to call all hands stand by their washed clothes "that he would 'receive no more orders in this Ship", or words to that effect.

The following day, 19 August 1843, the log records yet another muster for punishment. "From 8 to meridian, moderate breezes from the N^{d} & E^{d} and clear, at 9. hoisted in the 3^{d} Cutter, and got the lower booms alongside. Punished Geo Davis, W^{m} Stewart and Antonio Guavella "Bandsmen" with 12 lashes each for drunkenness." In "A Flogging" (chapter 33), Melville changed this brutal scene from 19 August 1843 in Honolulu Oahu to sometime later when the frigate was at sea. He also changed the names of the crewmen punished to John, Peter, Mark, and Antone and the charge from drunkenness to fighting. "Antone, the Portuguese" is clearly based on his recollection of Antonio Guavella."

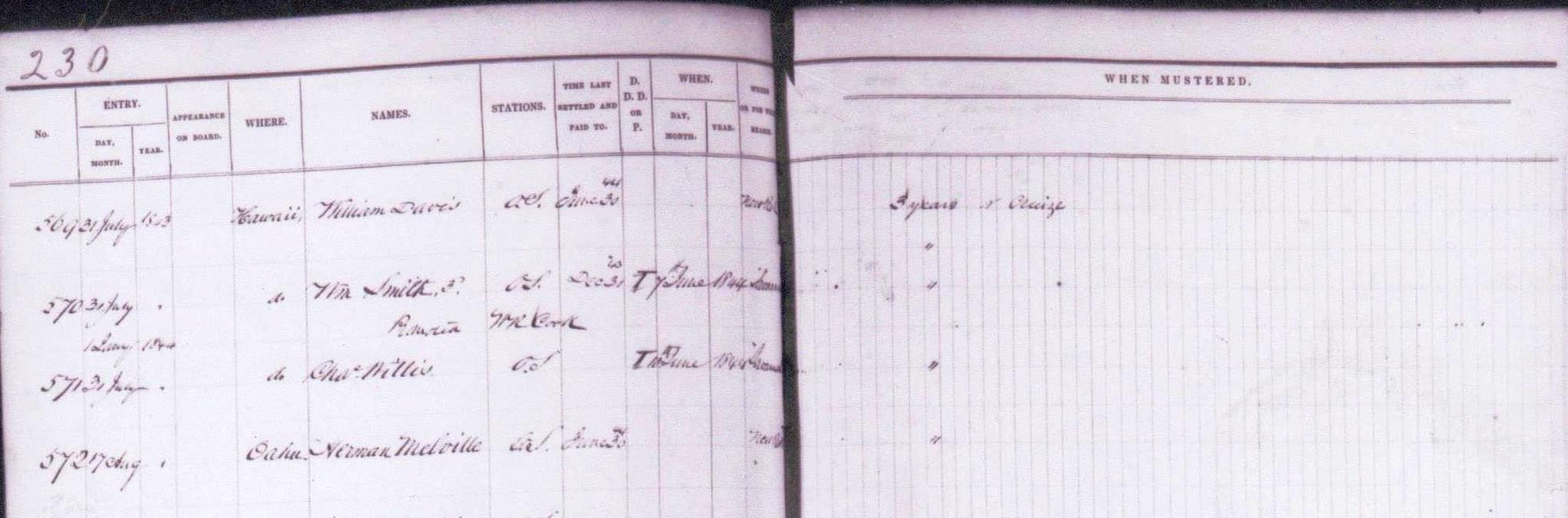
USS United States 1843–1844 muster roll Herman Melville Ordinary Seaman is recorded as number 572

== References and further reading ==
- Vincent, Howard (1970), The Tailoring of Melville's White-Jacket, Evanston: Northwestern University Press
