= Johann Adam Hartmann =

American trapper (1748–1836)

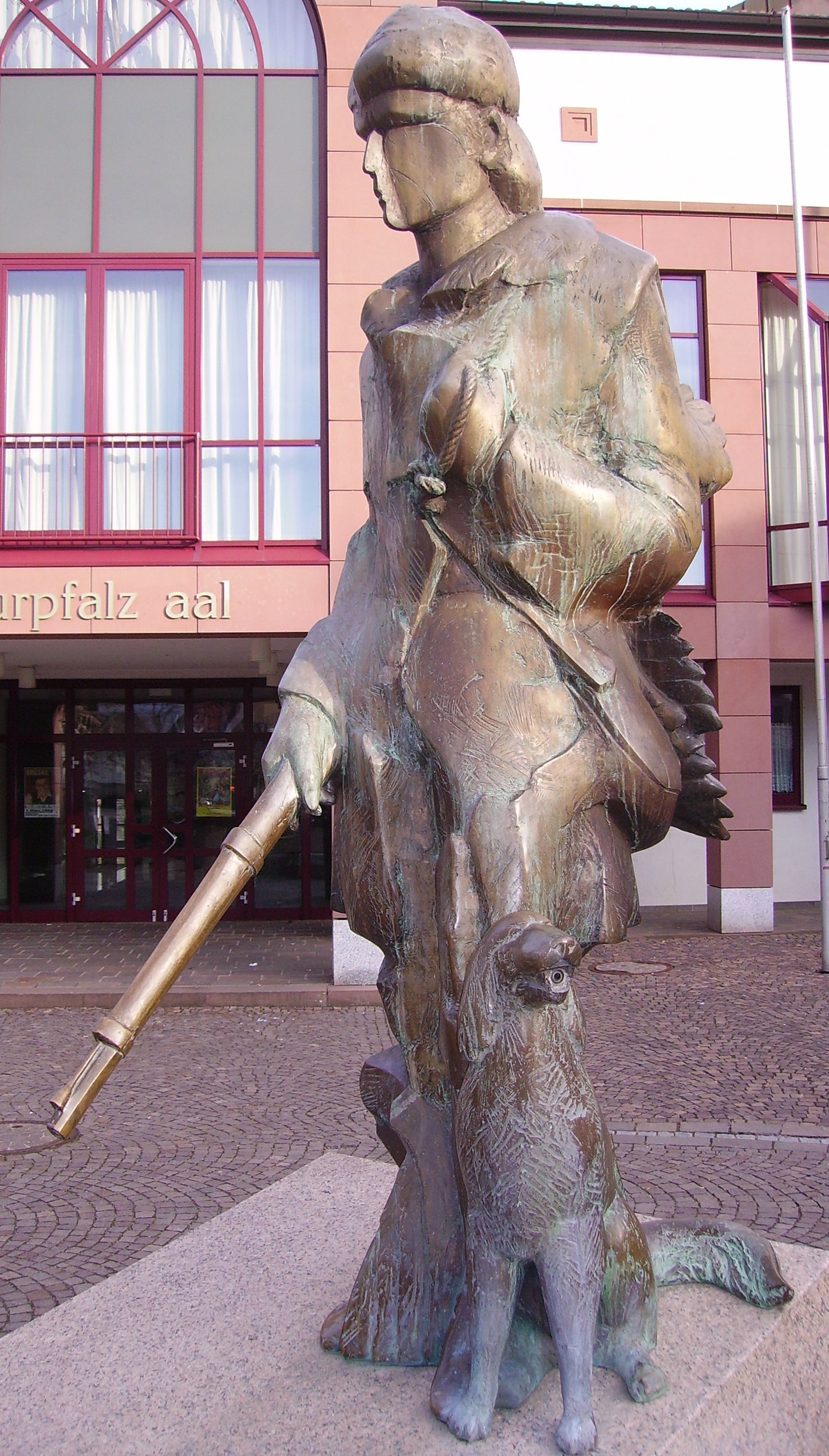
statue of Hartmann/Bumpo, part of the Lederstrumpfbrunnen in Edenkoben

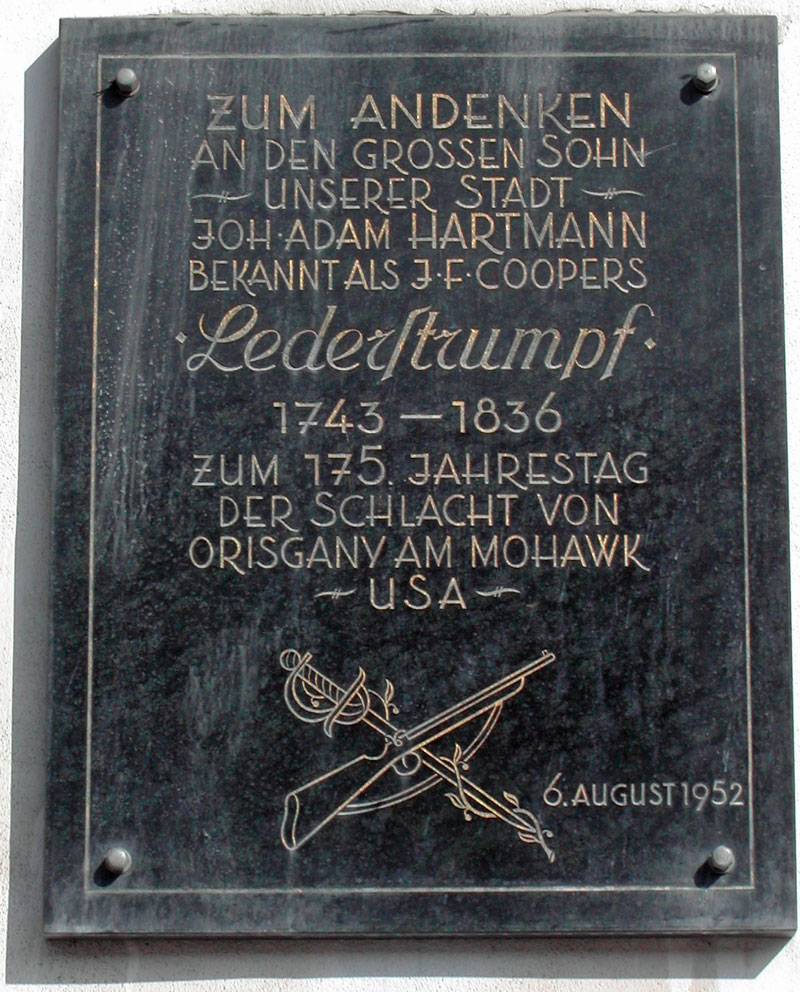
memorial plaque in Edenkoben with a wrong date of birth

Johann Adam Hartmann (1748–1836) was a German-born trapper and frontiersman in New York State. Some consider him as a possible inspiration for Natty Bumpo, the main character in James Fenimore Cooper's Leatherstocking Tales.

Hartmann was born in Edenkoben, Palatinate, Holy Roman Empire in 1748. His parents were Anna Maria Scholl, a native of Edenkoben and Johann Hartmann, a weaver who was originally from Switzerland. The couple married in 1737. Hartman left his hometown at the age of 16 to travel on the ship Boston from Rotterdam to Philadelphia. From there he moved to Upstate New York where he lived as frontiersman, trapper and hunter. When the American Revolutionary War broke out in 1775 Hartmann joined the American side and served as ranger at Fort Dayton. He participated in the Battle of Oriskany, where he got wounded by a shot. One description of his war time career goes as follows:

He was a scout at Fort Dayton. In a skirmish in which he killed an Indian he was himself wounded in almost the same instant by a Tory's shot. Hartmann was a famous frontiersman and had many adventures. He was the ideal of the fearless soldier in the tried and true militia of Tryon County.

— description quoted in Kuby,

After the war Hartmann stayed in Herkimer County and lived of a disability pension, that he received as a veteran of the revolution. He died on April 5, 1836.

The Leatherstocking Tales (German: Lederstrumpf) were hugely popular in Germany and in 1934 Carl Suesser published an article in Westermanns Monatshefte in which he suggested that Cooper might have been inspired by Hartmann when he created the character of Natty Bumpo. Alfred H. Kuby pointed out in 1983, that Cooper has mentioned Hartmann in the first edition of The Pioneers (1823) and that during his travels in Europe Cooper had spent some time in the region where Hartmann was born.

The city of Edenkoben dedicated a plaque to Hartmann on the occasion of the 175th anniversary of the Battle of Oriskany. Due to some computation error, that only got discovered after the plaque had been set up, it contains the wrong year of birth, 1743 instead of 1748. The German sculptor Gernot Rumpf designed a fountain for the city of Edenkoben, which was completed in 1990. The Lederstrumpfbrunnen (lit. Leatherstocking fountain) features three major statues of figures related to the Leatherstocking Tales, one of them is a statue of Hartmann/Bumpo displayed with a hunting rifle and a dog.
