= Steigerkopf =

Mountain in Germany

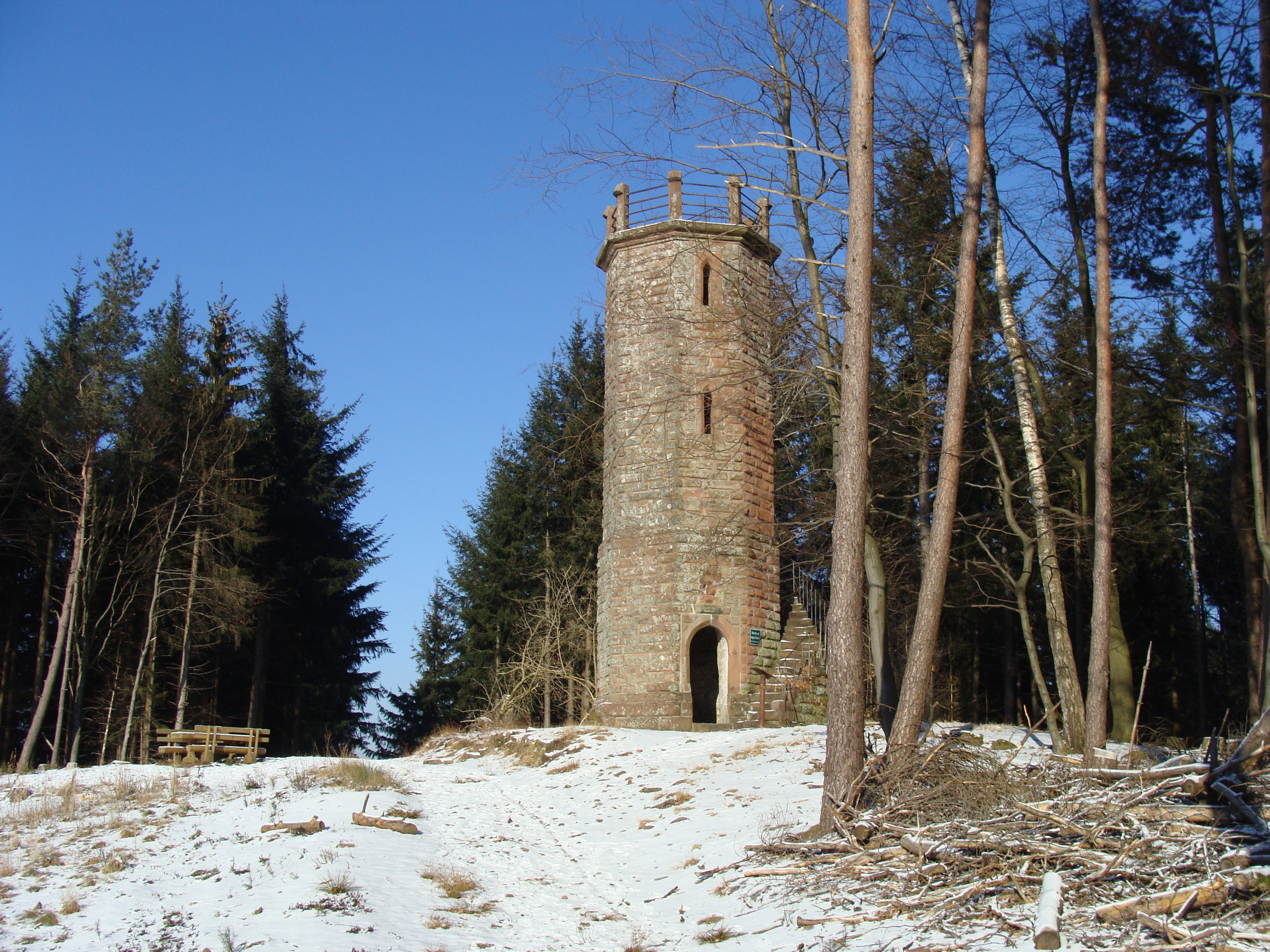
- The Steigerkopf and Schänzel tower in February 2012

Highest point
- Elevation: 613.6 m above sea level (NHN) (2,013 ft)
- Coordinates: 49°17′49″N 8°01′34″E

Geography
- Location within Rhineland-Palatinate
- Location: near Edenkoben; Südliche Weinstraße county, Rhineland-Palatinate Germany
- Parent range: Palatine Forest

Geology
- Rock type: bunter sandstone

The Steigerkopf, also colloquially called the Schänzel, near Edenkoben in the county of Südliche Weinstraße in the German state of Rhineland-Palatinate, is a mountain, 613.6 m above sea level (NHN), in the Palatine Forest. At the summit, which lies on the territory of Gommersheim, is the Schänzel tower.

== Location ==
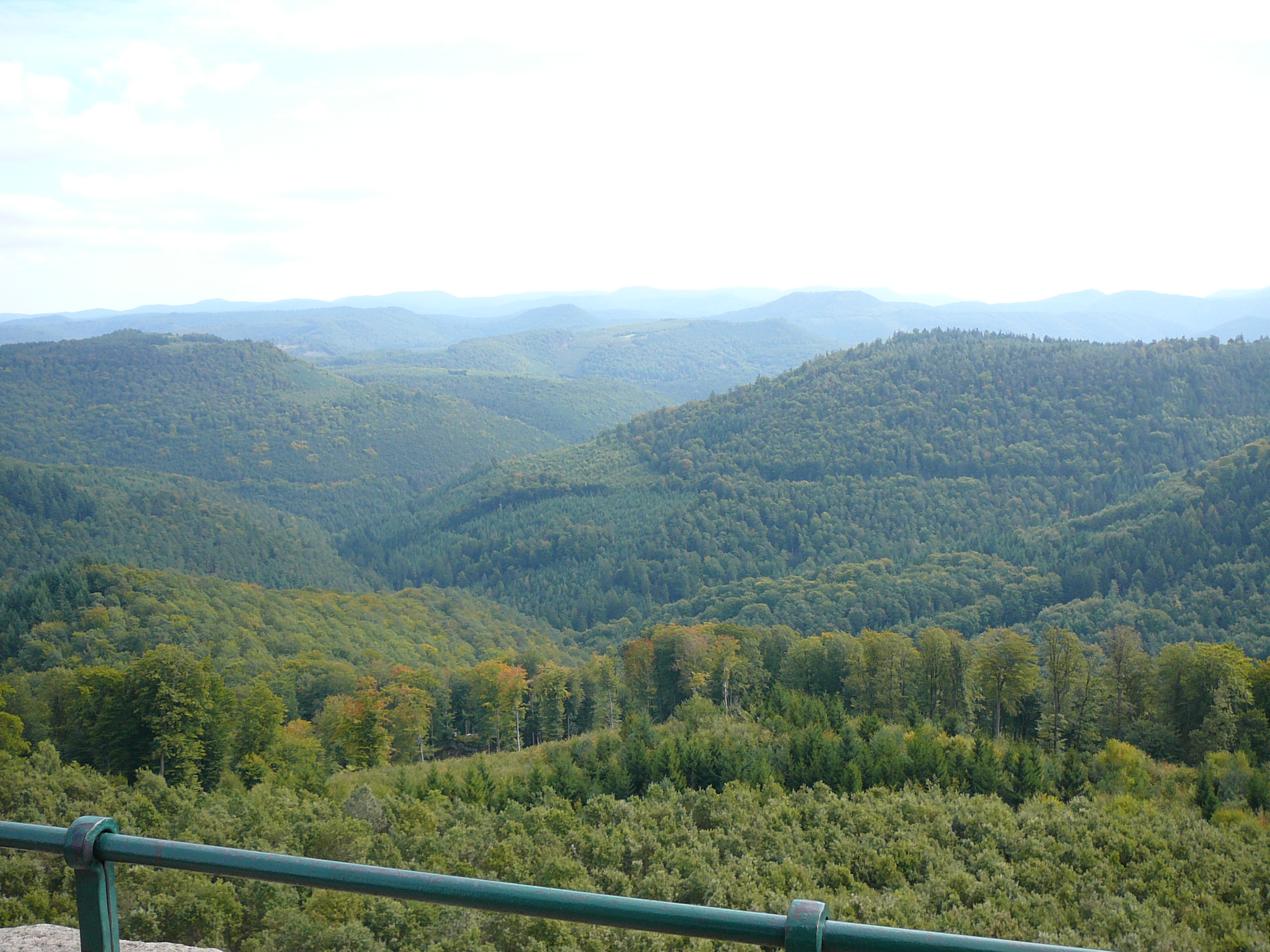
The Steigerkopf (centre) seen from the Weißenberg

The Steigerkopf lies in the eastern part of the Palatine Forest in the eponymous nature park. Its summit rises about 7 kilometres west-northwest of the small town of Edenkoben on the western rim of a group of mountains that are all over 600 m; 4 kilometres to the northeast is the highest peak in the Palatine Forest, the Kalmit (672.6 m). The summit and those parts of the mountain in the northeast belong to the forest parish of Gommersheim, which form an exclave of this municipality around 17 km to the west of Gommersheim itself. Geologically the Steigerkopf is a northwestern outlier of the 661.8 m high Kesselberg, whose top is 2 km (as the crow flies) away. The Modenbach, a right tributary of Speyerbach, rises on the southwestern flank of the mountain on which the Gommersheim Forest lies.

== History ==
=== Schänzel ===
Colloquially the Steigerkopf has also been referred to as the Schänzel ("little rampart") since about 4,500 Prussian soldiers built a sconce there in summer 1794. The earthworks were built to delay the 7,000 French Revolutionary troops who had been dispatched to conquer the German territories west of the Rhine. The French were victorious, however, following the decisive and bloody Battle of Trippstadt on 12 and 13 Jul 1794, after a local hunter from the nearby village of Dernbach had guided them into the rear of the Prussian position on the second day. The Prussian commander, General Theodor Philipp von Pfau (1727–1794), was taken prisoner after being severely wounded and died the same day.

=== Schänzel tower ===
In 1874, the Schänzel Tower (Schänzelturm) was built at the summit of the Steigerkopf in memory of the defeated Prussians in recognition of German victory in the 1871 Franco-Prussian War. It is an octagonal observation tower, 13 metres high and made of hewn bunter sandstone. The viewing platform on top of the tower is protected by railings.

The observation tower was dedicated in 1894, a hundred years after the 1794 battle, by the Schänzelturm Society of Edenkoben as follows:

Dem Andenken der tapferen preußischen Krieger, welche im Kampfe gegen das französische Invasionsheer am 13. Juli 1794 hier den Heldentod für das deutsche Vaterland starben

== Gallery ==
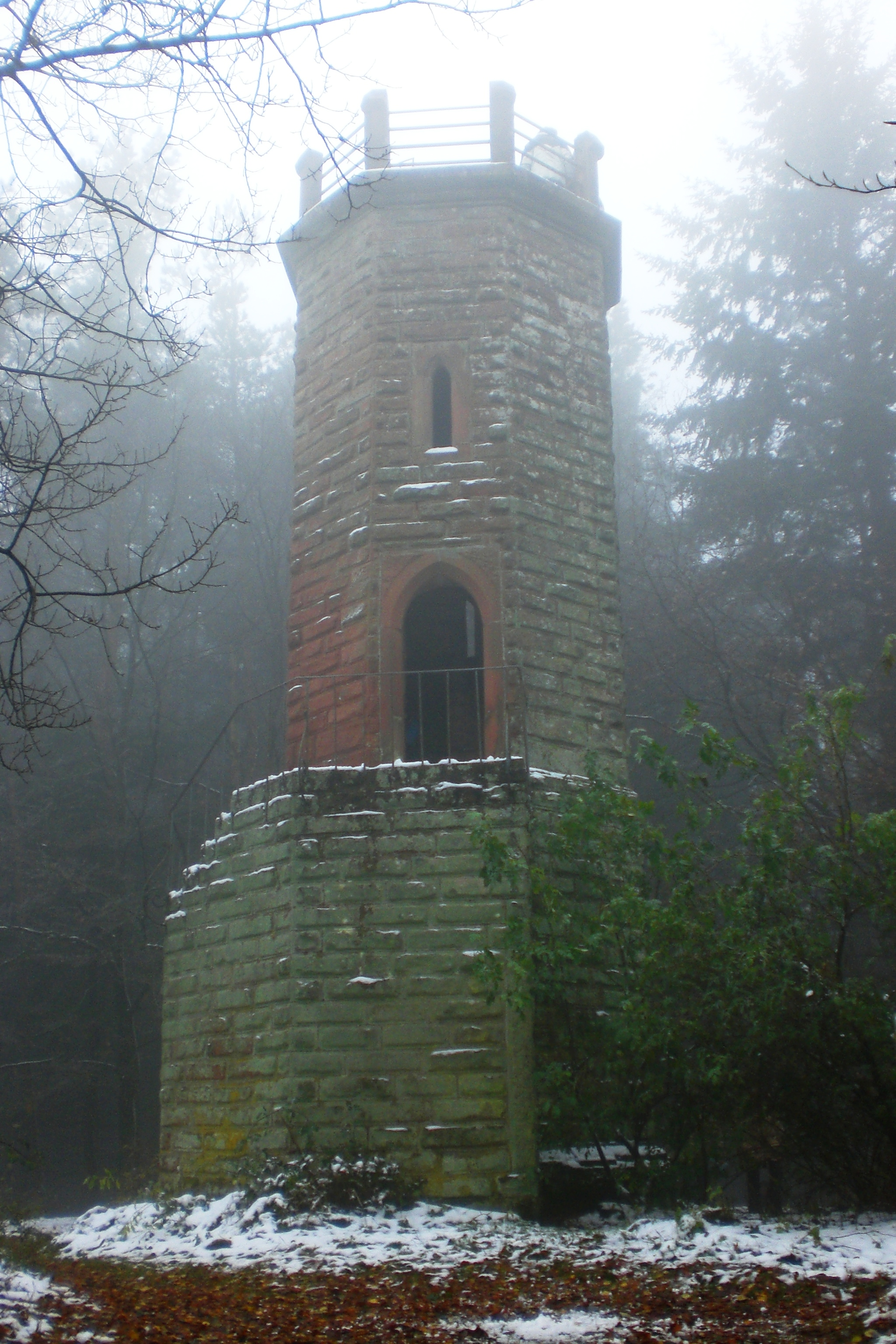
The Schänzelturm in November 2007

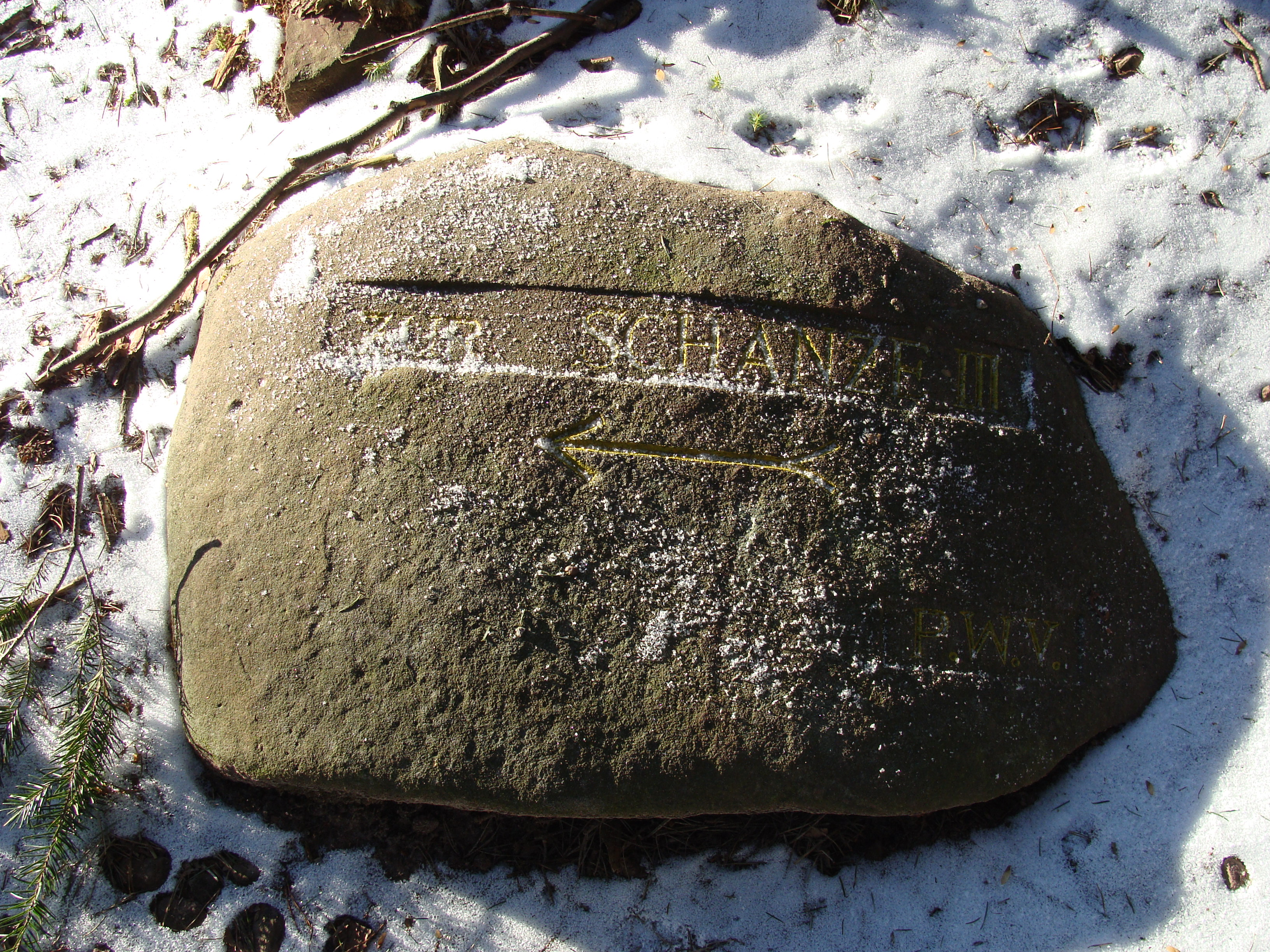
Ritterstein No. 64a: Zur Schanze III

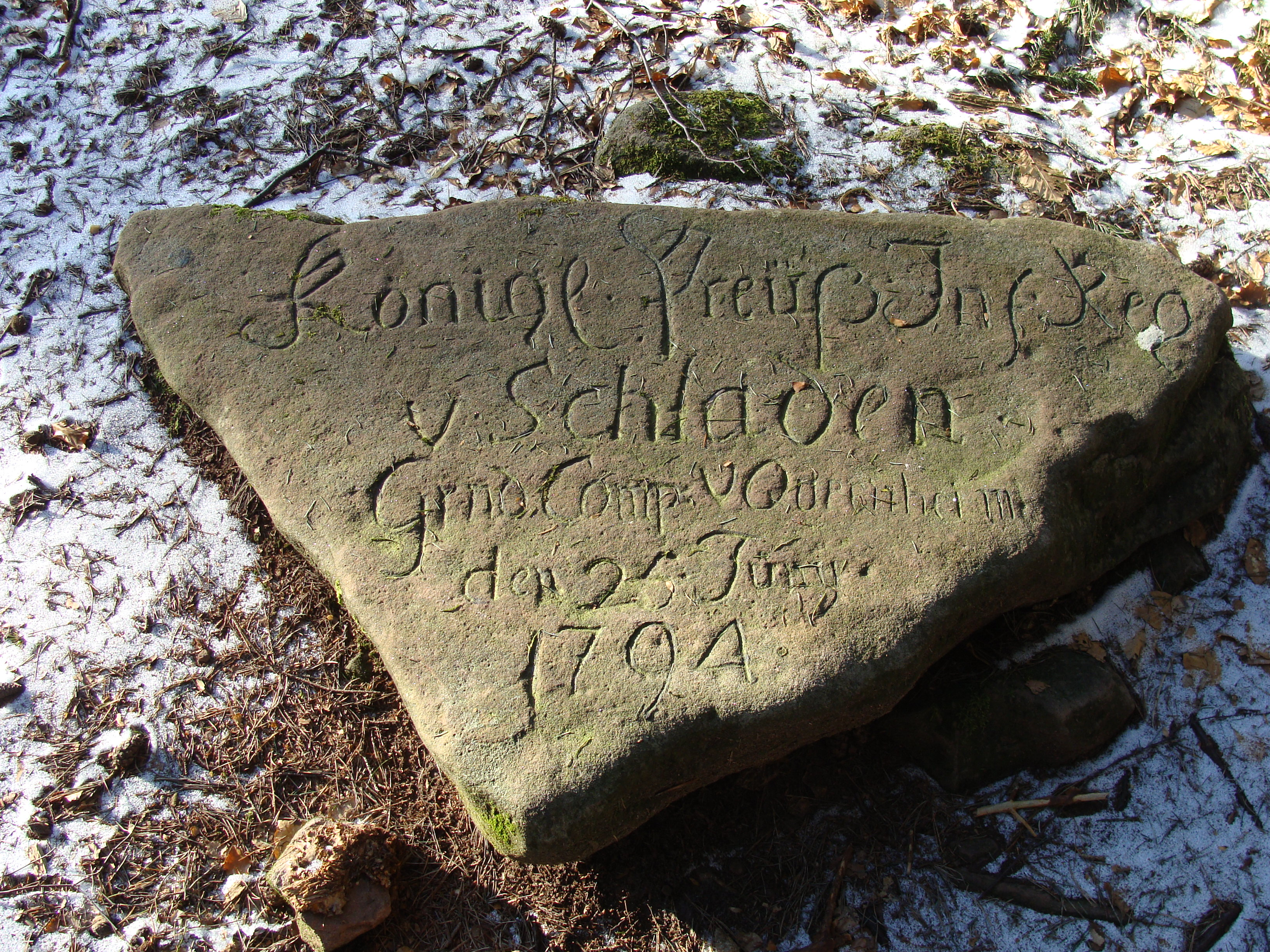
Monument to the von Schladen Infantry Regiment, 25 June 1794
