= Schänzel Tower =

Tower near Edenkoben, Germany

Coordinates: 49°17′49.4″N 8°1′34.4″E

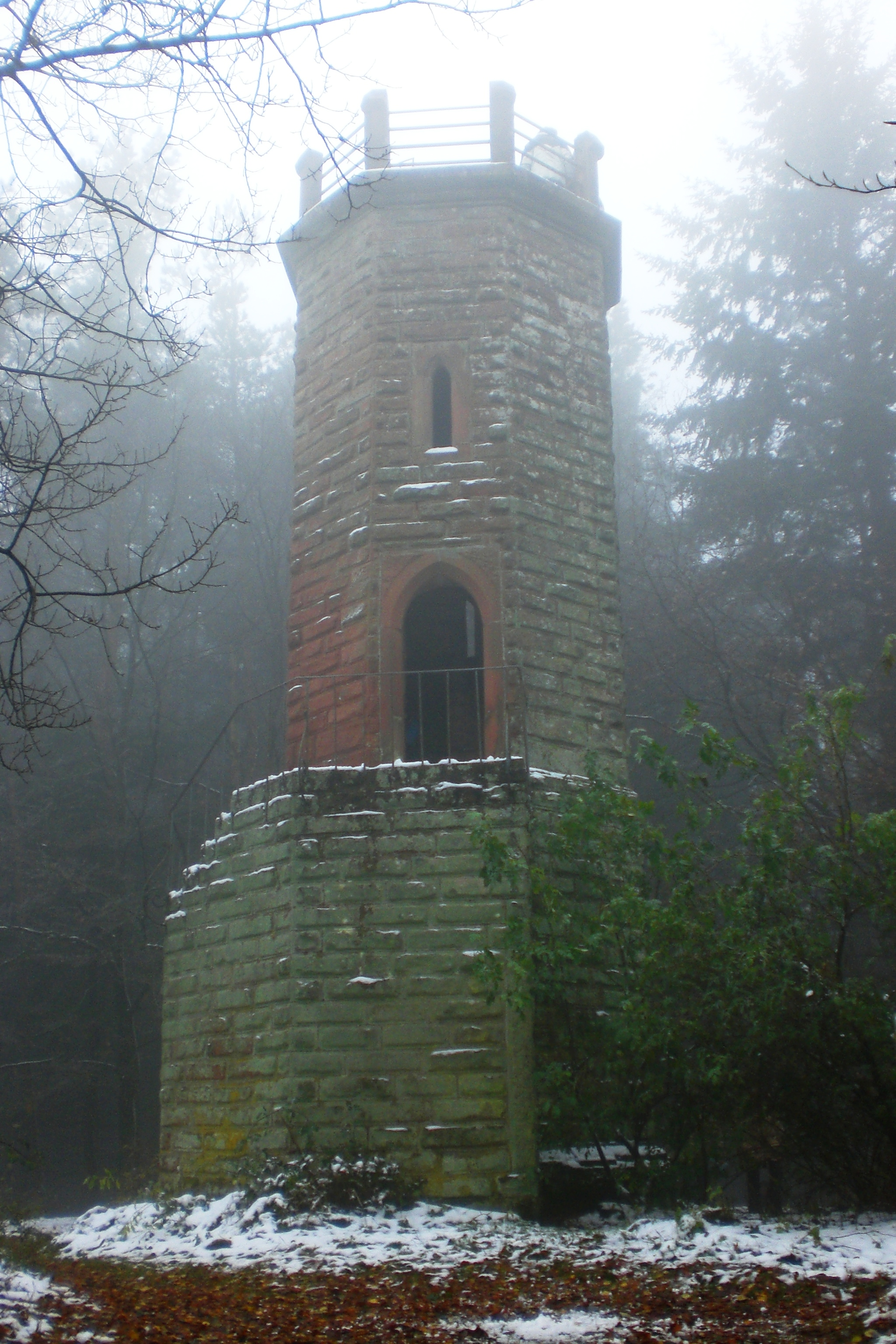
The Schänzel Tower in November 2007

The Schänzel Tower (German: Schänzelturm) is a 13-metre-high viewing tower on the Steigerkopf near Edenkoben in the county of Südliche Weinstraße in the German state of Rhineland-Palatinate. It was built in 1874 and is the highest-located tower in the mountain range of the Palatinate Forest.

== Location ==
The tower is located in the east of the Palatinate Forest, within the nature park itself, on the Steigerkopf (613.6 m above sea level (NHN)), whose summit, including the tower site, belongs to an exclave of the municipality of Gommersheim.

== Architecture ==
The octagonal tower is 13 metres high and was built of hewn bunter sandstone. The body of the structure is in two parts. The massive lower section has a perron that leads to a platform about 5 metres above the ground. Inside the narrower upper section of the tower, which is accessed from the platform from a door and has narrow, embrasure-like windows, is an internal staircase. The observation platform on the roof of the tower is protected by railings. Depending on the height of the surrounding trees, the views may be restricted.

== History ==
The Schänzel Tower was erected in 1874 a result of Germany's nationalistic fervour after her victory in the Franco-Prussian War of 1870/71. In 1894 it was dedicated to the Prussian soldiers who suffered a defeat at this location during the Battle of Trippstadt on 13 July 1794, a hundred years earlier, including the death of the Prussian commander, General Theodor Philipp von Pfau:

"...in memory of the brave Prussian warriors who died a hero's death here for the German Fatherland fighting the French invasion army on 13 July 1794" (Dem Andenken der tapferen preußischen Krieger, welche im Kampfe gegen das französische Invasionsheer am 13. Juli 1794 hier den Heldentod für das deutsche Vaterland starben).

When French Revolutionary troops conquered that part of Electoral Palatine on the left bank of the Rhine, a contingent of Prussian soldiers opposed them without success on the slopes of the Steigerkopf. Because the Prussians had built a small fieldwork (Schanze) on the mountainside, the Steigerkopf became known locally as the Schänzel; whence the name of the tower.

== Literature ==
- Walter Eitelmann (1998), Rittersteine im Pfälzerwald (in German) (4., überarbeitete und wesentlich erweiterte ed.), Neustadt/Weinstr.: Pfälzerwald-Verein, ISBN 3-00-003544-3
