= Leopold Damian =

German Nazi SA general (1895–1971)

Führer, SA-Gruppe Oberrhein
- In office 14 April 1941 – 8 May 1945

Chief, Supreme SA Court, Supreme SA Leadership (OSAF)
- In office 1 November 1937 – 13 April 1941
- SA-Stabschef: Viktor Lutze
- Preceded by: Arthur Böckenhauer

Associate Judge, Supreme Party Court
- In office 1 November 1937 – 13 April 1941
- Supreme Party Judge: Walter Buch

Additional positions
- 1942–1945: Reichstag Deputy
- 1941–1945: People's Court Judge

Personal details
- Born: Friedrich Leopold Damian; 4 April 1895 Böbingen, Rhenish Palatinate, Kingdom of Bavaria, German Empire
- Died: 19 April 1971 (aged 76) Neustadt an der Weinstraße, Rhineland-Palatinate, West Germany
- Party: Nazi Party
- Profession: Schoolteacher

Military service
- Allegiance: German Empire; Weimar Republic; Nazi Germany
- Branch/service: Royal Bavarian Army; Reichswehr; German Army
- Years of service: 1915–1920; 1939–1941
- Rank: Leutnant; Hauptmann
- Unit: 3rd Field Artillery Regiment; 3rd Reserve Infantry Regiment; Infantry Regiment 63
- Battles/wars: World War I World War II
- Awards: Iron Cross, 1st & 2nd class Clasp to the Iron Cross, 1st and 2nd class Bavaria Military Merit Order, 4th class with swords Wound Badge

Leopold Damian (4 April 1895 – 19 April 1971) was a German teacher and a Nazi Party member who became an SA-Obergruppenführer in the Sturmabteilung, the Party's paramilitary unit. He served in the Supreme SA Leadership and became Chief of the Supreme SA Court. He was also a member of the German Reichstag from 1942 to 1945.

== Early life and war service ==
Damian was born the son of a farmer, in Böbingen in the Rhenish Palatinate. He attended Volksschule and a teacher preparatory school, graduating in 1913. He became an elementary school teacher in Neustadt an der Weinstraße that year, advancing to the position of Oberlehrer (senior teacher). He entered military service with the Royal Bavarian Army in January 1915 and fought in the front lines during the First World War. Assigned to the 3rd Field Artillery Regiment, he was wounded in action in March 1916. He then completed an officer training course, was commissioned as a Leutnant in July 1917, and fought as a platoon and company commander with the 3rd Reserve Infantry Regiment until he was captured on 14 October 1918, toward the end of the war. He remained as a prisoner of war in Belgium until February 1920 when he was repatriated to Germany. For his war service, he was awarded the Iron Cross, 1st and 2nd class, and the Bavarian Military Merit Order, 4th class with swords. He was discharged from the military service, now the Reichswehr of the Weimar Republic.

== Career in the Nazi Sturmabteilung ==
Returning to civilian life, Damian resumed teaching. He joined the Nazi Party on 1 May 1929 (membership number 133,642). He served as the treasurer of the Ortsgruppe (local group) in Neustadt for the next two years. On 1 January 1930, he also joined the Sturmabteilung (SA) and was assigned to the local SA-Standarte. He advanced to Führer of SA-Standarte 18 on 1 May 1931 and, on 1 May 1935, he became the Führer of SA-Brigade 51 in Neustadt.

Damian next was assigned to the Supreme SA Leadership (OSAF) in Munich on 15 July 1936, and was attached to the Courts and Legal Office. On 15 October 1936, he was made a department head within that office and, on 1 November 1937, he was promoted to chief of the entire office. From November 1937 to April 1941, he served as the Chief of the Supreme SA Court and was also assigned as a Beisitzer (associate lay judge) on the Supreme Party Court.

In August 1939, on the eve of the outbreak of the Second World War, Damien joined the German Army with the rank of Hauptmann of reserves. He saw action as a company and battalion commander with Infantry Regiment 63 in the Polish and French campaigns. He was released from military service on 9 May 1941, having earned the Clasp to the Iron Cross, 1st and 2nd class. He then obtained an appointment as an associate lay judge of the People's Court for the duration of the war. On 14 April 1941, Damian returned to an SA field command as Führer of SA-Gruppe Oberrhein, with headquarters in Strasbourg. On 9 November 1944, he was promoted to SA-Obergruppenführer, one of the last such appointments. He retained his SA command until Germany's surrender in May 1945.

=== SA ranks ===
SA ranks
Date	Rank
1 May 1931	SA-Standartenführer
15 April 1936	SA-Oberführer
20 April 1936	SA-Brigadeführer
9 November 1938	SA-Gruppenführer
9 November 1944	SA-Obergruppenführer

== Political activity ==
Damian had failed in two bids to be elected to the Reichstag in March 1936 and April 1938. However, on 28 April 1942, he was appointed as a Reichstag deputy for electoral constituency 32 (Baden) as a replacement for a deceased member, and he retained this seat until the fall of the Nazi regime in May 1945.

Little is documented of Damian's post-war life. He died in Neustadt an der Weinstraße on 19 April 1971.

== Sources ==
- Campbell, Bruce (1998). The SA Generals and the Rise of Nazism. Lexington: University Press of Kentucky. ISBN 978-0-813-12047-8.
- Lilla, Joachim; Doring, Martin; Schulz, Andreas (2004). Statisten in Uniform: Die Mitglieder des Reichstags 1933–1945. Ein biographisches Handbuch. Unter Einbeziehung der völkischen und nationalsozialistischen Reichstagsabgeordneten ab Mai 1924. Droste. ISBN 978-3-770-05254-7.
- Miller, Michael D.; Schulz, Andreas (2015). Leaders of the Storm Troops. Vol. 1. Solihull, England: Helion & Company. ISBN 978-1-909-98287-1.
- Stockhorst, Erich (1985). 5000 Köpfe: Wer War Was im 3. Reich. Arndt. ISBN 978-3-887-41116-9.
