= Lederstrumpfbrunnen =

Public sculpture in Edenkoben, Germany

Coordinates: 49°16′57.2″N 8°7′39.2″E

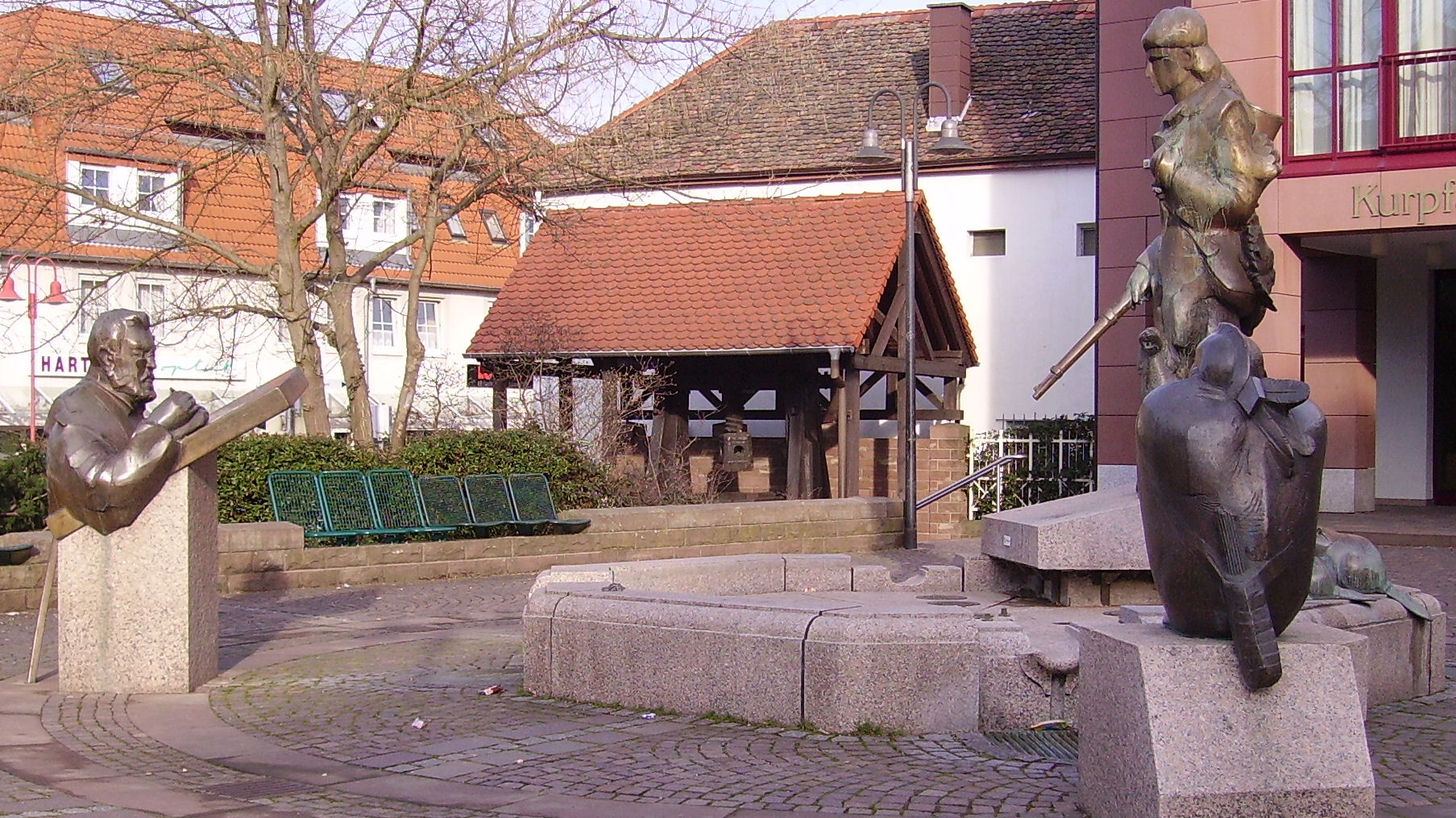
- Lederstrumpfbrunnen, fountain and sculptures
- Artist: Gernot Rumpf
- Year: 1987-90
- Subject: Johann Adam Hartmann
- Location: Edenkoben

The Lederstrumpfbrunnen (literally: leatherstocking fountain) is a fountain in the German city of Edenkoben. It commemorates the frontiersman Johann Adam Hartmann (1748-1836), who was born in this city and considered by some as a possible inspiration for the character Natty Bumppo of the Leatherstocking Tales novels by the American writer James Fenimore Cooper.

The three main sculptures around the fountain are Hartman/Bumppo depicted as a hunter with a rifle and accompanied by a dog, the Mohican chief Chingachgook (another famous character from the novels) and the artist Max Slevogt (1868-1932), who created some of the best known illustrations for the German editions of the novels.

The fountain was designed between 1987 and 1990 by the German sculptor Gernot Rumpf.
