= Roschbach =

- Municipality
- Coat of arms

- Location of Roschbach within Südliche Weinstraße district
- Interactive map of Roschbach
- Location within Germany Location within Rhineland-Palatinate
- Coordinates: 49°14′52″N 8°07′05″E
- Country: Germany
- State: Rhineland-Palatinate
- District: Südliche Weinstraße
- Municipal assoc.: Edenkoben

Government
  - Mayor (2019–24): Albrt Birkmeyer

Area
  - Total: 3.45 km^{2} (1.33 sq mi)
- Elevation: 166 m (545 ft)

Population (2025-12-31)
  - Total: 850
  - Density: 250/km^{2} (640/sq mi)
- Time zone: UTC+01:00 (CET)
  - Summer (DST): UTC+02:00 (CEST)
- Postal codes: 76835
- Dialling codes: 06323
- Vehicle registration: SÜW
- Website: www.roschbach.de

Roschbach (German pronunciation: [ˈʁɔʃbax]) is a municipality in Südliche Weinstraße district, in Rhineland-Palatinate, western Germany.
