= Edenkoben (Verbandsgemeinde) =

Verbandsgemeinde in Südliche Weinstraße, Germany

- Verbandsgemeinde
- Location of Edenkoben within Südliche Weinstraße district
- Interactive map of Edenkoben
- Location within Germany Location within Rhineland-Palatinate
- Coordinates: 49°17′N 8°08′E
- Country: Germany
- State: Rhineland-Palatinate
- District: Südliche Weinstraße
- Seat: Edenkoben
- Subdivisions: 16 municipalities

Area
  - Total: 119.67 km^{2} (46.20 sq mi)

Population (2025-12-31)
  - Total: 20,728
  - Density: 173.21/km^{2} (448.61/sq mi)
- Time zone: UTC+01:00 (CET)
  - Summer (DST): UTC+02:00 (CEST)
- Website: www.vg-edenkoben.de

Edenkoben is a Verbandsgemeinde ("collective municipality") in the Südliche Weinstraße district, in Rhineland-Palatinate, Germany. The seat of the municipality is in Edenkoben.

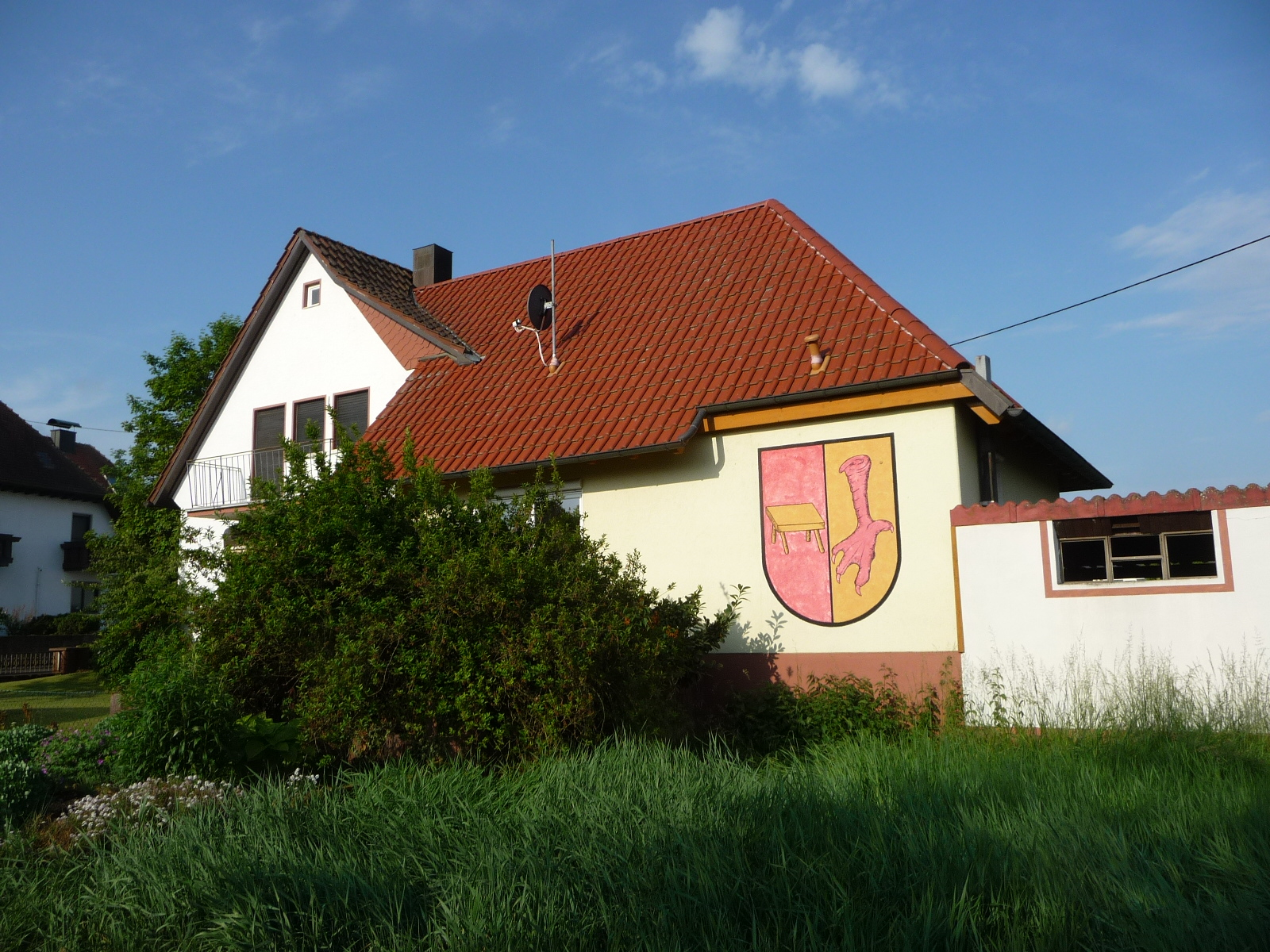

== History ==
The Verbandsgemeinde was founded in 1972. It belonged to the Regierungsbezirk Rheinhessen-Pfalz, before its dissolution in 2000. It was expanded with the municipalities of the Verbandsgemeinde Maikammer in July 2014, but this merger was reverted by the constitutional court of Rhineland-Palatinate in June 2015.

== Local municipalities ==
The Verbandsgemeinde Edenkoben consists of the following Ortsgemeinden ("local municipalities"):

1. Altdorf
2. Böbingen
3. Burrweiler
4. Edenkoben
5. Edesheim
6. Flemlingen
7. Freimersheim
8. Gleisweiler
9. Gommersheim
10. Großfischlingen
11. Hainfeld
12. Kleinfischlingen
13. Rhodt unter Rietburg
14. Roschbach
15. Venningen
16. Weyher in der Pfalz
