= Kleinfischlingen =

- Municipality
- Coat of arms

- Location of Kleinfischlingen within Südliche Weinstraße district
- Interactive map of Kleinfischlingen
- Location within Germany Location within Rhineland-Palatinate
- Coordinates: 49°15′49″N 8°11′16″E
- Country: Germany
- State: Rhineland-Palatinate
- District: Südliche Weinstraße
- Municipal assoc.: Edenkoben

Government
  - Mayor (2019–24): Regina von Nida

Area
  - Total: 2.52 km^{2} (0.97 sq mi)
- Elevation: 131 m (430 ft)

Population (2025-12-31)
  - Total: 324
  - Density: 129/km^{2} (333/sq mi)
- Time zone: UTC+01:00 (CET)
  - Summer (DST): UTC+02:00 (CEST)
- Postal codes: 67483
- Dialling codes: 06347
- Vehicle registration: SÜW
- Website: www.kleinfischlingen.de

Kleinfischlingen is a municipality in Südliche Weinstraße district, in Rhineland-Palatinate, western Germany.
