= Natty Bumppo =

Fictional character created by James Fenimore Cooper

- Leatherstocking Tales character
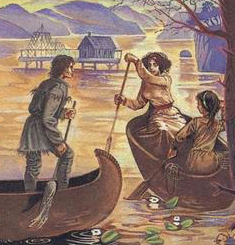
- Natty Bumppo (left) from a 1989 Soviet stamp on themes from Leatherstocking Tales
- First appearance: The Pioneers
- Last appearance: The Deerslayer
- Created by: James Fenimore Cooper

In-universe information
- Full name: Nathaniel Bumppo
- Alias: Hawkeye among many others
- Gender: Male
- Occupation: Scout, huntsman, explorer

Nathaniel "Natty" Bumppo is a fictional character and the protagonist of James Fenimore Cooper's pentalogy of novels known as the Leatherstocking Tales. He appears throughout the series as an archetypal American ranger, and has been portrayed many times in a variety of media in popular culture.

== Fictional biography ==
Natty Bumppo, the child of white parents who died when he was young, grew up among Delaware Indians and was educated by Moravian Christians. In adulthood, he is a near-fearless warrior skilled in many weapons, chiefly the long rifle. He is most often shown alongside his Mohican foster brother Chingachgook and nephew Uncas.

== Novels ==
Bumppo is featured in a series of novels by James Fenimore Cooper collectively called the Leatherstocking Tales. The novels in the collection are as follows:

Publication Date	Story Dates	Title	Subtitle
1841	1740–1755	The Deerslayer	The First War Path
1826	1757	The Last of the Mohicans	A Narrative of 1757
1840	1758–1759	The Pathfinder	The Inland Sea
1823	1793	The Pioneers	The Sources of the Susquehanna; A Descriptive Tale
1827	1804	The Prairie	A Tale

The tales recount significant events in Natty Bumppo's life from 1740 to 1806.

== Aliases ==
Before his appearance in The Deerslayer, Bumppo went by the aliases "Straight-Tongue", "The Pigeon", and the "Lap-Ear". After obtaining his first rifle, he gained the sobriquet "Deerslayer". He is subsequently known as "Hawkeye" and "La Longue Carabine" in The Last of the Mohicans, as "Pathfinder" in The Pathfinder, or The Inland Sea, as "Leatherstocking" (from which the series' title is drawn) in The Pioneers, and as "the trapper" in The Prairie.

== Portrayal ==
Bumppo has been portrayed most often in adaptations of The Last of the Mohicans. He was portrayed by Harry Lorraine in the 1920 film version, by Harry Carey in the 1932 film serial version, by Randolph Scott in the 1936 film version, by Kenneth Ives in the 1971 BBC serial, by Steve Forrest in the 1977 TV movie and by Daniel Day-Lewis in the 1992 film version.

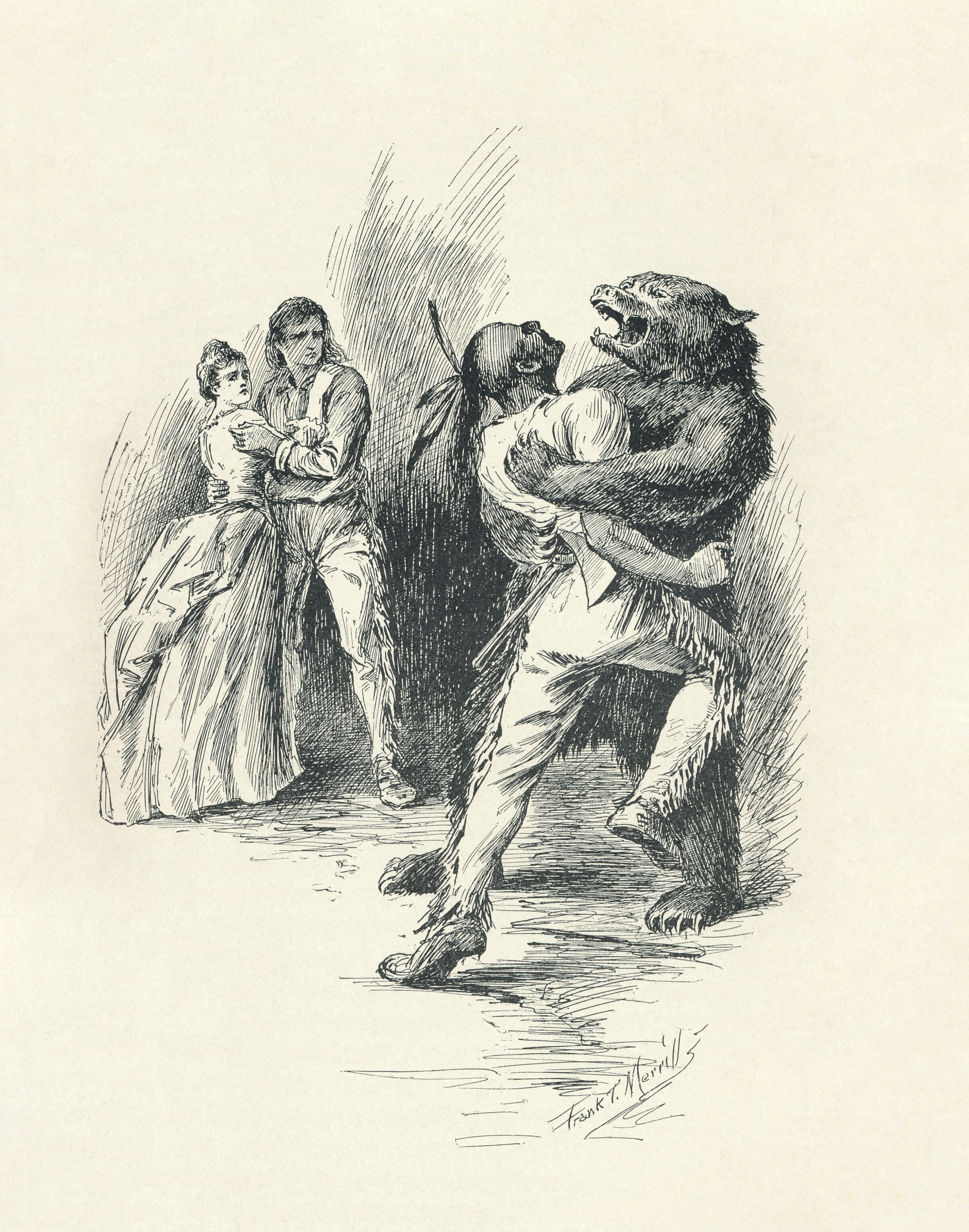
Illustration from 1896 edition of The Last of the Mohicans, by F.T. Merrill. The drawing occurs when Hawk-eye attacks Magua in the cave where Alice is held captive.

Day-Lewis received a BAFTA Film Award nomination for Best Actor in 1993, won an Evening Standard British Film Award for Best Actor in 1993, and won an ALFS Award for British Actor of the Year in 1993 for his interpretation of the character. For the 1992 film, director Michael Mann changed the character's name to Nathaniel Poe, fearing audiences would laugh at "Natty Bumppo". In this adaptation, Poe reveals that his parents were originally indentured servants from the Colony of Virginia, though their deaths are not explained.The character is also portrayed as the adopted son of Chingachgook (who found him with a group of French trappers) and brother of Uncas.

Adaptations of The Deerslayer have seen Bumppo played by Emil Mamelok in the 1920 film The Deerslayer and Chingachgook, by Bruce Kellogg in the 1943 film, by Lex Barker in the 1957 film, and by Steve Forrest in the 1978 TV movie.

Adaptions of The Pathfinder have seen Bumppo played by Paul Massie in the 1973 5-part BBC mini-series and Kevin Dillon in the 1996 TV movie.

Additionally, he was portrayed by Michael O'Shea in the 1947 film Last of the Redskins, George Montgomery in the 1950 film The Iroquois Trail, by John Hart in the 1957 TV series Hawkeye and the Last of the Mohicans, by Hellmut Lange in the 1969 German TV series Die Lederstrumpferzählungen, by Cliff DeYoung in the 1984 PBS mini-series The Leatherstocking Tales (which compressed The Deerslayer, The Last of the Mohicans, and The Pathfinder into four episodes), and by Lee Horsley in the 1994 TV series Hawkeye.

== In popular culture ==
=== Fiction ===
- Bumppo appears as a character in John Myers Myers' novel Silverlock (1949).
- The character Benjamin Franklin "Hawkeye" Pierce, from M*A*S*H, takes his nickname from the Native American name given to Natty Bumppo. In both the TV series and the original Richard Hooker novel on which it is based, it is stated that The Last of the Mohicans is the only book Pierce's father had ever read.
- Bumppo is known as Dan'l "Hawkeye" Bonner in Sara Donati's novel series, beginning with Into the Wilderness, meant as a sequel to The Leatherstocking books. The series centers on Hawkeye and Cora's son, Nathaniel Bonner.
- Bumppo is featured in the comic book series Jack of Fables, both in name and as "Hawkeye", along with Slue-Foot Sue (Pecos Bill's first wife).
- Bumppo is referred to in the graphic novel series The League of Extraordinary Gentlemen as being part of the 18th-century incarnation of the league.
- Near the end of Mississippi Jack, the fifth in the best-selling Bloody Jack series of female adventures by L.A. Meyer, an adopted white Shawnee called Lightfoot, a rifleman who always travels with his native Shawnee "brother", reveals his white surname to be "Bumpus" in an obvious tribute to Cooper's Natty Bumppo. Thinly veiled or unveiled characters from the history and culture of the time of the Leatherstocking novels is a repeating feature of the Bloody Jack book series.
- The Marvel Comics character Hawkeye takes his name from Natty Bumppo, whom he portrayed during his time as a carnival marksman before becoming a superhero.
- The character Gus Brannhard adopts a Fuzzy and names him Natty Bumppo in H. Beam Piper's novel Fuzzies and Other People (ISBN 0-441-26176-0).
- Song of the Mohicans, written by Paul Block (Bantam Books, 1985, ISBN 978-0553565584), is a direct sequel to The Last of the Mohicans. Taking up the story a few days after Uncas' death and burial, it recounts the adventures of Hawkeye and Chingachgook as they travel north to discover the connection between an Oneida brave and the Mohican tribe, and whether a sachem truly holds the key to the ultimate fate of the Mohicans.
- Natty Bumppo is featured in the Marvel comic Deadpool Killustrated, as part of a group of time-traveling heroes (Beowulf, Hua Mulan, and Sherlock Holmes and his partner Dr. Watson), intent on stopping Deadpool from killing all literary characters.
- Tinker, a major character in Amor Towles' novel, Rules of Civility, wants to be Natty Bumppo for the day.
- There is an intelligent dog named Natty Bumppo in John Brunner's novel "Shockwave Rider".
- Natty Bumppo appears as a character in Diana Gabaldon's eighth Outlander series novel, Written in My Own Heart's Blood.
- Natty Bumppo, referred to as “Nasty” Bumppo, makes an appearance in Thomas King’s 1993 novel Green Grass, Running Water, in a scene in which he sets out to kill Old Woman, whom he calls “Chingachgook.”
- Natty Bumppo, referred to also as Davey Shipman, is a character in Lauren Groff's novel The Monsters of Templeton, along with Chingachgook and James Franklin Temple, a version of the author James Fenimore Cooper.
- Natty Bumppo is referenced as a nickname in Leif Enger's Peace Like A River.

=== Mascots ===
University of Iowa's mascot, the Hawkeye was taken from The Last of the Mohicans novel.

=== Music ===
Natty Bumppo was the name of several pop music bands in the 1970s, including bands from Dayton, Ohio, and central Utah.

=== People ===
Natty Bumppo is the name of the author of The Columbus Book Of Euchre and House Of Evil.

=== Postage stamps ===
In 1989, the Soviet Union issued a series of postage stamps depicting themes of Cooper's The Leatherstocking Tales.

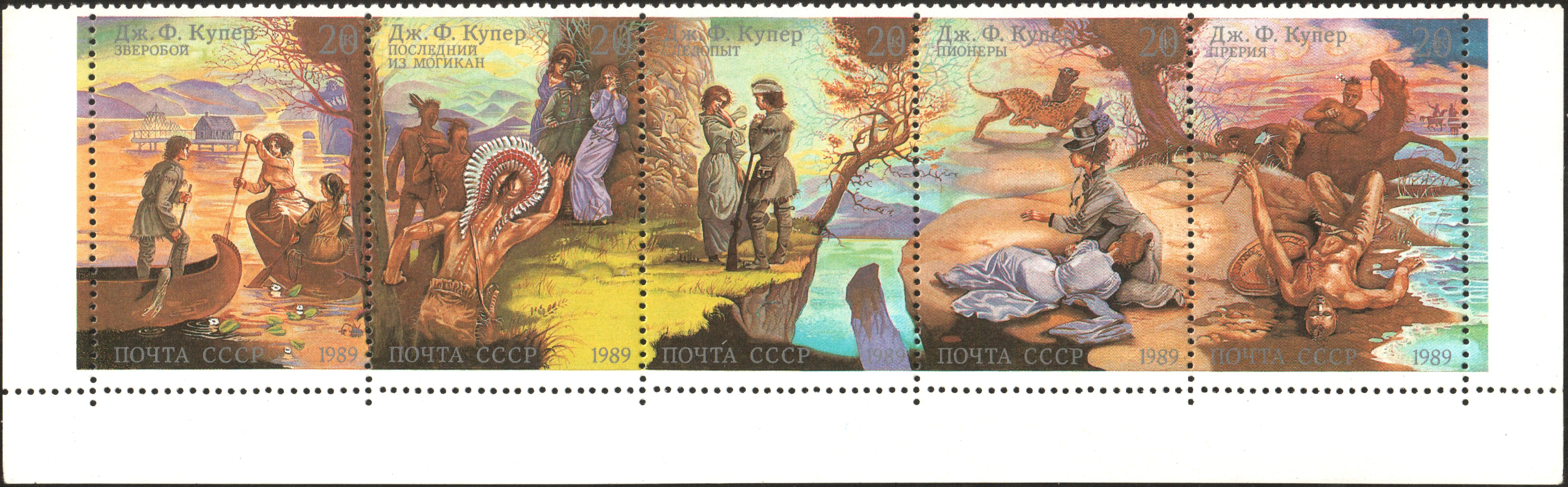
1989 Soviet postage stamp series depicting The Leatherstocking Tales

=== Sculptures and memorials ===
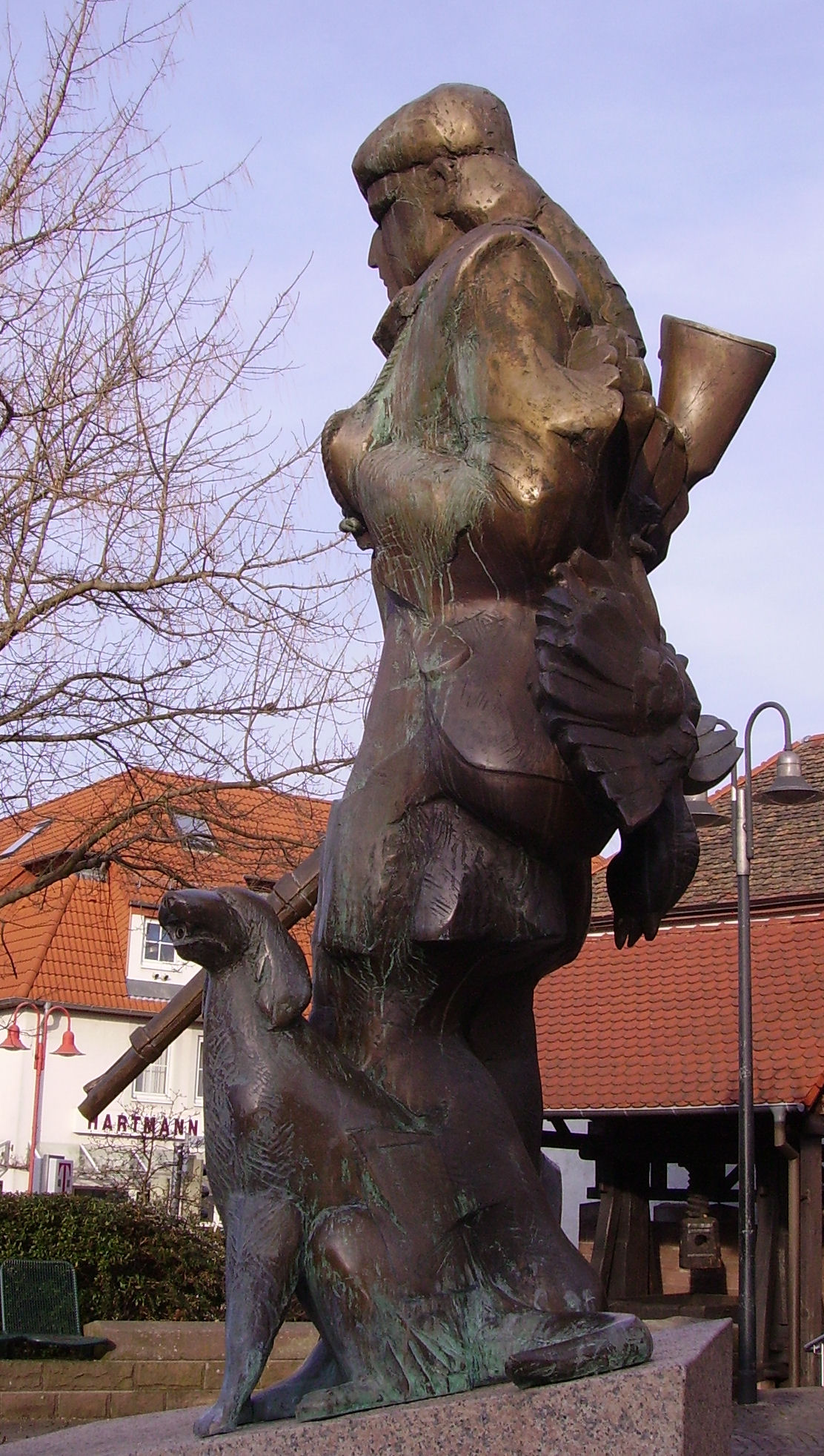
Natty Bumppo sculpture in Edenkoben, Germany

- The Lederstrumpfbrunnen (Leatherstocking fountain) in Edenkoben (Germany) contains a life-sized statue of Natty Bumppo
- The British sculptor Thomas Nicholls designed a wooden sculpture of Natty Bumppo as part of an ensemble of six figures of American literature. The ensemble belongs to the interior design of Two Temple Place, London.

=== Media ===
- In Total War: Warhammer II the Skaven unit roster features a specialty unit named Natty Buboe’s Sharpshooters, who utilize long rifles to fire projectiles at an exceptionally long range. This unit also appeared on the tabletop in Warhammer Armies: Skaven (7th Edition).
