= Rosina Lippi =

American writer (born 1956)

Rosina Lippi-Green
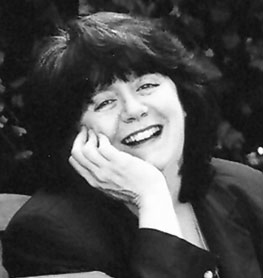
- Born: Rosina Lippi; January 14, 1956 (age 70); Chicago, Illinois, U.S.
- Education: University of Illinois Chicago; Princeton University (PhD)
- Occupations: Novelist, linguist
- Writing career
- Pen name: Rosina Lippi-Green, Rosina Lippi, Sara Donati
- Period: 1997–present
- Genres: Romance, historical
- Subject: Linguistics
- Website: www.rosinalippi.com

Rosina Lippi-Green (née Rosina Lippi; born January 14, 1956) is an American writer. She writes under the names Rosina Lippi-Green (linguistics), Rosina Lippi (literary and contemporary fiction), and Sara Donati (historical fiction).

== Biography ==
Lippi-Green was born Rosina Lippi on January 14, 1956, in Chicago, Illinois, United States. Her father was an Italian emigrant, and she has ancestry of different European countries.

At seventeen she went to Austria on an American Field Service scholarship. Upon graduating from high school, she went to teacher's college in Vorarlberg, Austria. She attended the University of Illinois at Chicago. She earned a PhD in linguistics from Princeton University in 1987, with a dissertation entitled, "Variation leading to change in rural Alemannic: the dialect of Grossdorf in Vorarlberg, Austria", and taught linguistics for twelve years, notably at the University of Michigan. Her best known linguistic work is English with an Accent (Lippi-Green 1997, 2011), which is now in its second edition.

In her spare time, she is a fiber artist whose work has been published in Quilting Arts magazine. An interview with Linda Richards for January Magazine was published in March 2000. In 2013 she took an interest in polymer clay arts and began making jewelry.

== Bibliography ==
=== Rosina Lippi-Green ===
Her linguistics works include:

- English with an Accent: Language, Ideology, and Discrimination in the United States (1997, 2011)
- Language, Ideology, and Language Change in Early Modern German (1994)
- Recent Developments in Germanic Linguistics (1992)

=== Rosina Lippi ===
In 1998, she published Homestead a novel set in an isolated Austrian village, for which she won the 1999 Hemingway Foundation/PEN Award and was shortlisted for the Orange Prize.

The Orange Prize (Britain) 2001 shortlist: Homestead by Rosina Lippi reviewed by Dylan Evans.

Several reviews for Homestead by Rosina Lippi can also be found in The New York Times Book Review, The Hemingway Review and the Washington Post.

Homestead (review) by Brigitte Frase The New York Times Book Review May 9, 1999

"PEN/Hemingway Award 1999" The Hemingway Review, Vol. 19, 1999: 155

"Shaped by Time, Place and Family: Fictions About Farthest Austria" Review of Homestead by Carolyn See. The Washington Post May 29, 1998

- Homestead ISBN 0-395-97771-1 and ISBN 978-0-395-97771-2

She has also written a contemporary novel entitled Tied to the Tracks, a romantic comedy set in a southern college. In Australia, this novel is published under the name Sara Donati which is more well known in that country.

- Tied to the Tracks (2006) ISBN (Aust)- 978 1 86325 486 1 (Paperback) and ISBN (Aust)- 1 86325 486 2 (Paperback)
- The Pajama Girls of Lambert Square (2008) ISBN 0-399-15466-3 and ISBN 978-0-399-15466-9

=== Sara Donati ===
Her historical fiction, published under the name Sara Donati, begins with Hawkeye from The Last of the Mohicans and investigates the life of his immediate family and descendants in the Endless Forests of New York State from 1792. These books include:

- Into the Wilderness (1998) ISBN (Aust)- 1 86325 179 0 (Paperback)

Into the Wilderness commences in the fictional town of Paradise on the west branch of the Sacandanga River, New York State 1792. Nathaniel Bonner, son of Hawkeye meets spinster Elizabeth Middleton, an Englishwoman determined to start a school. The townsfolk consist of free African-Americans, slaves and Kahnyenkehaka (Mowhawk) as well as white Americans. It's an adventure and a love story with many twists and turns and a surprising visit from characters from Diana Gabaldon's Outlander (or Cross Stitch in Australia) series. Review can be found in the July 19, 1998, issue of Booklist.

- Dawn on a Distant Shore (2000) ISBN (Aust) - 1 86325 269 X (Paperback)

The story of the Bonners continue, this time with the family being taken by force to Scotland due to long lost family connections to the Earl of Carryck and his need for an heir to his Earldom.

- Lake in the Clouds (2002) ISBN (Aust) - 1 86325 278 9 (Paperback)

The story of the Bonners continue many years later in 1802, this time surrounding Nathaniel's daughter Hannah who is also half Kahnyenkehaka (Mohawk), who has been studying medicine with the local doctor Richard Todd. Dr Todd has arranged for her to study at the Kine-Pox Institute in New-York City headed by Dr Valentine Simon. Meanwhile, there is an escaped slave with connections to a Paradise family that needs help and the vindictive Jemima Southern sets out to destroy Hannah Bonner.

- Fire Along the Sky (2004) ISBN (Aust) - 1 86325 279 7 (Paperback)

Once again the story continues after several years, commencing in 1812 at the outbreak of the War of 1812. The Bonner family is separated on either side of the American/Canadian border – both the white family and the Kahnyenkehaka (Mohawk) families. Nathaniel and Elizabeth's eldest son leaves to fight with his cousin Blue-Jay only to be injured and captured and taken to Nut Island in Canada, a fort held by the invading British. Hannah and her cousin Jennet from Scotland head to Nut Island to help their male family members, resulting in dire consequences.

- Queen of Swords (2006) ISBN (Aust) - 978 1 86325 281 1 (Paperback) and ISBN (Aust) - 1 86325 281 9 (Paperback)

An immediate continuation of the story has Hannah Bonner and her half brother Luke Bonner searching for Jennet who has been abducted from Nut Island. Their search is successful, but then discover that her child (and Luke's) has been taken by a ruthless man (Honore Poiterin) to New Orleans, which is soon under attack by British Forces. The family has many obstactles to overcome and then have to live through the Battle of New Orleans led by Andrew Jackson to save the city from the British. An insightful look at the battle from civilian's point of view, white, black, red and Creole.

- The Endless Forest (2010) ISBN 978-0-553-80526-0

Book Six concludes the story of the Bonner family. It is set in the town of Paradise in 1824, where the reappearance of Jemima Southern is perceived as a threat to her daughter Martha Kirby and stepdaughter Callie Wilde.

- The Gilded Hour (2015) ISBN 978-0-425-27181-0

Descendants of the Bonners in New York City in the 1880s, including doctors Anna and Sophie Savard who are distant cousins. Issues that were prominent in this time such as the influx of orphans into the City and the effect of the Comstock Act on women's health feature prominently.

The Gilded Hour (review) by Melinda Bargreen

Special to The Seattle Times August 28, 2015
