= Freimersheim, Südliche Weinstraße =

Freimersheim
- Municipality
- Coat of arms

- Location of Freimersheim within Südliche Weinstraße district
- Interactive map of Freimersheim
- Location within Germany Location within Rhineland-Palatinate
- Coordinates: 49°16′16″N 8°13′35″E
- Country: Germany
- State: Rhineland-Palatinate
- District: Südliche Weinstraße
- Municipal assoc.: Edenkoben

Government
  - Mayor (2019–24): Daniel Salm

Area
  - Total: 5.37 km^{2} (2.07 sq mi)
- Elevation: 131 m (430 ft)

Population (2025-12-31)
  - Total: 1,028
  - Density: 191/km^{2} (496/sq mi)
- Time zone: UTC+01:00 (CET)
  - Summer (DST): UTC+02:00 (CEST)
- Postal codes: 67482
- Dialling codes: 06347
- Vehicle registration: SÜW
- Website: www.freimersheim.de

Freimersheim (German pronunciation: [ˈfʁaɪmɐshaɪm]) is a municipality in Südliche Weinstraße district, in Rhineland-Palatinate, western Germany.
