= Großfischlingen =

- Municipality
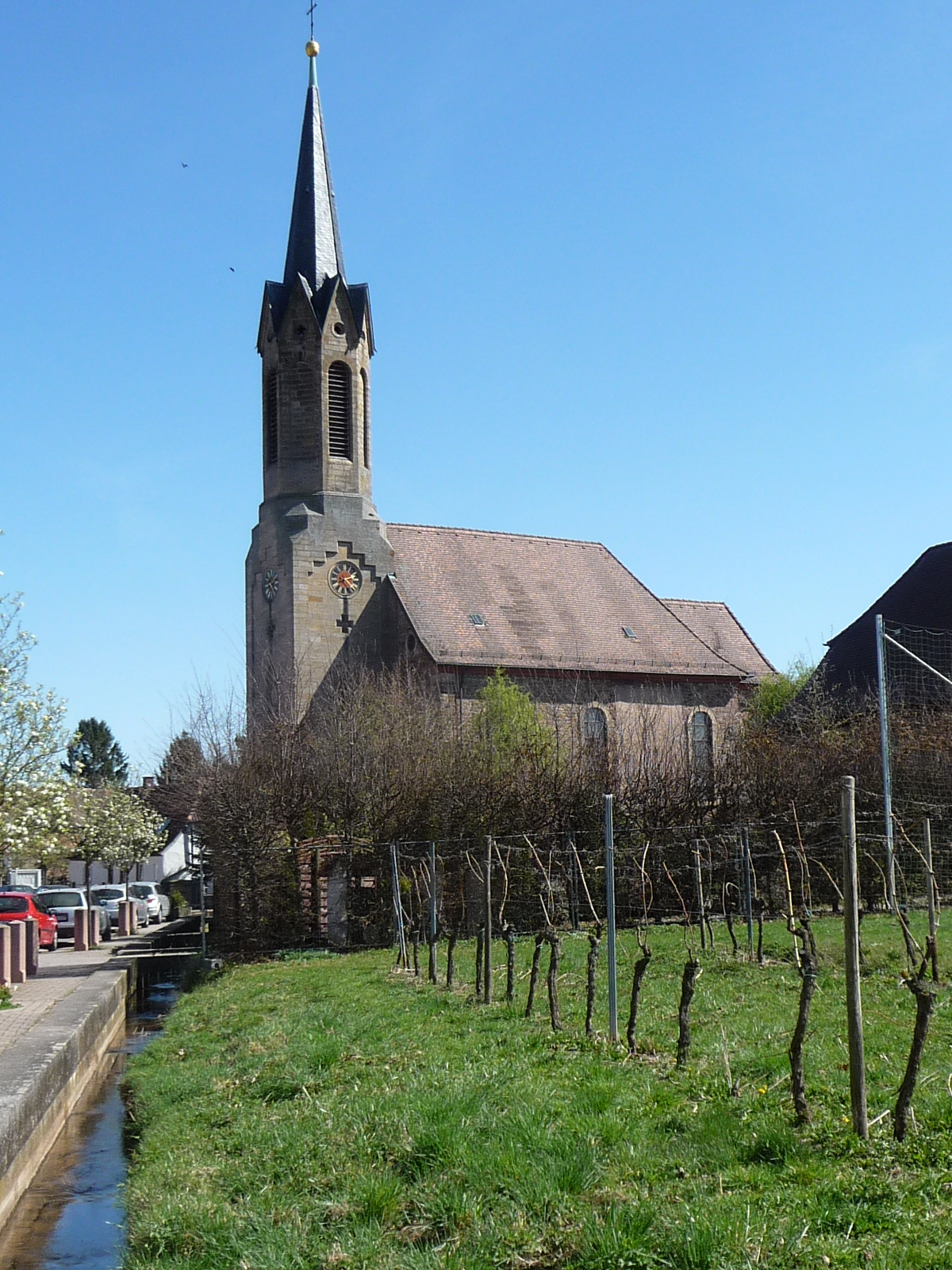
- Großfischlingen church next to a vineyard

- Coat of arms

- Location of Großfischlingen within Südliche Weinstraße district
- Interactive map of Großfischlingen
- Location within Germany Location within Rhineland-Palatinate
- Coordinates: 49°16′11″N 8°10′32″E
- Country: Germany
- State: Rhineland-Palatinate
- District: Südliche Weinstraße
- Municipal assoc.: Edenkoben

Government
  - Mayor (2019–24): Daniel Köbler

Area
  - Total: 4.31 km^{2} (1.66 sq mi)
- Elevation: 132 m (433 ft)

Population (2025-12-31)
  - Total: 600
  - Density: 140/km^{2} (360/sq mi)
- Time zone: UTC+01:00 (CET)
  - Summer (DST): UTC+02:00 (CEST)
- Postal codes: 67483
- Dialling codes: 06323
- Vehicle registration: SÜW
- Website: www.grossfischlingen.de

Großfischlingen is a municipality in Südliche Weinstraße district, in Rhineland-Palatinate, western Germany.
