= Gernot Rumpf =

German sculptor (1941–2025)

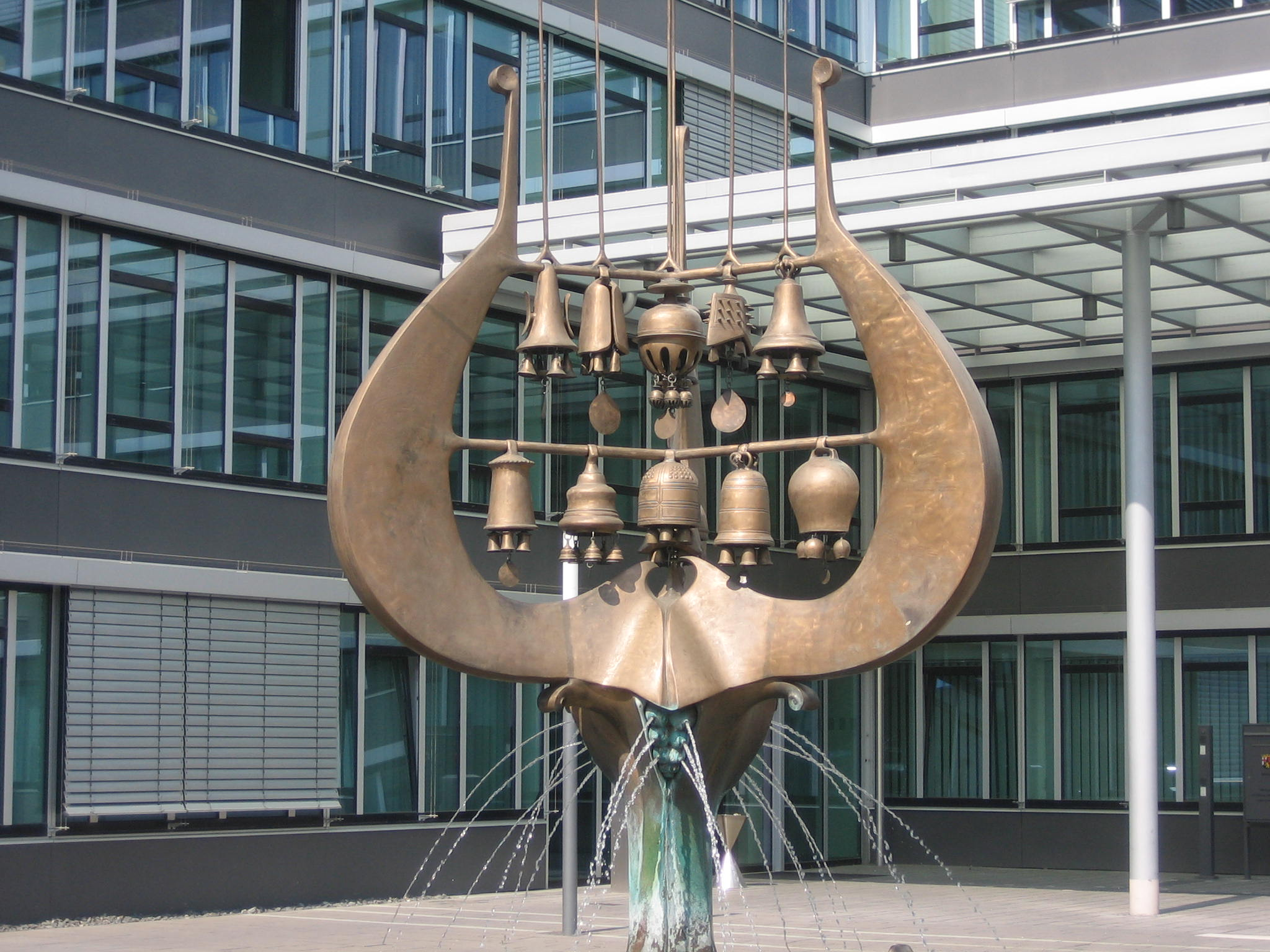
- Sculpture of Beamtenwecker (civil servants alarm clock), bronze, 1974/75, in front of ministry of culture and education, Mainz
- Born: 17 April 1941; Kaiserslautern, Gau Westmark, Germany
- Died: 20 January 2025 (aged 83)
- Education: Academy of Fine Arts, Munich
- Known for: Sculpture

Gernot Rumpf (17 April 1941 – 20 January 2025) was a German sculptor known for his fountains and other bronze sculptures, with the Palatinate and biblical motifs. These can be seen not only in German cities, but also in Jerusalem and Tokyo. A part of his work came under the artistic collaboration of his wife Barbara Rumpf.

== Life and career ==
Born in Kaiserlautern, Rumpf studied at the Academy of Fine Arts, Munich from 1964 until 1970 under the guidance of Josef Henselmann and Hans Ladner. In 1965 he opened his own workshop for bronze casting. 1967 to 1969 there was a further development supported by the Studienstiftung des deutschen Volkes (German National Academic Foundation).

In 1973 Rumpf received a teaching assignment from the Kaiserslautern University of Technology, that was converted in 1979 to a professorship. In 1980 and 1983 he held a visiting professorship at the International Summer Academy in Salzburg.

Rumpf died on 20 January 2025, at the age of 83.

== Selected works in public space ==
- 1973: Paradiesbrunnen, bronze, Kartoffelmarkt, Neustadt an der Weinstraße
- 1974: Glockenbaum, Beamtenwecker vernacular: civil servants alarm clock, bronze, in front of ministry of culture and education, Mainz
- 1984: Saint Ludger, bronze shrine, Essen-Werden St Ludger's basilica
- 1985: Rossmarktbrunnen, bronze fountain, Alzey Rossmarkt
- 1985: Geißbockbrunnen, depicts the Deidesheim billy goat auction, Deidesheim
- 1989: Löwenbrunnen, Jerusalem
- 1990: Lederstrumpfbrunnen
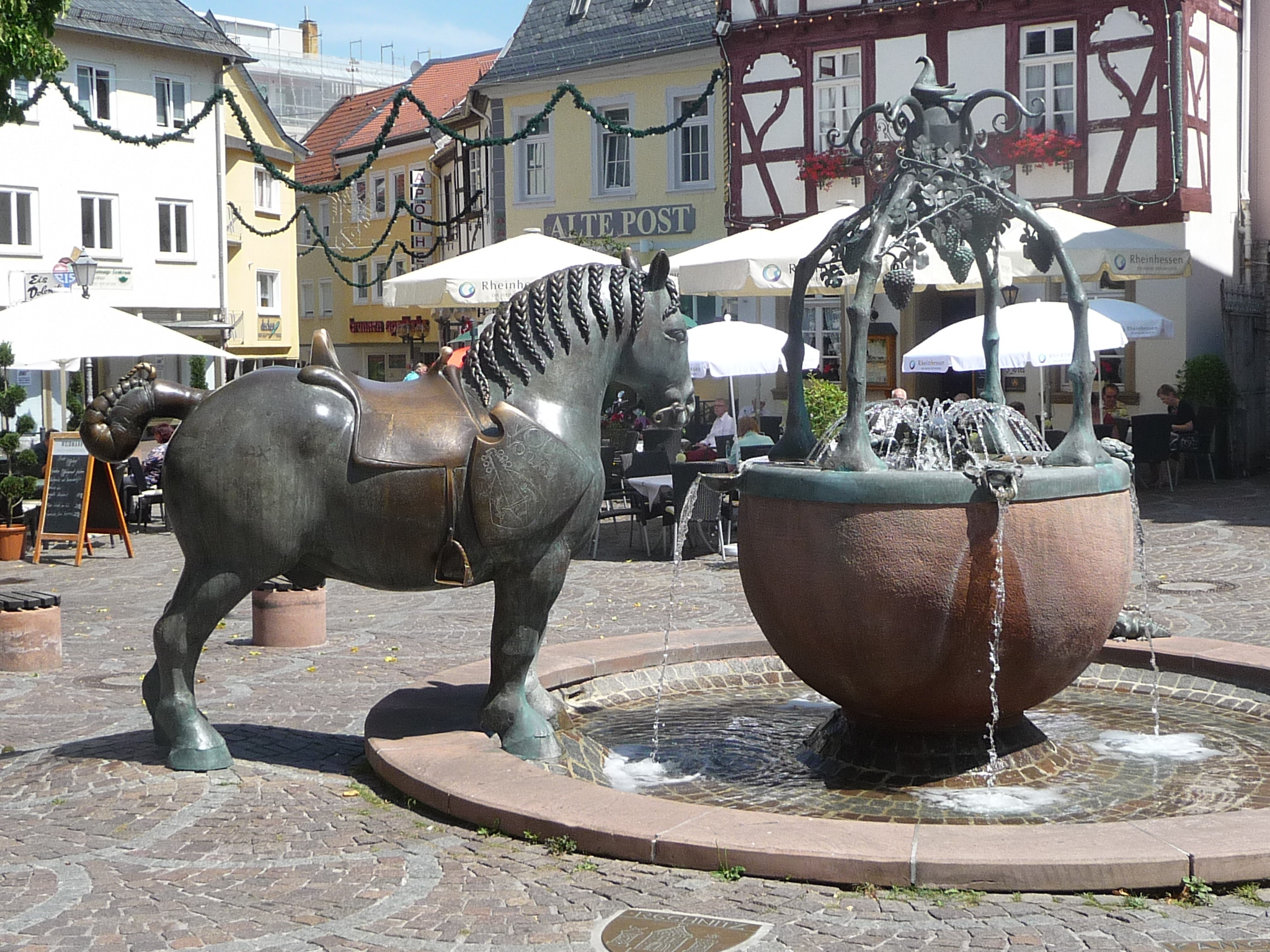
Rossmarktbrunnen, Alzey

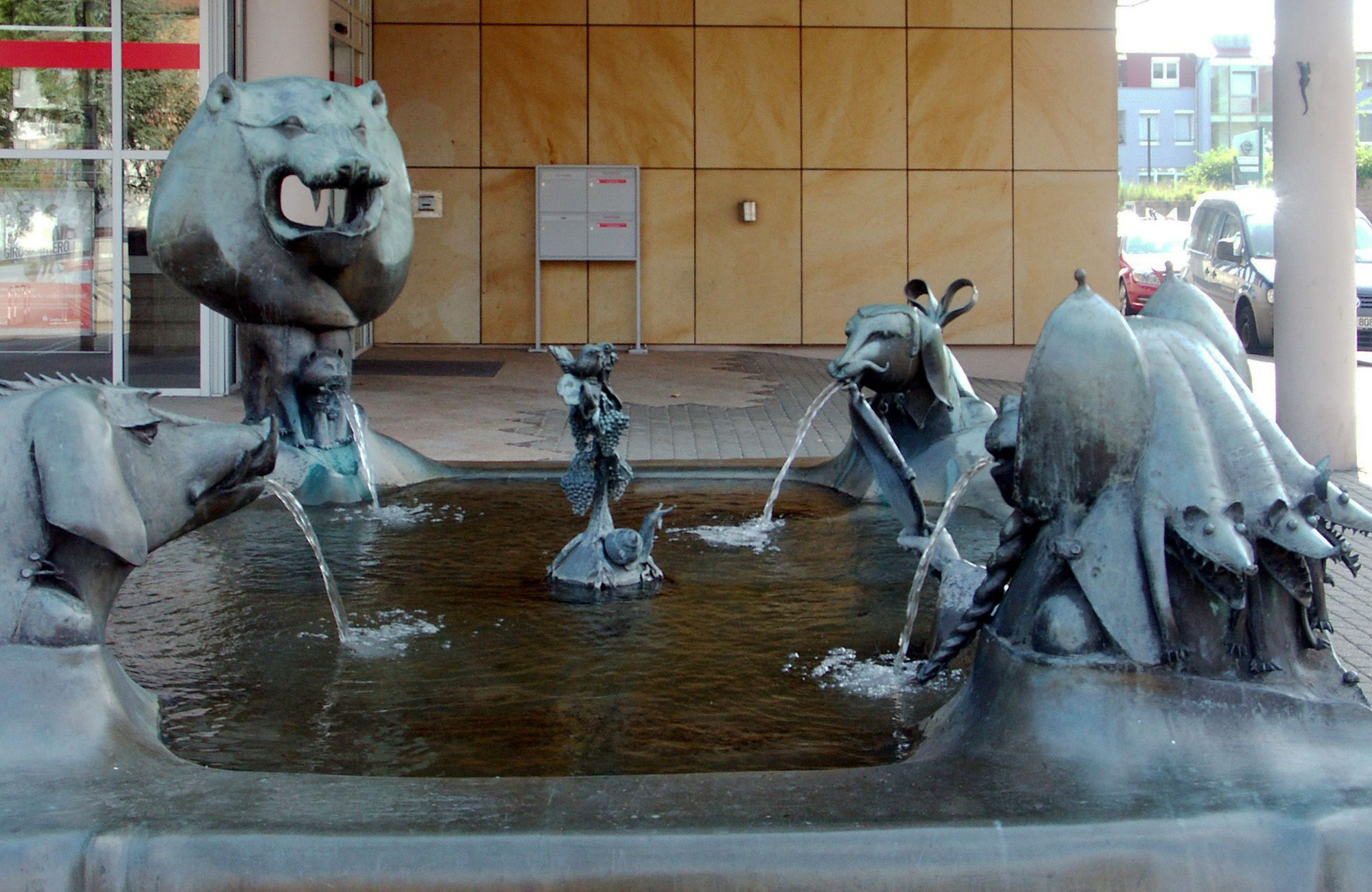
Weinbrunnen, Bad Bergzabern

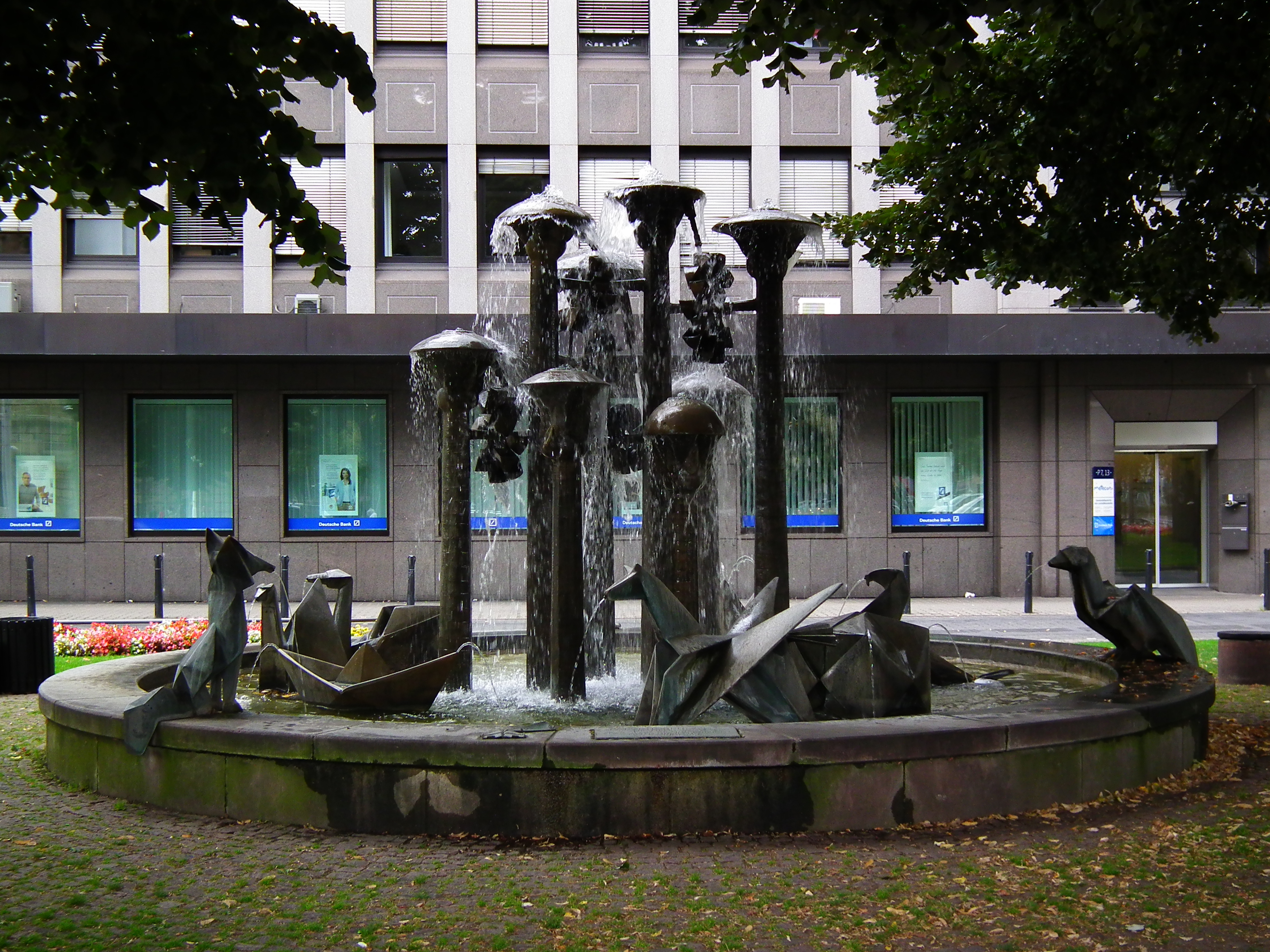
Papyrusbrunnen, Mannheim

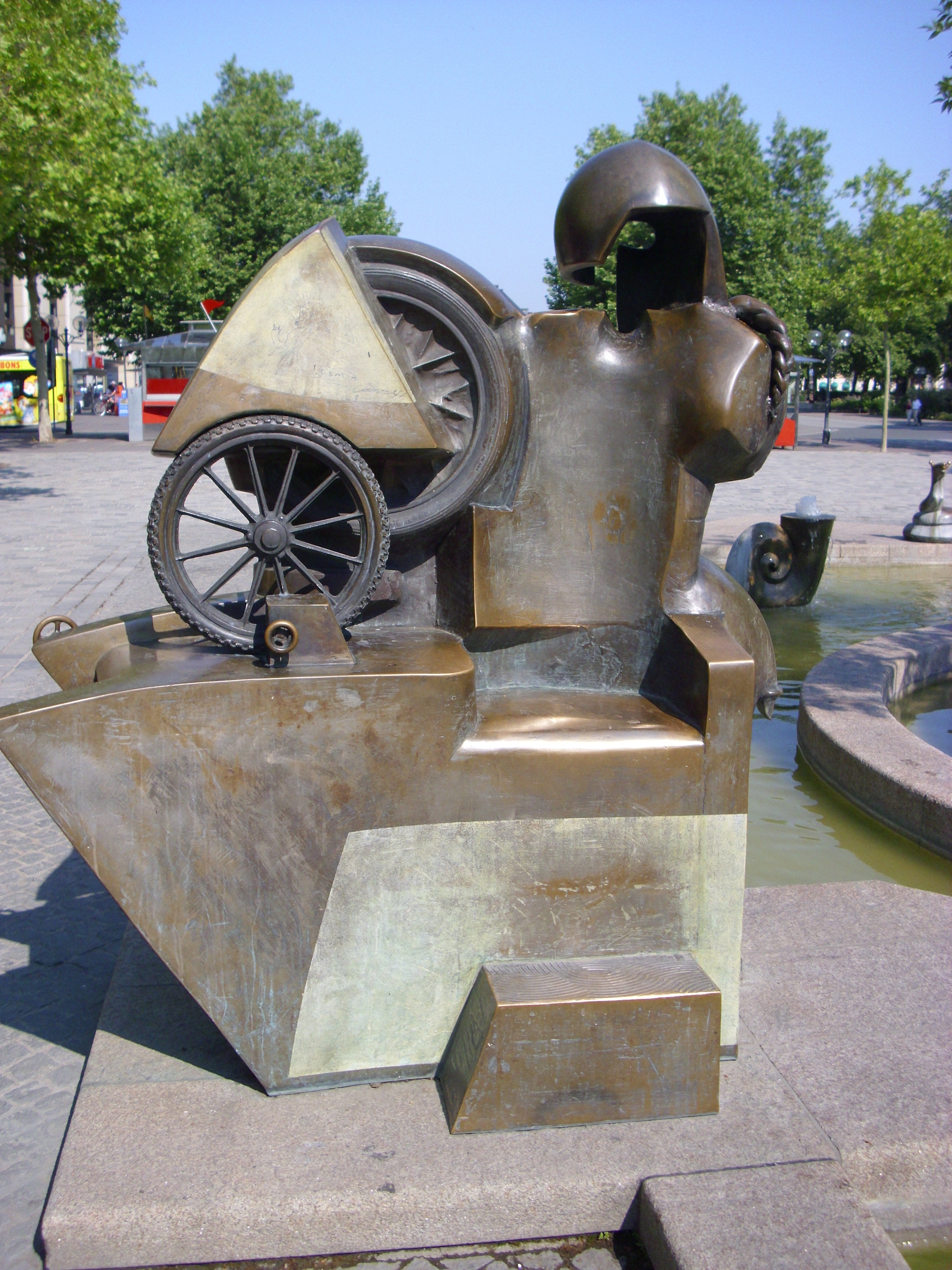
Paradiesbrunnen, Fürth

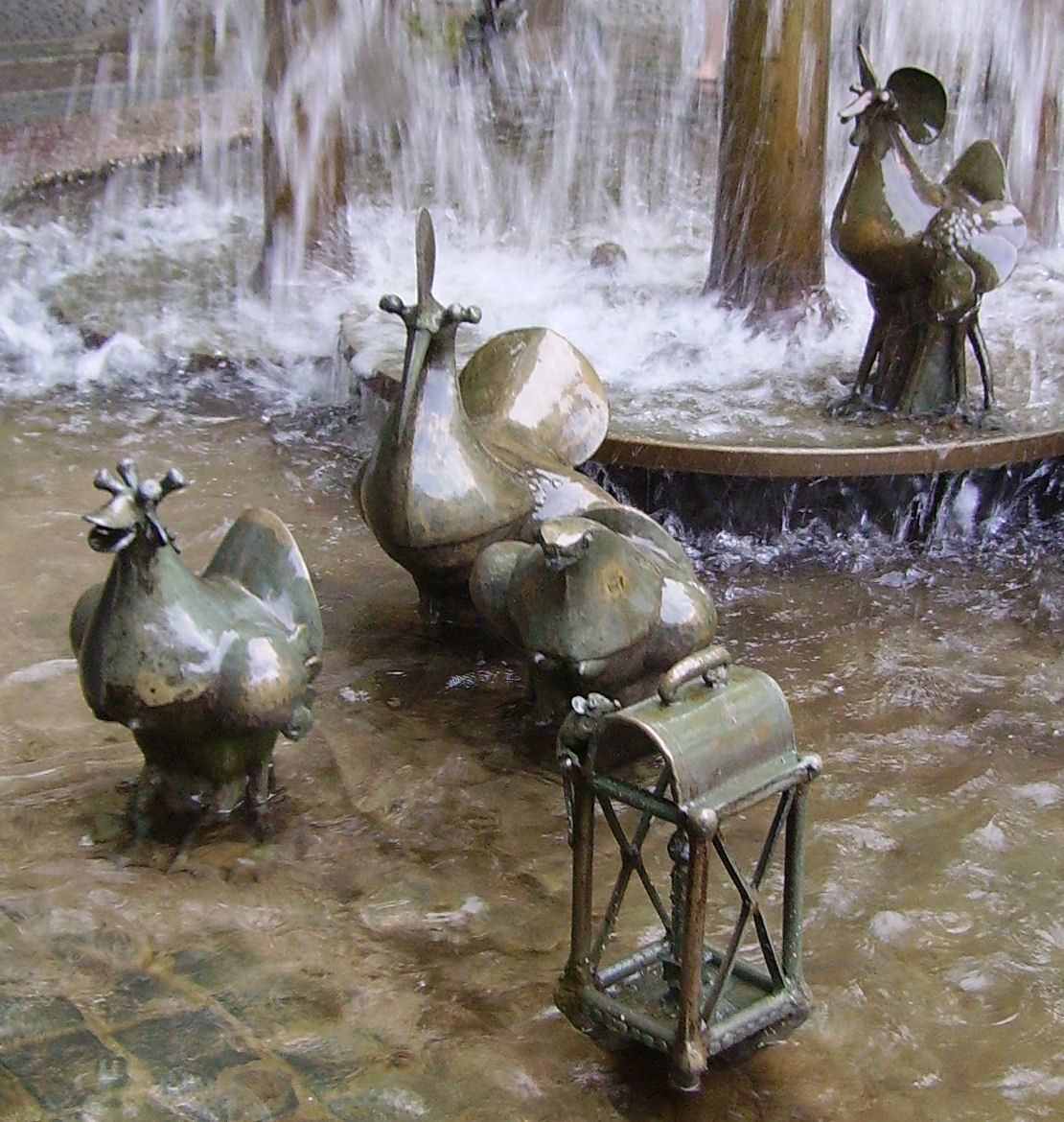
Elwetritschen-Brunnen ♧, Neustadt

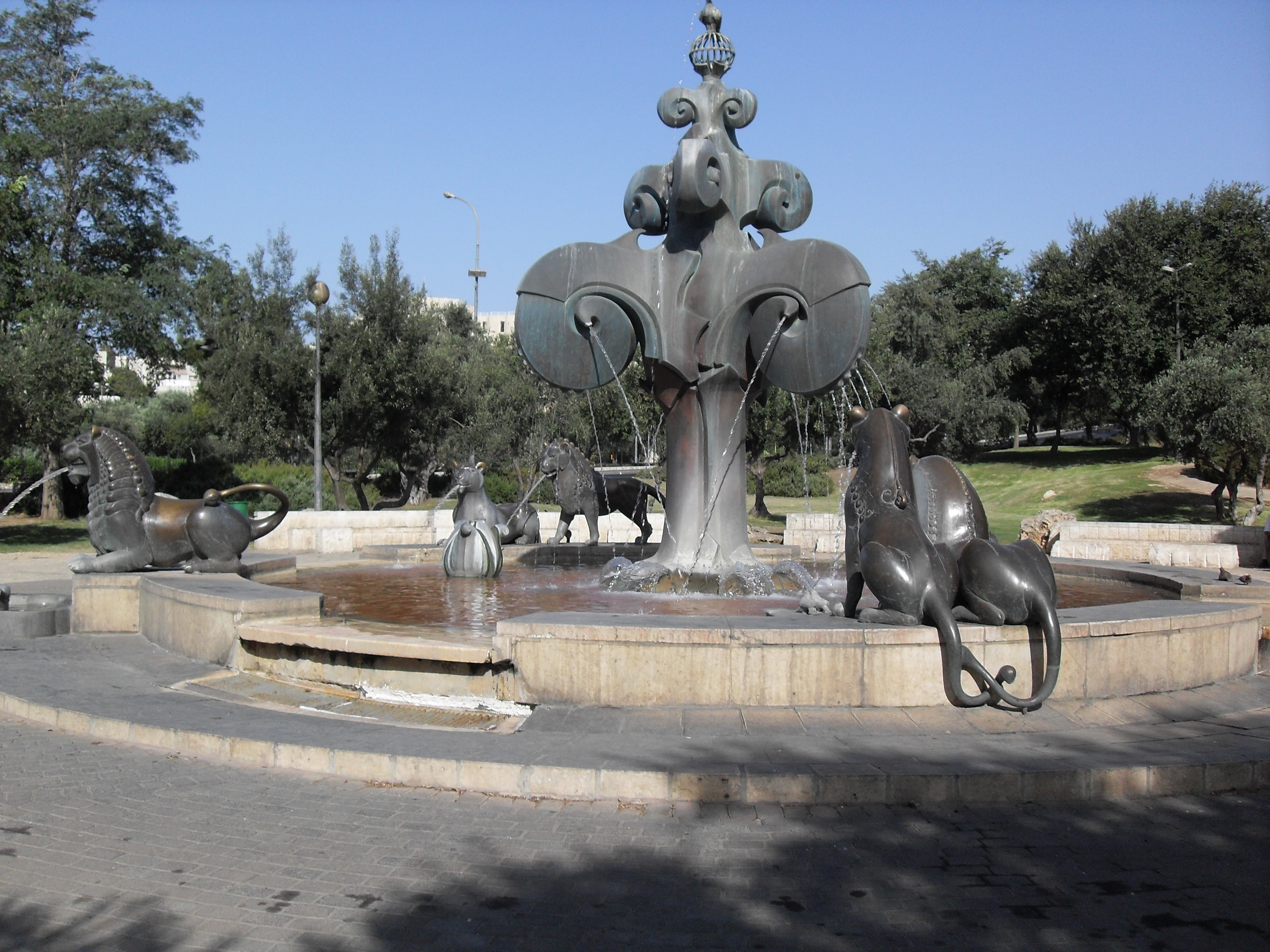
Löwenbrunnen, Jerusalem

== Literature ==
- Hans G. Hausen; Rudolf Joeckle (1981), Die Elwedritsche des Gernot Rumpf (in German), Neustadt an der Weinstraße: Pfälzische Verlagsanstalt
- Kunstkreis Viersen, ed. (1981), Gernot Rumpf und der Remigiusbrunnen in Viersen (in German), Viersen: Verlag Eckers, ISBN 3-923072-00-7
- Hans G. Hausen; Gerd Schattner (1990), Der Kaiser-Brunnen von Gernot Rumpf (in German), Konstanz: Verlag Hartung-Gorre, ISBN 3-89191-338-9
- Egon Ehmer; Karin Patock (1994), Herxheim. Geschichte und Leben rund um den Dorfbrunnen von Gernot und Barbara Rumpf (in German), Verlag Studio h, ISBN 3-931059-00-6
- Verein Südliche Weinstraße, ed. (1996), L'Atelier Mourlot. Gernot Rumpf – die Löwen von Jerusalem (in German), Landau: Ausstellungskatalog der 9. Weintage der Südlichen Weinstraße (Frank-Loebsches-Haus Landau in der Pfalz, 7. bis 10. Juni 1996)
- Hans G. Hausen (2000), Der Löwenbrunnen zu Jerusalem von Gernot und Barbara Rumpf (in German), Konstanz: Verlag Hartung-Gorre, ISBN 3-89649-518-6
- Wolfgang Schütz: Koblenzer Köpfe, Lebensbeschreibungen über Personen der Stadtgeschichte und Namensgeber für Straßen und Plätze, Mülheim-Kärlich (Verlag für Anzeigenblätter) o.J., ohne ISBN, Seite 310, Artikel "Rumpf, Professor Gernot", dort eine Kurzbiographie von Gernot Rumpf sowie eine Besprechung des von Gernot und Barbara Rumpf kreierten "Erfinderbrunnens" (im Koblenzer Volksmund auch "Arche Noah" genannt"), in der Fischelpassage.
