= Böbingen =

- Municipality
- Coat of arms

- Location of Böbingen within Südliche Weinstraße district
- Interactive map of Böbingen
- Location within Germany Location within Rhineland-Palatinate
- Coordinates: 49°17′05″N 8°14′13″E
- Country: Germany
- State: Rhineland-Palatinate
- District: Südliche Weinstraße
- Municipal assoc.: Edenkoben

Government
  - Mayor (2019–24): Stefan Werner

Area
  - Total: 6.91 km^{2} (2.67 sq mi)
- Elevation: 120 m (390 ft)

Population (2025-12-31)
  - Total: 761
  - Density: 110/km^{2} (285/sq mi)
- Time zone: UTC+01:00 (CET)
  - Summer (DST): UTC+02:00 (CEST)
- Postal codes: 67482
- Dialling codes: 06327
- Vehicle registration: SÜW
- Website: www.boebingen-pfalz.de

Böbingen (German pronunciation: [ˈbøːbɪŋən]) is a municipality in the Südliche Weinstraße district, in Rhineland-Palatinate, Germany.
