= Gommersheim =

- Municipality
- Coat of arms

- Location of Gommersheim within Südliche Weinstraße district
- Interactive map of Gommersheim
- Location within Germany Location within Rhineland-Palatinate
- Coordinates: 49°17′31″N 8°16′12″E
- Country: Germany
- State: Rhineland-Palatinate
- District: Südliche Weinstraße
- Municipal assoc.: Edenkoben

Government
  - Mayor (2019–24): Lothar Anton (SPD)

Area
  - Total: 11.3 km^{2} (4.4 sq mi)
- Elevation: 116 m (381 ft)

Population (2025-12-31)
  - Total: 1,602
  - Density: 142/km^{2} (367/sq mi)
- Time zone: UTC+01:00 (CET)
  - Summer (DST): UTC+02:00 (CEST)
- Postal codes: 67377
- Dialling codes: 06327
- Vehicle registration: SÜW
- Website: www.gommersheim.de

Gommersheim (German pronunciation: [ˈɡɔmɐshaɪm]) is a municipality in Südliche Weinstraße district, in Rhineland-Palatinate, western Germany.
