= Edenkoben =

- Town
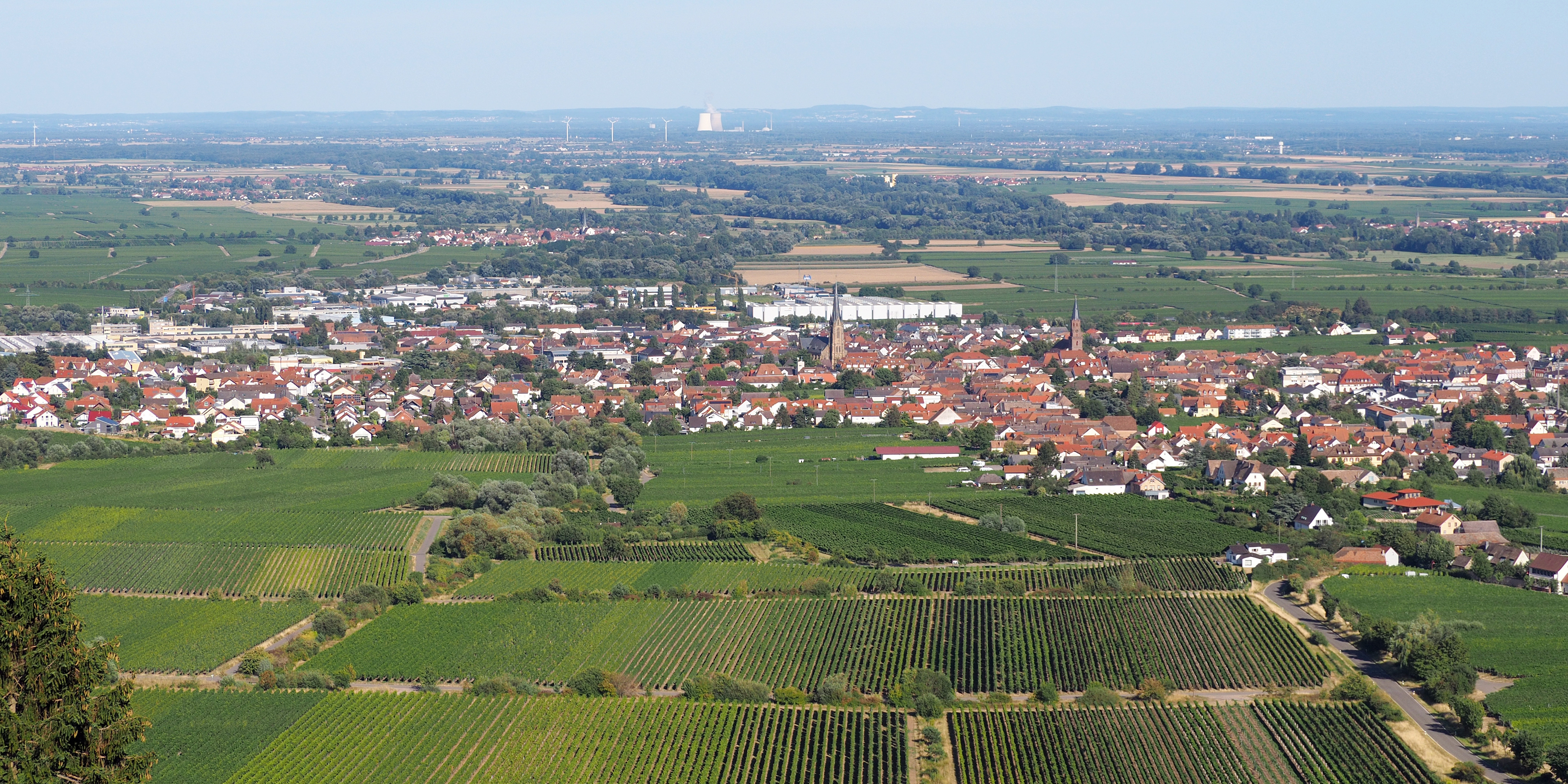

- Coat of arms

- Location of Edenkoben within Südliche Weinstraße district
- Interactive map of Edenkoben
- Location within Germany Location within Rhineland-Palatinate
- Coordinates: 49°17′N 8°8′E
- Country: Germany
- State: Rhineland-Palatinate
- District: Südliche Weinstraße
- Municipal assoc.: Edenkoben

Government
  - Mayor (2019–24): Ludwig Lintz (CDU)

Area
  - Total: 17.89 km^{2} (6.91 sq mi)
- Elevation: 149 m (489 ft)

Population (2025-12-31)
  - Total: 6,904
  - Density: 385.9/km^{2} (999.5/sq mi)
- Time zone: UTC+01:00 (CET)
  - Summer (DST): UTC+02:00 (CEST)
- Postal codes: 67480
- Dialling codes: 06323
- Vehicle registration: SÜW
- Website: www.edenkoben.de

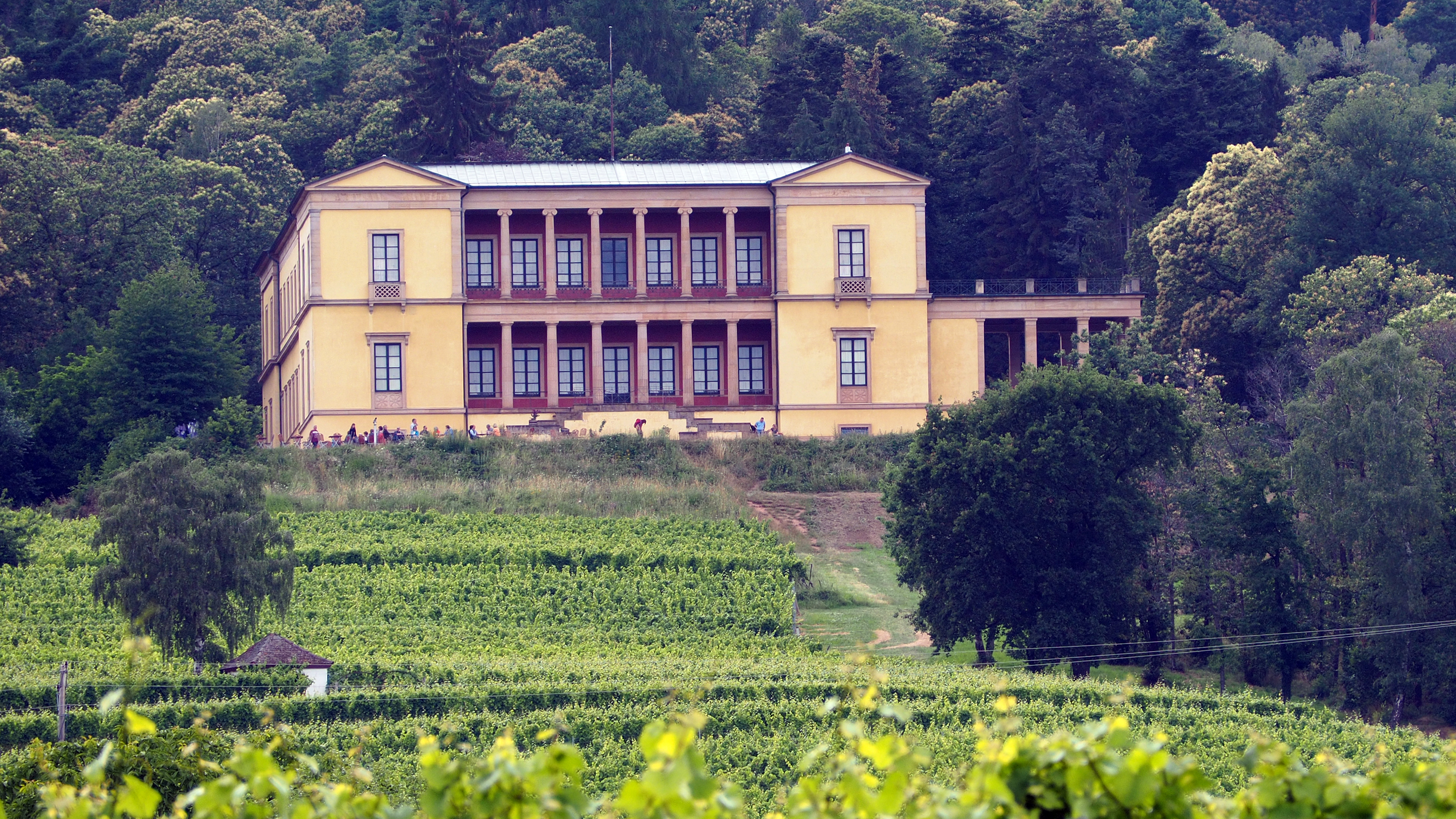
Villa Ludwigshöhe

Edenkoben (German pronunciation: [ˈeːdn̩ˌkoːbn̩]; Palatine German: Edekowe) is a municipality in the Südliche Weinstraße district, in Rhineland-Palatinate, Germany. It lies approximately halfway between Landau and Neustadt an der Weinstraße. Edenkoben is one of the towns situated along the German Wine Route. Edenkoben is the seat of the Verbandsgemeinde ("collective municipality") Edenkoben.

== History ==
This part of the Rhineland passed to Bavaria at 1815 following the Congress of Vienna, which reallocated many of the territories that had comprised Napoleon's empire. Like several towns in the area, Edenkoben has both a Roman Catholic and a Protestant church (recalling King Maximillian's marriage to a Protestant princess).

Edenkoben's status as an administrative and cultural centre for the surrounding villages is reflected in the presence of several high-grade schools. The little town also has a considerable cultivation and trade in wine. Outside the primary (agricultural) sector, industries include the manufacture of automotive exhaust systems and of doors. In former times there was a sulphur-spring here called Kurbrunnen.

Edenkoben is overlooked, on its west side, by the imposing Friedensdenkmal, from the top of which visitors can enjoy a fine view across to the Rhine. Originally constructed to celebrate German unity in the aftermath of the Franco-Prussian War, the memorial was renamed Friedensdenkmal (Peace Memorial) after 1945, when celebration of German military victories fell out of fashion in Europe: at the time of writing the Friedensdenkmal contains a small restaurant. The inscription on the Unification / Peace memorial reflects the determination of the German government in 1871 to downplay the extent to which the Treaty of Frankfurt resulted from military victory by Prussia. Given the frequency with which the German-speaking Rhenish provinces had been devastated by French armies in the seventeenth and eighteenth centuries, it was in this region easy to emphasize the defensive nature of German unification.

== Notable residents ==
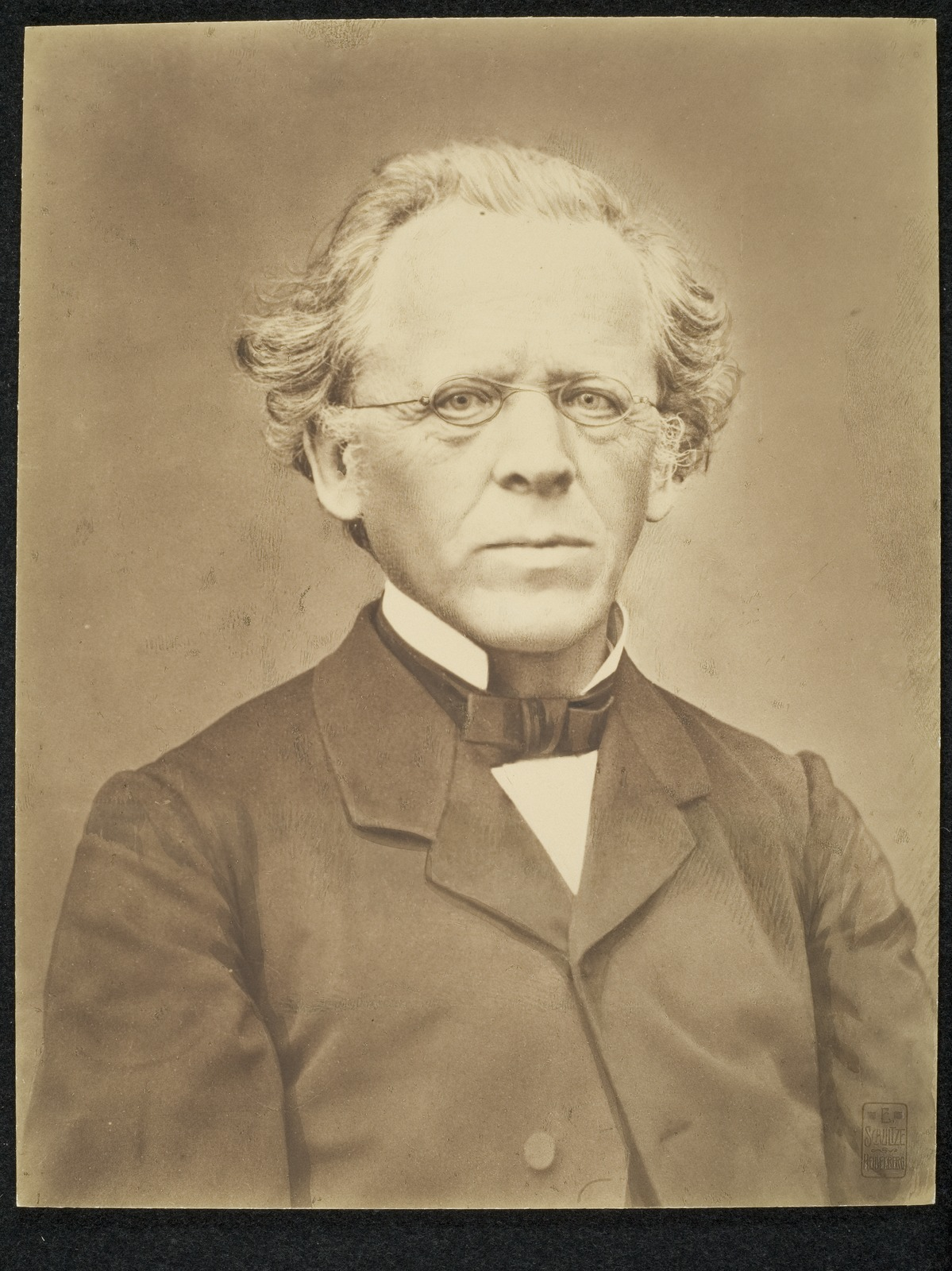
Friedrich Arnold (anatomist)

- Johann Adam Hartmann (1743–1836), frontierman, emigrated to the Americas at the age of 16
- Friedrich Arnold (1803–1890), professor of medicine
- Eugen von Lommel (1837–1899), physicist
- Heinrich Göring (1839–1913), jurist and diplomat
- Theodor Meyer (1853–1936), judge
- Friedrich Auerbach (1870–1925), 1894 to 1898 operation manager at Edenkoben Blaukali factory
- Franz Weidenreich (1873–1949), professor of medicine and anthropologist
- Richard Schneider-Edenkoben (1899–1986), writer, director and screenwriter
- Ralf Fücks (born 1951), politician (The Greens)
