= List of newspapers in New York (state) =

This is a list of newspapers in New York, a state in the North American country of the United States.

== Daily newspapers ==
- Adirondack Daily Enterprise – Saranac Lake
- AM New York – New York City
- The Buffalo News – Buffalo
- The Citizen – Auburn
- Columbia Daily Spectator – New York City
- The Cornell Daily Sun – Ithaca
- Cortland Standard – Cortland
- Daily Freeman – Kingston
- The Daily Gazette – Schenectady
- Daily Messenger – Canandaigua
- The Daily News – Batavia
- The Daily Orange – Syracuse
- The Daily Star – Oneonta
- Democrat and Chronicle – Rochester
- The Epoch Times – New York City
- The Evening Tribune – Hornell
- Finger Lakes Times – Geneva
- The Ithaca Journal – Ithaca
- The Journal News – White Plains
- The Leader – Corning
- The Leader-Herald – Gloversville
- Lockport Union-Sun & Journal – Lockport
- New York Daily News – New York City
- New York Law Journal – New York State
- New York Post – New York City
- The New York Times – New York City
- Newsday – Melville
- Niagara Gazette – Niagara Falls
- Observer – Dunkirk
- Observer-Dispatch – Utica
- Olean Times Herald – Olean
- Open Air PM – New York City
- The Palladium Times – Oswego
- The Post-Journal – Jamestown
- The Post-Standard – Syracuse
- The Post-Star – Glens Falls
- Poughkeepsie Journal – Poughkeepsie
- Press & Sun Bulletin – Binghamton
- Press-Republican – Plattsburgh
- The Record – Troy
- The Register Star – Hudson
- Rome Daily Sentinel – Rome
- Salamanca Press – Salamanca
- The Saratogian – Saratoga Springs
- Star-Gazette – Elmira
- Staten Island Advance – Staten Island
- Times Herald-Record – Middletown
- The Times Telegram – Herkimer
- Times Union – Albany
- USA Today – New York City
- The Wall Street Journal – New York City
- Watertown Daily Times – Watertown
- Wellsville Daily Reporter – Wellsville

== Weekly and other newspapers ==
- Akhon Samoy – New York City
- Alden Advertiser – Alden
- Al-Hoda – New York City
- Algemeiner Journal – New York City
- The Altamont Enterprise – Altamont
- Amherst Bee – Williamsville
- Am-Pol Eagle – Buffalo
- Amerikai Magyar Szo – New York City
- Arcade Herald – Arcade
- Armenian Reporter International – New York City
- Der Blatt – Brooklyn
- Bronx Times-Reporter – Bronx
- Brooklyn Eagle – Brooklyn
- The Brooklyn Rail – Brooklyn
- The Campus Times – Rochester
- The Chief-Leader – New York City
- The Chronicle (Goshen and Chester) (Tuesdays & Fridays: twice-weekly)
- CityArts – New York City
- Dan's Papers – Eastern Long Island
- El Correo NY – New York City
- El Diario La Prensa – New York City
- Farmingdale Observer – Nassau County
- Filipino Reporter – New York City
- Garden City Life – Nassau County
- Glen Cove Record Pilot – Nassau County
- Great Neck Record – Nassau County
- Haïti Progrès – Brooklyn
- Hamburg Sun – Hamburg
- Hamodia – Brooklyn
- Hofstra Chronicle – Hempstead
- Irish Voice – New York City
- The Jewish Daily Forward – New York City
- The Jewish Voice – New York City
- Jewish Post of New York – New York City
- Jewish Press – Brooklyn
- The Jewish Star
- Journal of Commerce – New York City
- Legislative Gazette – Albany
- Levittown Tribune – Nassau County
- Lake Placid News – Lake Placid
- Long Island Business News – Long Island
- Long Island Exchange – Long Island
- Long Island Press – Long Island
- Long Islander News – Huntington
- Manhasset Press – Nassau County
- Massapequa Observer – Nassau County
- Mendon-Honeoye Falls-Lima Sentinel – Monroe County
- The Millerton News – Millerton
- Mineola American – Nassau County
- Nassau Herald – Cedarhurst, Lawrence, Inwood, Hewlett, Woodmere
- National Herald (ETHNIKOS KERYX) – New York City
- Noticia – Nassau & Suffolk Counties
- New Hyde Park Illustrated News – Nassau County
- New York Amsterdam News – New York City
- The New York Observer – New York City
- New York Press – New York City
- New York Sun – New York City
- New Yorker Staats-Zeitung – New York City
- Niagara County Tribune/Sentinel – Niagara County, New York
- North County News – Yorktown
- The North Shore Leader – Locust Valley, North Shore, Long Island
- Norwood News – Bronx
- Nowy Dziennik – New York City
- Outreach – New York City
- Oyster Bay Enterprise-Pilot – Nassau County
- Oyster Bay Guardian
- People's Weekly World – New York City
- Plainview-Old Bethpage Herald – Nassau County
- The Port Times Record – Port Jefferson, Belle Terre, Port Jefferson Station and Mount Sinai
- Port Washington News – Nassau County
- Queens Chronicle – Queens
- The Riverdale Press – New York City
- The Roslyn News – Nassau County
- The Southampton Press — Southampton
- The Sag Harbor Express — Sag Harbor
- Scarsdale Inquirer — Scarsdale
- Super Express USA – New York City
- Syosset-Jericho Tribune – Nassau County
- Tiesa – Middletown
- Times Journal of Cobleskill – Cobleskill
- Vaba Eesti Sona – New York City
- Village Voice – New York City
- The Villager – New York City
- Wantagh Herald Citizen
- Warwick Advertiser – Warwick
- Warwick Valley Dispatch – Warwick
- Washington Square News – New York City
- Watkins Glen Review & Express – Watkins Glen
- The Westbury Times – Nassau County
- Westfield Republican – Westfield
- Yated Ne'eman – Monsey
- Der Yid – Brooklyn
- The Oswegonian – Oswego

== Defunct ==
- American Citizen (1880–)
- Brooklyn Citizen (1887–1947)
- Brooklyn Eagle (1841–1955)
- Buffalo Beast (2002–2013)
- The Buffalo Commercial (1890–1924)
- Buffalo Courier-Express (1926–1982)
- Buffalo Enquirer (1891–1926)
- Catskill Mountain News (1863–2020)
- Commercial Advertiser (1797– 1800)
- Daily Graphic (1873–1889)
- Frederick Douglass's Paper
- Freie Arbeiter Stimme
- Il Progresso Italo-Americano (1880–1988)
- The Journal-Register, Medina (1821–2014)
- Knickerbocker News (1843–1988)
- Long Island Press (Jamaica, New York) (1921–1977)
- The Merchant's Ledger (?–1851)
- Metro (2004–2020)
- National Guardian/The Guardian (1948–1992)
- The National Sports Daily
- Negro World
- New York Age
- New York Courier and Enquirer (1834, New York City)
- New York Evening Journal (1896–1937)
- New-York Gazette (1725–1744)
- New York Herald (1835–1924)
- New York Herald Tribune (1924–1966)
- New York Journal American (1937–1966)
- New York Ledger (1851–1903)
- New York Daily Mirror (1924–1963)
- New York Morning Telegraph (merged with Daily Racing Form)
- New York Daily News (1855–1906)
- The New York Sun (2002–2008)
- New York Sunday News (1866–19??)
- New-York Tribune, 1841–1929
- New York Weekly Journal (1733–1751)
- New York World (1883–1931)
- New York World Journal Tribune (1966–1967)
- New York World-Telegram (1931–1966)
- The North Star, Rochester (1847–1851)
- Onondaga Gazette (1823–1829)
- Open Air PM (1990s)
- Syracuse Herald-Journal (1925–2001)
- Syracuse New Times (1969–2019)
- Syracuse Telegram and Courier (1856–1905)
- Syracuse Telegram (1922–1925)
- Tonawanda News (1880–2015)

== See also ==
- New York City media
- List of radio stations in New York
- List of television stations in New York

Adjoining states

- List of newspapers in Connecticut
- List of newspapers in Massachusetts
- List of newspapers in New Jersey
- List of newspapers in Pennsylvania
- List of newspapers in Vermont

Comprehensive

- Lists of newspapers
- List of newspapers in the United States

Frequency

- List of free daily newspapers in the United States
- List of weekly newspapers in the United States

Circulation

- List of international newspapers originating in the United States
- List of national newspapers in the United States
- List of newspapers in the United States by circulation
- List of newspapers serving cities over 100,000 in the United States

Foreign language

- List of French-language newspapers published in the United States
- List of German-language newspapers published in the United States
- List of Spanish-language newspapers published in the United States

Specialty

- List of African-American newspapers in the United States
- List of alternative weekly newspapers in the United States
- List of business newspapers in the United States
- List of family-owned newspapers in the United States
- List of Jewish newspapers in the United States
- List of LGBTQ periodicals in the United States
- List of student newspapers in the United States
- List of supermarket tabloids in the United States
- List of underground press in the United States

Other

- List of defunct newspapers of the United States
