= Daily Messenger =

American newspaper

- Type: Daily newspaper
- Format: Broadsheet
- Owner: USA Today Co.
- Publisher: Rick Emanuel
- Editor: Jennifer Reed
- Founded: The Ontario Gazette and Western Chronicle, originally published in Geneva, New York, in 1796
- Headquarters: 73 Buffalo Street, Canandaigua, New York 14424, United States
- Circulation: 5,779 (as of 2018)
- OCLC number: 10768064
- Website: MPNnow.com

The Daily Messenger is an American daily newspaper published weekday afternoons and on Sundays (as the Sunday Messenger) in Canandaigua, New York. It is owned by USA Today Co.

In addition to the city of Canandaigua, the Daily Messenger covers all of Ontario County, and its associated weekly newspapers cover Monroe and Wayne counties. Together, the Messenger Post Newspapers cover the eastern portion of the Rochester metropolitan area.

== History ==
The paper was founded in Canandaigua as the weekly Genesee Messenger in 1806, adopting the name Ontario Messenger in 1810. A merger with The Ontario Repository in 1862 yielded a combined weekly called The Ontario Repository and Messenger. When the paper converted to daily publication in 1906, it took the name The Ontario Messenger and Repository. In the 1910s this was shortened to The Daily Messenger.

Although the Messenger name began in 1806, its history through The Repository was much longer. That paper incorporated the Ontario Freeman (1803), the Western Repository and Genesee Advertiser (1803) and The Ontario Gazette and Western Chronicle, originally published in Geneva, New York, in 1796. In the 1910s the Daily Messenger billed itself as the "oldest newspaper west of Hudson River".

== Sister newspapers ==
Newspapers in the Messenger Post Newspapers chain share their Canandaigua headquarters building, the MPNnow.com website, their publisher and executive editor, and their business office functions. Messenger Post papers include:

- The Post, serving Chili, Gates, Greece of Monroe County
- The Post, serving Irondequoit, Penfield, Webster of Monroe County
- The Post, serving Brighton, East Rochester, Fairport, Henrietta, Pittsford of Monroe County
- The Post, serving Farmington, Victor of Ontario County
- Wayne Post of Wayne County

Apart from Messenger Post, the parent company GateHouse Media also owns two other nearby weeklies in the Genesee Valley, The Chronicle-Express of Penn Yan and the Genesee Country Express of Dansville, and several properties in the Southern Tier, including the Steuben Courier of Bath and three dailies, The Leader of Corning, The Evening Tribune of Hornell and the Wellsville Daily Reporter in Wellsville.

GateHouse, which owns hundreds of daily and weekly newspapers from California to Massachusetts, has its corporate offices in Fairport, which is in the Messenger Post coverage area.
