= Kenny Albert =

American sportscaster (born 1968)

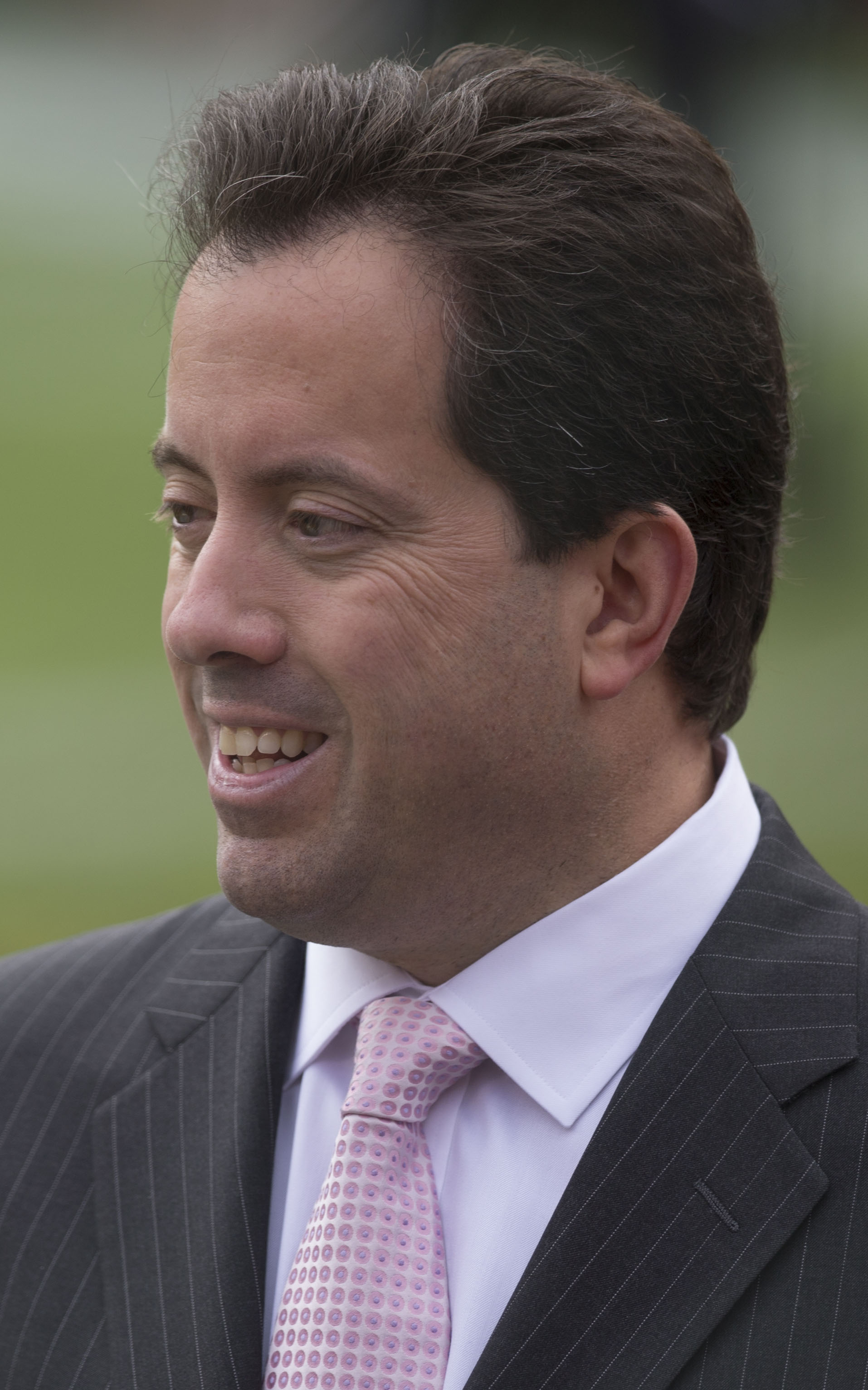
- Albert in 2015
- Born: Kenneth Gary Albert; February 2, 1968 (age 58); New York City, U.S.
- Years active: 1990–present
- Spouse: Barbara Wolf (m. 1996)
- Children: 2
- Parent(s): Marv Albert; Benita Oberlander
- Relatives: Al Albert (uncle); Steve Albert (uncle)
- Sports commentary career
- Genre: Play-by-play
- Sports: NFL, NBA, MLB, NHL

Kenneth Gary Albert (born February 2, 1968) is an American sportscaster, the son of NBA sportscaster Marv Albert and nephew of sportscasters Al Albert and Steve Albert. He is the only sportscaster who currently does play-by-play for all four major professional sports leagues in the United States and Canada (NFL, NBA, MLB, NHL).

== Early life ==
Albert's parents gave him a tape recorder for his fifth birthday to practice his broadcasting. On his sixth birthday in 1974, his father took him along to a New York Rangers game. One of the statisticians had to leave in the middle of the game, so Albert got to do the stats for the rest of the game. At 14, he became the official statistician for the Rangers on the radio. At 16, he wrote content for the Rangers program. Aside from his father, his idol was Vancouver Canucks play-by-play broadcaster Jim Robson. From 1981 to 1986, Albert, growing up in Sands Point, covered high school sports for the Port Washington News at Paul D. Schreiber High School, an Anton Community Newspapers publication.

Albert graduated from New York University in 1990 with a degree in broadcasting and journalism. He was a member of the Sigma Phi Epsilon fraternity. Albert worked in the sports department at WNYU radio. While working there he was able to pick up his quick responses while announcing local games.

== Broadcasting career ==
Albert is the full time TV play-by-play announcer of the New York Rangers on MSG Network as of the 2025–26 NHL season, after serving as the primary radio voice of the team since 1995. He is also a play-by-play announcer and field-level reporter for Fox's coverage of Major League Baseball, the National Football League, and previously, the Sugar Bowl.

Previously, Albert was the radio broadcaster for the American Hockey League's Baltimore Skipjacks from 1990 to 1992. He later handled TV play-by-play for the Washington Capitals and Washington Bullets (now the Washington Wizards), and was a part-time announcer on Washington Nationals telecasts in 2005. Additionally, he does TV play-by-play for the Washington Commanders (formerly the Washington Redskins) preseason games with Joe Theismann. Albert called the international broadcast of Super Bowl XLVI with Theismann.

When Fox had the network contract for the National Hockey League in the 1990s, Albert also worked on Fox NHL Saturday telecasts. Albert previously did play-by-play for the NHL on NBC and formerly with Versus (later called NBCSN). Albert called game one of the 2014 Stanley Cup Final for NBC, filling in for Mike Emrick, who was dealing with a death in the family. He has done work for NBC's Olympics coverage, as a play-by-play announcer for men's and women's ice hockey at every Winter Olympic Games since Salt Lake City in 2002.

Albert has also done college basketball for ESPN Plus and is a substitute play-by-play announcer for televised New York Knicks games on MSG Network. For the 2011 playoffs, Albert broadcast for two playoff teams in the same market, doing the play-by-play for the New York Rangers on WEPN 1050 ESPN radio and filling in on MSG Network doing play-by-play for the New York Knicks.

Albert was the play-by-play announcer for the 2015 American League Division Series between the Texas Rangers and the Toronto Blue Jays. In the top of the 7th inning of Game 5, he helped explain the rule regarding the errant throw by Toronto Blue Jays catcher Russell Martin, which resulted in Texas scoring the go-ahead run. In the bottom of the inning, he called Jose Bautista's go-ahead home run.

In 2016, Albert was nominated for the Sports Emmy Award for Outstanding Sports Personality, Play-by-Play in a list that included fellow Fox and NBC colleagues Kevin Burkhardt, eventual winner Mike Emrick, and even his own father.

After Emrick's retirement, Albert became NBC's lead play-by-play announcer for the 2020–21 NHL season, paired with Emrick's long-time partner Eddie Olczyk, having previously filled in for Emrick in game one of the 2014 Stanley Cup Final due to a death in the latter's family. With NBC losing its NHL rights starting in the 2021–22 season, the pair moved to Turner Sports to serve in the same capacity.

Albert is a frequent guest on WNYU-FM's sports talk program, The Cheap Seats. He has also made many appearances on the popular New York sports internet radio show Sports Heaven with Mark and Evan.

Albert has been an announcer with the NFL on Fox since Fox acquired the rights to the NFL in 1994. On October 13, 2024, Albert became the first play-by-play broadcaster to call 500 regular season or postseason games for the same network; CBS's Jim Nantz would reach the milestone later that year.

=== Four sports in four days ===
On October 25, 2009, Albert called the play-by-play of the Minnesota Vikings – Pittsburgh Steelers NFL game for Fox and then hosted the New York Yankees' locker room celebration after clinching the American League Championship Series that night. The following night he broadcast a Rangers game on radio, and on October 28, he called the play-by-play of the New York Knicks season opener on MSG Network.

== Personal life ==
Albert currently resides in New Jersey with his wife of 30 years, Barbara (Wolf), and their two daughters, Amanda and Sydney. Albert was introduced to his wife by close friend and Baltimore sports reporter, Jerry Coleman.

Albert has frequently cited his love of all sports but mainly hockey and basketball. He has cited baseball as the hardest sport to commentate.

Kenny Albert released his first book, an autobiography entitled "A Mic For All Seasons" on October 10, 2023 with Triumph Publishing. The book documents his 30 years of broadcasting, citing stories about his career rise, relationships with broadcasters and athletes and his family.

== Career timeline ==
Year	Title	Role	Network
1990–1992	Baltimore Skipjacks	Play-by-play	MSG Network
1992–1995	Washington Capitals	Play-by-play	Home Team Sports
1993–1994	NHL on ESPN2	Play-by-play	ESPN2
1995–present	New York Rangers	Play-by-play	MSG Network
1994–present	NFL on Fox	play-by-play	Fox
1995–1999	NHL on Fox	Play-by-play	Fox
1999–2000	NTRA on Fox	Host	Fox
2001–2019, 2022–present	MLB on Fox	Play-by-play	Fox
2005	Washington Nationals	Fill-in television play-by-play	MASN
2005–2006	NHL on Versus	Play-by-play	Versus
2007–2009	Sugar Bowl	Play-by-play	Fox
2009–present	New York Knicks	Fill-in television play-by-play	MSG Network
2010–2023	Washington Redskins/Commanders Broadcast Network	Preseason play-by-play	NBC Sports Washington
2011	NHL on Versus	Playoffs play-by-play	Versus
2012–2021	NHL on NBC	Secondary play-by-play and then lead play-by-play	NBC
2021–present	NHL on TNT	Play-by-play (lead)	TNT/TBS/TruTV

=== Olympics ===
- 2002: Winter Olympics – hockey play-by-play
- 2006: Winter Olympics – hockey play-by-play
- 2010: Winter Olympics – hockey play-by-play
- 2014: Winter Olympics – hockey play-by-play
- 2016: Summer Olympics – track and field play-by-play
- 2018: Winter Olympics – hockey play-by-play
- 2021: Summer Olympics - baseball and volleyball play-by-play
- 2022: Winter Olympics - hockey play-by-play
- 2024: 2024 Summer Olympics - Water polo play-by-play
- 2026: Winter Olympics - hockey play-by-play

=== Radio ===
- 1994–1995, 2016–2020: NHL Radio – lead play-by-play
- 1995–2025: New York Rangers – radio play-by-play

== Books ==
- Albert, Kenny (October 10, 2023). A Mic for All Seasons. Triumph Books. ISBN 9781637272176.

Preceded by Mike Emrick	Stanley Cup Final American network television play-by-play announcer 2014 (with Mike Emrick; Albert called Game 1); 2021-present (alternating with ABC's Sean McDonough in odd numbered years beginning in 2022)	Succeeded by Mike Emrick; Incumbent
