= Keeper's House at Williamsbridge Reservoir =

Historic house in the Bronx, New York

- U.S. National Register of Historic Places
- New York City Landmark
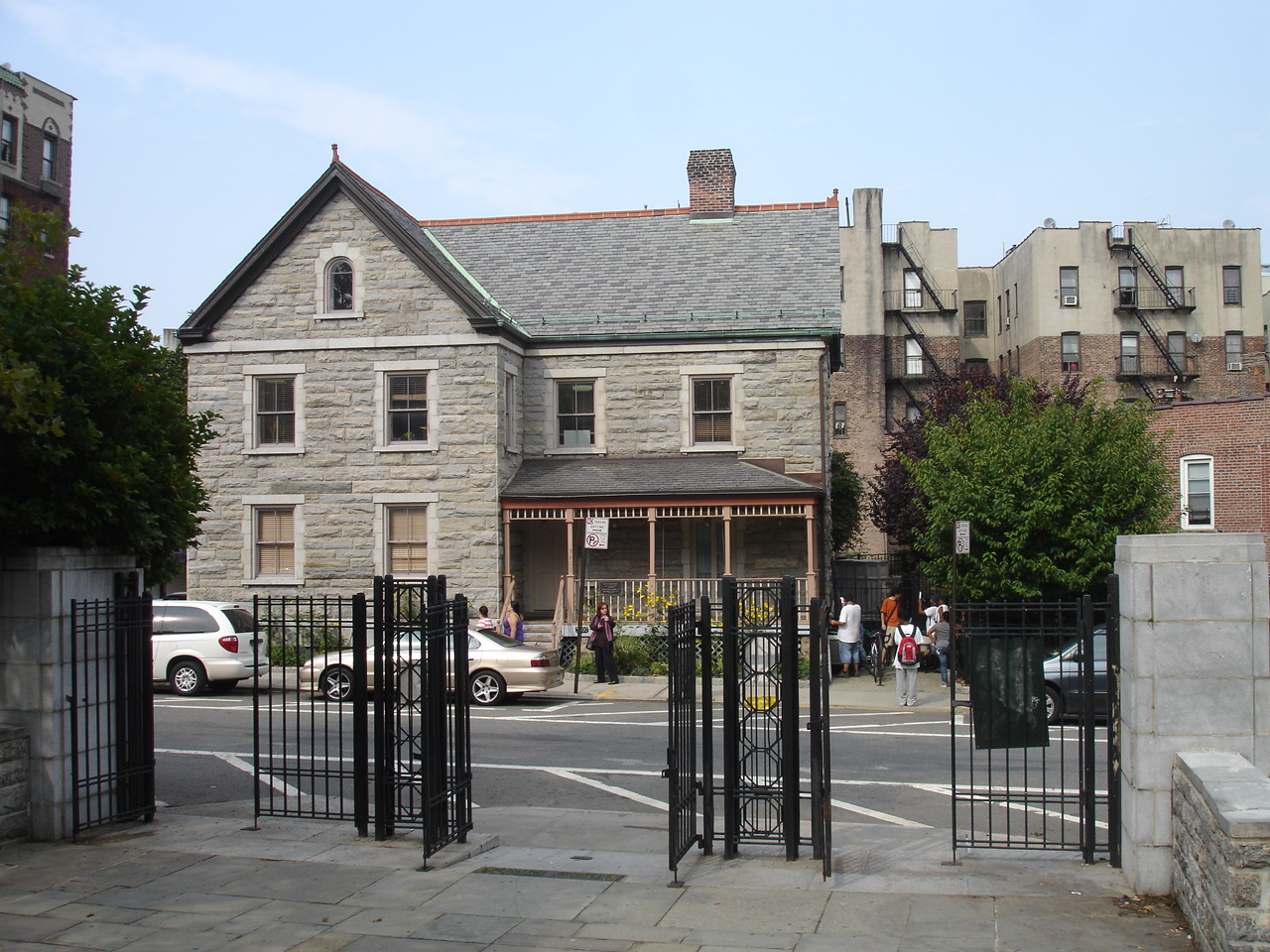
- The Keeper's House at the Williamsbridge Reservoir in Summer, 2010

- Location within New York City Location within New York Location within the United States
- Location: 3400 Reservoir Oval East, Bronx, New York
- Coordinates: 40°52′43″N 73°52′34″W
- Area: less than one acre
- Built: 1889
- Architect: Birdsall, George W.
- NRHP reference No.: 99001131
- NYCL No.: 2047

Significant dates
- Added to NRHP: September 24, 1999
- Designated NYCL: February 8, 2000

The Keeper's House at Williamsbridge Reservoir is a historic home located in the borough of the Bronx in New York City. It was built in 1889 as part of the Williamsbridge Reservoir complex. It is a 2 1/2-story, L-shaped stone house. The stones used to build the house were pieces of granite taken from the excavation of the reservoir it was to serve. It is 5,000 square feet (460 m^{2}) in size and has a slate-covered gable roof with a clay tile roof ridge and copper gutters.

It was listed on the National Register of Historic Places in 1999. At that time, it was acquired by the Mosholu Preservation Corporation, a non-profit enterprise founded by the Montefiore Medical Center in 1981, intended as a powerful antidote to widespread housing deterioration and abandonment in its surrounding neighborhood in the Norwood section of the Bronx. The corporation did a major renovation of the building and restored it to the point where it could provide modern conveniences. The house now serves as the corporation's headquarters. It is also the headquarters for the Norwood News.

== See also ==
- List of New York City Designated Landmarks in The Bronx
- National Register of Historic Places in Bronx County, New York
- Norwood News
