= Riverdale Kingsbridge Academy =

Public school in New York City

David A. Stein Riverdale/Kingsbridge Academy

Location
- 660 West 237th Street; Bronx, New York 10463; United States
- 40°53′17″N 73°54′50″W

Information
- School type: Public
- School district: New York City Department of Education
- School number: MS/HS 141
- CEEB code: 330938
- Principal: Lori O'Mara
- Teaching staff: 92 (on an FTE basis)
- Grades: 6–12
- Gender: All
- Enrollment: 1,450 (2016–2017)
- Average class size: 31
- Student to teacher ratio: 16
- Colors: Blue and gold
- Athletics: PSAL
- Mascot: Tigers
- Newspaper: RKA Gazette
- Website: www.rka141.org

The David A. Stein Riverdale/Kingsbridge Academy is a public middle school and high school in the Riverdale neighborhood of the Bronx. It serves roughly 1,500 students. The school opened as Junior High School 141 in 1957 after a years-long crusade by local parents and the Riverdale Press to bring new schools to a neighborhood that was experiencing explosive growth. A similar effort added the high school in 1999.

In 1983, in recognition of the role he and his newspaper had played in advocating for the construction of the school, the city named it in honor of David A. Stein, the founder and publisher of the Riverdale Press, who had died a year earlier.

== Curriculum ==
In addition to a diverse college-preparatory curriculum, Riverdale Kingsbridge Academy offers a middle school Honors Program, Advanced Placement courses, and enrollment courses through Hunter College. Advanced Placement courses include Spanish, U.S. history, art, biology, calculus, and literature. As of 2023 there are middle school STEM and debate honors classes.

== Extracurricular activities ==
Student groups and activities at Riverdale Kingsbridge Academy include band, book clubs, after-school clubs, environmental club, Model United Nations, MOUSE Squad, National Honor Society and National Junior Honor Society, Literary Magazine (Paw Print), Nutrition Club, Middle School Science Olympiad, High School Science Olympiad, Key Club, and Yearbook Club.

Riverdale Kingsbridge Academy athletic teams compete in the PSAL (high school) and CHAMPS (middle school). The high school teams include baseball, basketball, golf, lacrosse, soccer, softball, volleyball, and wrestling. The middle school teams include dance, tennis, and wrestling.

The baseball team won the 2010 Division B Championship, finishing with a perfect 21–0 record. In the 2016–2017 season, the boys cross country team won fourth place as a team at the PSAL Varsity City Championship achieving the State Qualifying standard, the first-ever RKA team in history to compete at the New York State Championship.

== Demographics ==
In the 2022–2023 school year, 1% of students were American Indian/Native American, 8% were Asian American, 9% were Black, 56% were Hispanic/Latino, 25% were white, and 1% were multiracial.

== Notable alumni ==
- Neil deGrasse Tyson - astrophysicist, author, and science communicator
