= Nassau Herald =

Newspaper of Nassau County, New York

- Type: Weekly newspaper
- Owner: Beegle Pub. Co. (1934–?); Richner Communications (since 2013)
- Editor: Jeffrey Bessen
- Founded: 1934; 92 years ago in Lawrence, Nassau County, New York
- Language: English
- Headquarters: Garden City, New York
- City: Garden City, New York
- Country: United States
- Circulation: 5,874 (as of 2017)
- Sister newspapers: Long Island Herald newspaper chain, Wantagh Herald Citizen, The Jewish Star, Oyster Bay Guardian, The Riverdale Press
- ISSN: 2997-8750
- OCLC number: 33312769
- Website: liherald.com

The Nassau Herald is a weekly newspaper serving the Five Towns communities of Nassau County – Lawrence, Cedarhurst, Inwood, Woodsburgh, Woodmere, and Hewlett. It is part of the Long Island Herald newspaper chain, which includes The Jewish Star and the Oyster Bay Guardian, is owned by Richner Communications, and covers Nassau County, New York.

The paper started publishing in 1934 and was based out of Lawrence, Nassau County, New York. After the offices were destroyed by a fire in 2004, the newspaper moved into offices in Garden City, New York with the other Long Island Herald newspapers.

Published every Thursday with a daily online presence, The Herald is sold for $1.00 at newsstands. The Herald newspapers are members of the New York Press Association.
