= The Jewish Star (New York) =

Newspaper published in Garden City, New York

- Type: Weekly newspaper
- Owner: Richner Communications
- Publisher: Ed Weintrob
- Editor: Malka Eisenberg
- Founded: 2002
- Language: English
- Headquarters: Garden City, New York
- City: Garden City, New York
- Country: United States
- Circulation: 11,300 (as of 2017)
- Sister newspapers: Long Island Herald newspaper chain, Nassau Herald, Wantagh Herald Citizen, Oyster Bay Guardian, The Riverdale Press
- Website: www.thejewishstar.com

The Jewish Star is a free weekly newspaper that covers the Orthodox Jewish communities in Nassau County, New York and New York City. Its offices are in Garden City, New York.

== History ==
The Jewish Star began publication in 2002 led by founding Publisher and Editor Jody Bodner Dubow. It is owned by Richner Communications Inc., the parent company of Nassau County’s Herald Community Newspapers, Long Island Xpress chain of shopper publications, and The Riverdale Press in the Bronx.

In 2006, the newspaper became predominantly Orthodox, responding to the demographics of the Five Towns, its primary readership base. In January 2009, the broadsheet format became tabloid.

Ed Weintrob, formerly publisher of The Brooklyn (NY) Paper, became Publisher in May 2013, and later Publisher and Editor; Malka Eisenberg was a former Editor. Former Publishers include Karen C. Green (2011–13), Rabbi David Nasenoff (2011) and Mayer Fertig (2006-2010).
