= Wantagh Herald Citizen =

Wantagh Herald
- Type: Weekly newspaper
- Format: Tabloid, Digital
- Owner: Richner Communications
- Publisher: Clifford and Stuart Richner
- Editor: None
- Founded: 1949 (as Southeaster)
- Language: American English
- Headquarters: 2 Endo Boulevard; Garden City, Nassau County, New York 11530
- City: Garden City
- Country: United States
- Circulation: 2,952 (as of 2018)
- Sister newspapers: Long Island Herald newspaper chain, Nassau Herald, The Jewish Star, Oyster Bay Guardian, The Riverdale Press
- ISSN: 2469-813X
- OCLC number: 883786393
- Website: liherald.com/wantagh

The Wantagh Herald is an American weekly newspaper that serves Garden City, Wantagh, and Seaford in Nassau County, New York. It is published on Thursdays with a circulation of 3,081 as of 2018.

It is considered a paper of public record by Nassau County clerk's office.

== History ==
The Wantagh Herald Citizen was founded as the Southeaster in 1949 and became the Wantagh Seaford Citizen in 1953. The paper was split in two and changed in 2014 to the Wantagh Herald Citizenand Seaford Herald Citizen. In 2021, they both became the Wantagh Herald and Seaford Herald.

G.L. Bricker, an early editor of the Southeaster paper in Wantagh, was sued for a million dollars for libel by the New York Communist Party.

In 1958, Faith and Johannes Laursen purchased the paper, along with Merrick Life, Bellmore Life, and the Freeport-Baldwin Leader. Johannes Laursen was briefly the head of the New York Press Association. The four papers together comprised L&M Publications, which was later run by the Laursen's children, Linda Toscano and Paul Laursen.

L&M Publications was acquired in 2013 by Richner Communications, and the Wantagh Seaford Citizen was added to Richner's newspaper group, Herald Community Newspapers. It was split into two newspapers; the Wantagh Herald Citizen and Seaford Herald Citizen. In 2021, both papers dropped the Citizen from their title, and are now the Wantagh Herald and Seaford Herald.
