= Norwood News =

Newspaper in New York City, New York

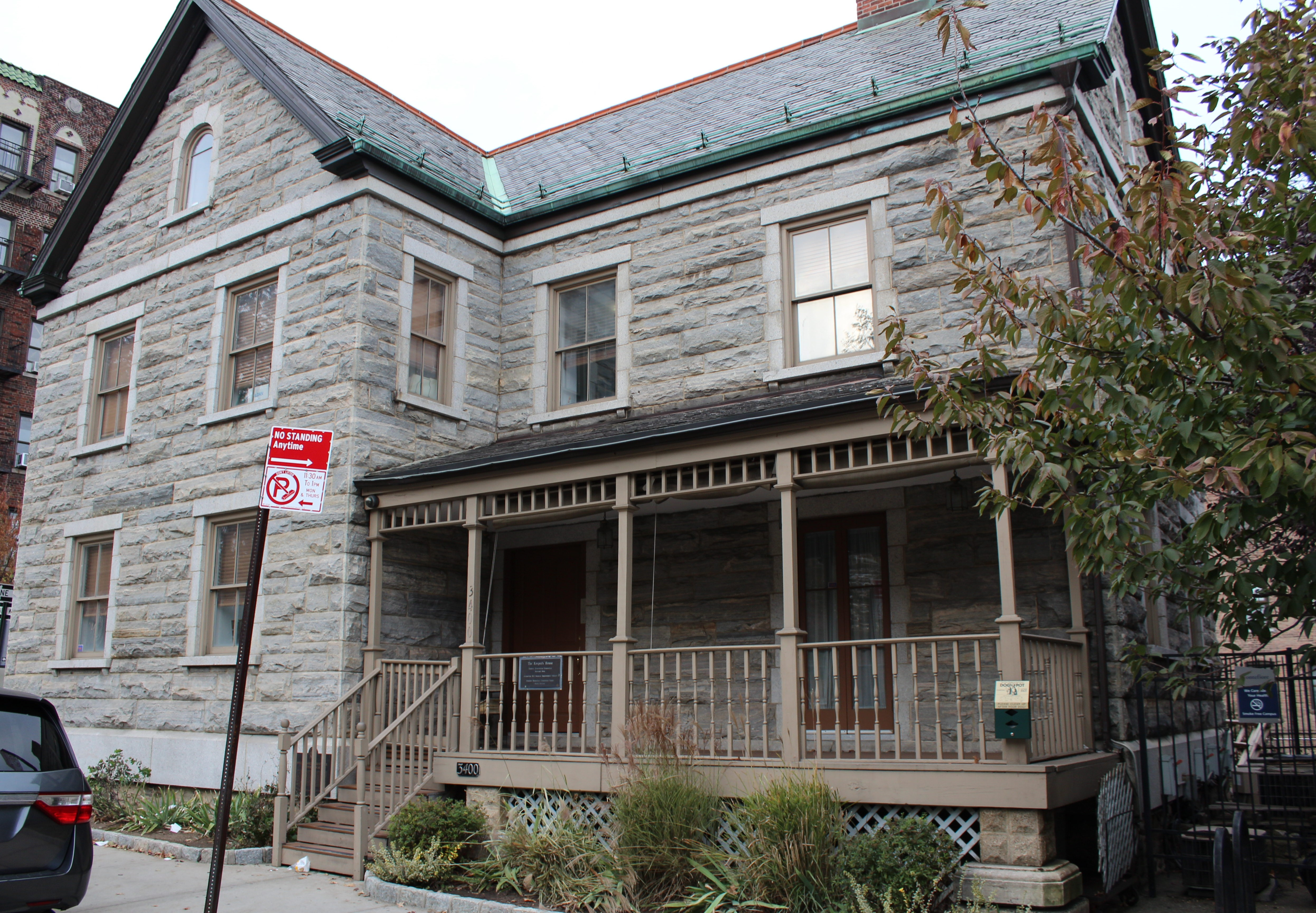
- Norwood News Headquarters at the Keeper's House
- Type: Bi-weekly newspaper
- Format: Tabloid
- Founder: Dart Westphal
- Publisher: Mosholu Preservation Corporation
- Editor: Síle Moloney
- Founded: 1988
- Ceased publication: 2026
- Language: English
- Headquarters: Keeper's House at Williamsbridge Reservoir
- City: Bronx, New York
- Country: United States
- Circulation: 15,000 (as of 2017)
- Website: norwoodnews.org
- Free online archives: Yes

Norwood News was a bi-weekly newspaper that primarily served the Northwest Bronx neighborhoods of Norwood, Bedford Park, Fordham and University Heights. It was founded in October 1988 by the Mosholu Preservation Corporation, a not-for-profit affiliate of Montefiore Medical Center. It won a number of awards for community coverage, including from the New York Press Club. In August 2026, the paper ceased.

== History ==
The paper, which began as a monthly in 1988, was created by Dart Westphal, president of Mosholu Preservation Corporation, with the help of founding editor Betty Chen, after "sensing that [Norwood] needed a communication vehicle, a way for people and organizations to talk to each other and build on their community improvement efforts."

In 1994, the paper published the article "Did Former Buildings Commish Sink P.S. 20?", which established it as a paper that could produce hard-hitting news. This was also the year the paper switched to its current bi-weekly format.

In 1998, the newspaper moved to the Keeper's House at Williamsbridge Reservoir after the Mosholu Preservation Corporation purchased the house from Dr. Issac H. Barkey to establish it as the newspaper's headquarters.

In 2006, the article "Battle Against Pinnacle Group Resembles '78 Riverdale Row" revealed shady tactics used by the Pinnacle Group, a housing corporation, to evict residents who could not afford to pay rent.

In 2013, legislation was passed by Councilman Fernando Cabrera that allowed New Yorkers to view crime maps after the Norwood News spent years investigating the lack of transparency from the New York City Police Department.

In 2015, the paper published the award-winning article "Tenants Turn Heat Up On Landlord", which revealed a spike in heat complaints after multiple buildings were purchased by The Related Companies, a multi-billion dollar development firm.

On Aug. 28, 2026, the paper published its final issue.

== Legacy ==
In 2003, Bronx Borough President Adolfo Carrión Jr. proclaimed October 29 as Norwood News Day in the Bronx.

== List of editors-in-chief ==
- Betty Chen (October 1988 – January 1993)
- Helen Schaub (February 1993 – September 1994)
- Jordan Moss (October 1994 – August 2011)
- Alex Kratz (September 2011 – November 2013)
- David Cruz (December 2013 – March 2020)
- Síle Moloney (March 2020 – September 2026)

== See also ==
- Local news
- Bronx Times-Reporter
- Mott Haven Herald
- Riverdale Press
- News 12 The Bronx / News 12 Brooklyn
- Keeper's House at Williamsbridge Reservoir
