= Patrick McMullan =

American photographer and writer

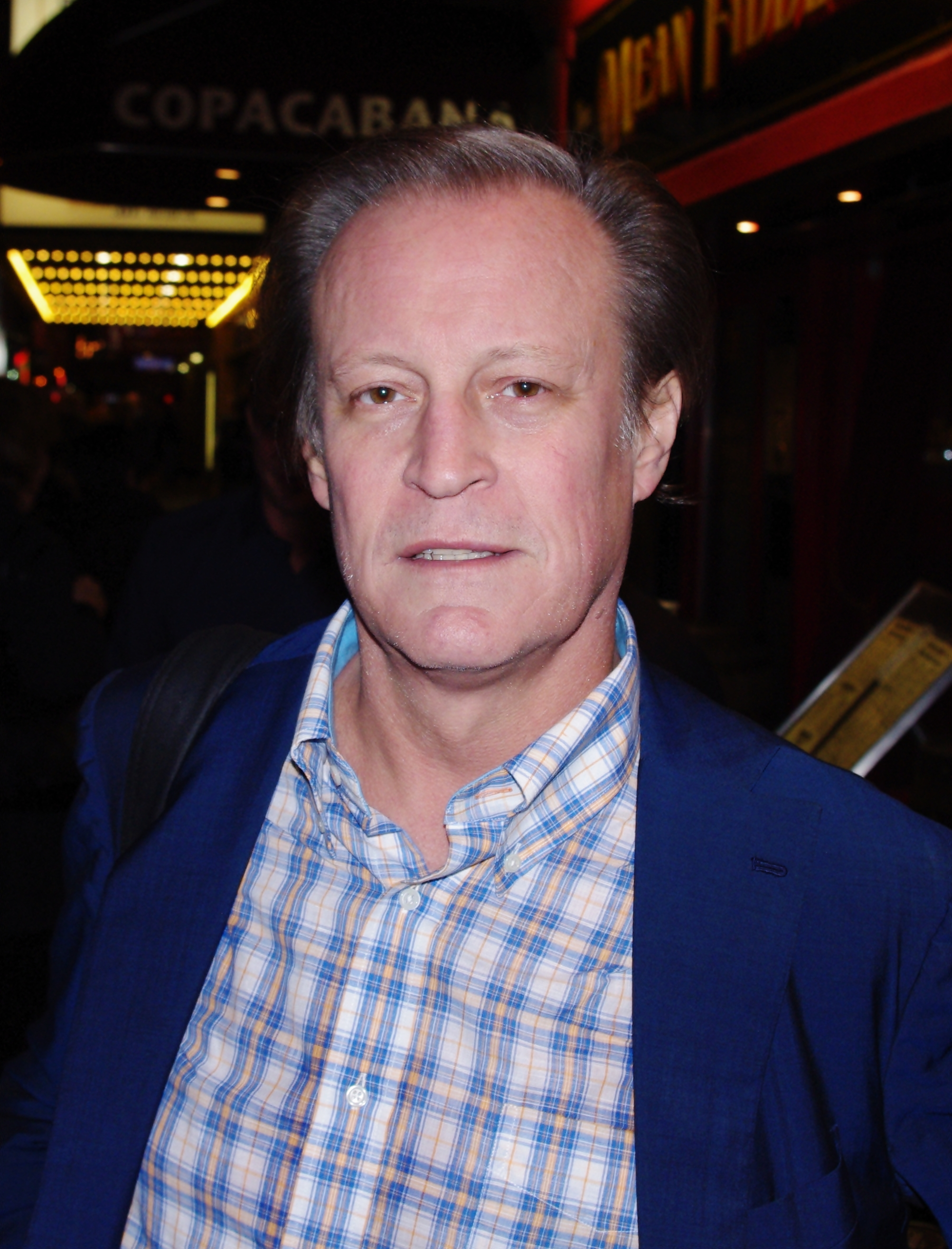
McMullan in 2011 at the book launch party for Michael Musto's Fork on the Left, Knife in the Back

Patrick McMullan is an American photographer, columnist, television personality, and socialite. His photo work focuses on people, particularly A-list celebrities, fashion designers, models, actors, politicians, cultural icons and the power elite.

== Early years ==
McMullan was born in New York City into a Roman Catholic Irish-American family and raised in Huntington, Long Island. He attended New York University, earning a degree in business.

His work as an amateur photographer began when he was in his 20s. His interest in photographing celebrities and famous people evolved with initial encouragement from Andy Warhol while attending nightlife and events in Manhattan, and through their ongoing friendship until Warhol's untimely death in 1987.

== Print Publication ==
McMullan's work appears regularly in such publications as New York Times Magazine, Vogue Magazine, Allure Magazine, Interview, Harper's Bazaar, Details, Ocean Drive, Gotham, Out, The Boulevard Magazine and amNewYork. He is a contributing editor at Vanity Fair and has a weekly column in New York Magazine (called "Party Lines").

== Online Publication ==
On January 1, 2011, McMullan launched his online magazine PMc Magazine. The magazine is a venue for showcasing interesting people, events and art.

== Photo Books ==
As a photo book publisher Patrick McMullan has edited and compiled six photo books:

- Glamour Girls

Large collection (over 1400 images) of photographs of celebrated women spanning Patrick's 30-year career. Focus on society galas, Hollywood parties, New York nightlife and charity events.

- Kiss Kiss

A compilation of over 1,000 black and white and color images of people kissing, spanning 30 years.

- So '80s

A photographic diary of the 1980s decade of the famous figures who defined New York City's nightlife.

- InTents

A decade long photo compilation of fashion and the fascination surrounding the fashion industry using New York's "Bryant Park-based Fashion Week" and the event "7th on Sixth" as a backdrop.

- Secrets of the Riviera

A Photo Essay, of the backstage action at the "Victoria's Secret" fashion show held at the 2000 Cannes Film Festival and the opulent atmosphere of the surrounding A-list parties.

- Men's Show

Photo compilation of men's fashion featuring designers, models and actual men's fashion show images from 1995 - 2000. Designers such as Michael Kors, Calvin Klein, Tommy Hilfiger, Sean John, Marc Jacobs and others are featured.

== Controversy ==
At times, subjects are candidly photographed while McMullan's photographers roam events. New York Times and Gawker have reported that McMullan will remove photos from his website but "for a fee". $10 per photo is substantial with a website that received "as many as one million hits a day" back in 2004. In a 2014 incident at a soiree attended by actor Leonardo DiCaprio, DiCaprio allegedly confronted a photographer for agency Patrick McMullan who had snapped a photo of the actor.

McMullan's name is listed in Jeffrey Epstein's address book, also referred to as the "little black book."
