= Syracuse Herald-Journal =

Evening newspaper in Syracuse, New York

- Type: Evening newspaper
- Format: Broadsheet
- Owner(s): Syracuse Newspapers, Inc.
- Founder: William Randolph Hearst
- Publisher: William Randolph Hearst
- Founded: November 24, 1925
- Ceased publication: September 29, 2001
- Headquarters: Syracuse, New York, U.S.

The Syracuse Herald-Journal (1925–2001) was an evening newspaper in Syracuse, New York, United States, with roots going back to 1839 when it was named the Western State Journal. The final issue — volume 124, number 37,500 — was published on September 29, 2001. The newspaper's name came from the merger of the Syracuse Herald and the Syracuse Journal.

== History ==
Publisher William Randolph Hearst, who had purchased the Syracuse, New York, newspaper the Syracuse Telegram, closed that newspaper on November 24, 1925, with issue No. 925. At that time, the Syracuse Telegram and the Sunday edition, the Syracuse American a.k.a. the Syracuse Sunday American, merged with The Journal, an old Syracuse institution that was established on July 4, 1844. In the days of extremely partisan newspapers, it held the reputation as one of the strongest Republican publications in New York state.

The merger was accomplished after Hearst acquired a controlling interest in The Journal for nearly $1,000,000. in November 1925. The transaction was carried out, and Hearst "sold" the publication for $1,000,000 to Syracuse Newspapers, Inc., a new corporation and publisher of the consolidated paper. After the merger was completed, Hearst was a director of the company and still played a major role in the decision-making.

Before the merger, there were three evening newspapers in Syracuse and "the public was somewhat oversupplied." The merger left two papers in the market: The Herald and the consolidated Journal-Telegram. Like its predecessors, the new publication was delivered in the evening, and the Sunday American was published on Sunday mornings. It was decided that the Journal operating plant and facilities would be used as the office and publishing plant for the combined effort. The Hearst Building at the corner of Genesee and State streets was sold and 100 Hearst employees lost their jobs. The papers were combined as a single Herald-Journal title and bought by S. I. Newhouse in 1939; in 1944, he bought a rival publication, The Post-Standard. Newhouse's company, Advance Publications, discontinued the Herald-Journal and Herald-American in 2001.
