= Syracuse Telegram =

Newspaper in Syracuse, New York

- Type: Daily newspaper
- Format: Broadsheet
- Owner: William R. Hearst (1922)
- Publisher: Syracuse American Newspaper Corp.
- Editor: William R. Hearst (1922)
- Founded: September 22, 1922
- Ceased publication: November 24, 1925
- Headquarters: Hearst Building (old Firestone Building); 400 E. Washington St. Syracuse, New York
- Price: 2 cents (1922)

The Syracuse Telegram was established in 1922 in Syracuse, New York, by William Randolph Hearst. Between the years 1922–1925, the newspaper was published as both Syracuse Telegram and Syracuse Evening Telegram and the Sunday edition was called the Syracuse American, and alternately the Syracuse Sunday American.

In November, 1925, Hearst gained controlling interest in another Syracuse daily, the Syracuse Journal (1899–1929) which he merged with the Telegram. The name was changed to the Journal-Telegram and was later shortened to Syracuse Journal.

The Syracuse Telegram was a sole and separate company from a defunct newspaper called the Syracuse Telegram and Courier which operated during the years 1856 to 1905.

== History ==
The Syracuse Telegram was established in Syracuse, New York, by William Randolph Hearst. It was later consolidated with the Syracuse Journal, another Hearst newspaper in Syracuse. By 1922, Syracuse was the thirteenth city in which Hearst established a daily metropolitan newspaper. His papers had an aggregate circulation of more than 6,000,000 and consumed more than twelve percent of all the newsprint paper used in the United States.

Hearst took full advantage of the economic boom, and starting in 1921, he went on a "buying spree" and purchased three newspapers; the Times in Detroit, the Record in Boston, and the Post-Intelligencer in Seattle. In 1922, he added the Herald in Los Angeles, the Herald in Washington, D.C., established the New York Daily Mirror and started a new daily, the Oakland Post-Enquirer

Hearst stepped into the political arena in New York State and by late 1922 he acquired five Upstate New York papers; the Syracuse Telegram, Rochester Journal, the Post-Express in Albany, the Albany Times Union and the Oswego Daily Press in Fulton, New York.

=== Established, 1922 ===
Hearst purchased the Albany Times-Union in Albany, New York, in November, 1922, soon after a failed 1923 presidential bid. "The chief was still licking his wounds and viewed the Executive Mansion in Albany as a consolation prize." At the same time, he established the Syracuse Telegram and three other Upstate New York papers in order to "broaden his name recognition across upstate as he prepared to run for governor."

The Telegram publishers were pleased with the decision and announced to local readers;

"The decision of Mr. Hearst to establish a metropolitan newspaper here indicates his appreciation of the importance of this city and his conviction that it is a growing, prosperous and progressive center."

The newspaper began operation as Syracuse Evening Telegram on September 25, 1922. The Sunday issue was known as the Syracuse American (also referred to as Syracuse Sunday American) and hit the newsstands on October 1, 1922. Both were published by Hearst's, Syracuse American Newspaper Corporation.

==== Hearst building ====
The old Firestone Building at the corner of East Genesee and South State streets in Syracuse was purchased to house both newspapers. Hearst paid $150,000 for the building which was described as "a large and admirably adapted building in the heart of the Syracuse business district." He also spent an additional $150,000 on the purchase and installation of machinery, presses, typesetting machinery and remodeling the building to make it a "thoroughly modern and a completely equipped newspaper publishing plant."

According to agent, Q. J. Coughlin, who handled the deal;

"The purchase of the building was the quickest real estate transaction ever made in Syracuse. At 10 o'clock on the morning of September 9, 1922 a representative of the Hearst organizations began negotiations for the purchase of the building, at 3 o'clock that afternoon the deal was closed."

"Mr. Hearst's emissaries rushed the installation of equipment in order to begin publication before the Democratic State Convention, held in Syracuse that year. The total construction and remodel of the newly renamed Hearst Building, located at 400 East Genesee Street, spanned a period of 14 days instead of three months, the usual time necessary for such a task. For a period of two weeks, an army of artisans waged a "thrilling and fascinating race against time, working at top speed, morning, night and Sundays" to complete preparation for publication."

The mechanical equipment installed in the plant included a thirty-two page Duplex press, fifteen Intertype typesetting machines, a large stereotyping machine and scores of cases of display type." The business office was headed by J. A. Easton, business manager.

In conformity with Hearst's company policy, "all the men holding executive positions will be Syracusans, and none but Syracuse workmen will be employed to produce the metropolitan Syracuse papers which are eagerly awaited."

Hearst advertised his new publications aggressively in local newspapers;

"The Syracuse Telegram and the Syracuse Sunday American will be metropolitan newspapers in every sense of the term, comparing equally in features with the great newspapers Mr. Hearst owns in Boston, New York, Chicago, San Francisco, Detroit and other big cities throughout the United States."

=== Published, 1922–1925 ===
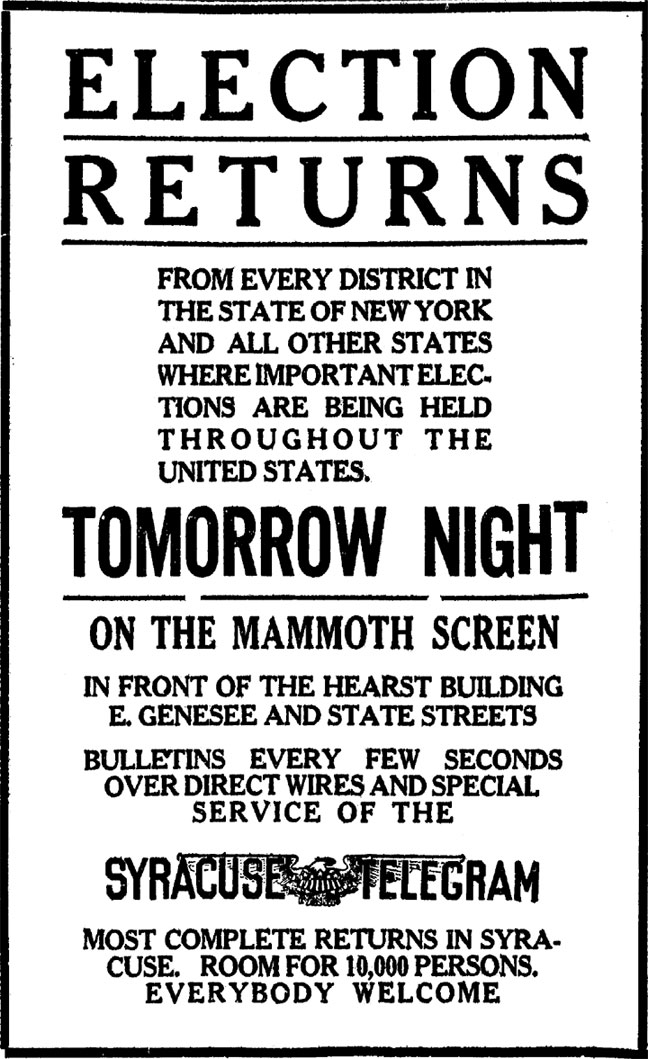
Syracuse Telegram, Election Returns on the mammoth screen, November 6, 1922

Hearst spared no expense with the new headquarters in an attempt to capture the attention of Syracusans. By October 1, 1922, just in time for the 1922 World Series, the company installed an "automatic board" that showed every play, in detail, "within a few seconds after it is made, every strike, every ball, every base hit, two-base hit, three-base hit, home run, double or triple play, error and run is illustrated just as you would see it on the home grounds." The New York Giants beat the New York Yankees in five games that year. Hearst spared no expense with the new headquarters in an attempt to capture the attention of Syracusans. By October 1, 1922, just in time for the 1922 World Series, the company installed an "automatic board" that showed every play, in detail, "within a few seconds after it is made, every strike, every ball, every base hit, two-base hit, three-base hit, home run, double or triple play, error and run is illustrated just as you would see it on the home grounds." The New York Giants beat the New York Yankees in five games that year.

The "mammoth scoreboard" was placed on the front of the Hearst Building at State and Genesee streets at a point where thousands could view the entire game. All of the detail about the game was received by wire direct from the ball grounds and each play was reproduced within a few seconds after the play was made. "The big scoreboard will be operated by expert baseball players, and nothing will be missed in any of the games that is worth seeing."

==== Editorial department ====
Chief editor was R. C. McCabe. Members of the Editorial Department included:

- John F. Cullen, from the Syracuse Journal.
- W. H. Grady, experienced Syracuse newspaper writer.
- Mrs. Helen M. Green, former society editor for The Post-Standard.
- Fremont Hadley, from the Syracuse Journal.
- J. J. Keating, experienced Syracuse newspaper writer.
- Birney P. Lynch, former sporting editor with The Post-Standard.
- Donald M. Luke, from the Syracuse Herald, Syracuse Journal and The Post-Standard.
- Frederick Martin, from the Syracuse Journal.
- T. T. McGowan, experienced Syracuse newspaper writer.
- Mrs. M. L. Parsons, well known Syracuse features writer, formerly with the Syracuse Herald.
- J. F. Phelps, from The Post-Standard.
- J. A. Tiffany, from The Post-Standard and the Syracuse Herald.
- W. H. Stearns, from the Syracuse Herald.
- Mrs. George D. Zett, wrote for the Syracuse Herald under the name of Irene Murray, dramatic and motion picture editor.

==== Logos 1922 ====
The new Syracuse Telegram logo appeared by mid-September, 1922:

Syracuse Telegram, logo, September, 1922

At that same time, Hearst began publishing the Sunday edition, Syracuse American with "Character, Quality, Enterprise and Accuracy – An American Newspaper for the American People":

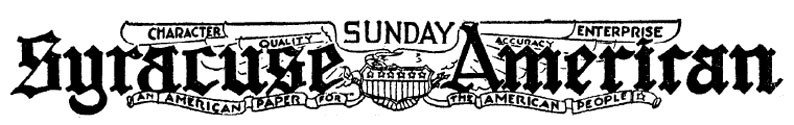
Syracuse American, logo, September, 1922

=== Merger 1925 ===
The Syracuse Telegram was published by Hearst organization until November 24, 1925, when final issue, No. 925, was delivered. At that time, the Syracuse Telegram and Sunday American merged with The Journal, an old Syracuse institution that was established on July 4, 1844. In the days of extremely partisan newspapers, it held the reputation as one of the strongest Republican publications in New York State.

In the three years that William Randolph Hearst published the Syracuse Telegram, he suffered an estimated loss of over $500 a day. Hearst never paid cash for anything. He had borrowed recklessly during the early 1920s to fund his newspaper empire. By the end of 1922, he had exhausted his working capital to pay off existing debt obligations and was still $500,000 short of meeting them all.

The merger was accomplished after Hearst acquired a controlling interest in The Journal for nearly $1,000,000. in November 1925. The transaction was carried out, and Hearst "sold" the publication for $1,000,000 to Syracuse Newspapers, Inc., a new corporation and publisher of the consolidated paper. After the merger was completed, Hearst was a director of the company and still played a major role in the decision making.

Before the merger, there were three evening newspapers in Syracuse and "the public was somewhat oversupplied." The merger left two papers in the market: The Herald and the consolidated Journal-Telegram. Like its predecessors, the new publication was delivered in the evening, and the Sunday American on Sunday mornings. It was decided that the Journal operating plant and facilities would be used as the office and publishing plant for the combined effort. The Hearst Building at the corner of Genesee and State streets was sold and 100 Hearst employees lost their jobs.

=== Syracuse Newspapers Inc. ===
On December 5, 1925, the name was changed to the Journal-Telegram which later reverted to Syracuse Journal. It was published by Syracuse Newspapers Inc., which was established at the time of the merger. The new paper retained all of the old features of the Journal and included several of the Telegram features as well. Harvey D. Burrill, president and publisher at The Journal, remained head of the combined publication, and the price remained the same as it had been before the merger, 3-cents.

The officers of the new corporation, Syracuse Newspapers Inc. included;

- Harvey D. Burrill, president
- Stewart F. Hancock, vice-president
- M. M. Andrews, treasurer
- Louis D. Burrill, secretary

List of directors;

- William Randolph Hearst
- Harvey D. Burrill
- Stewart F. Hancock
