= Riverdale Press =

Weekly newspaper in the Bronx, New York City

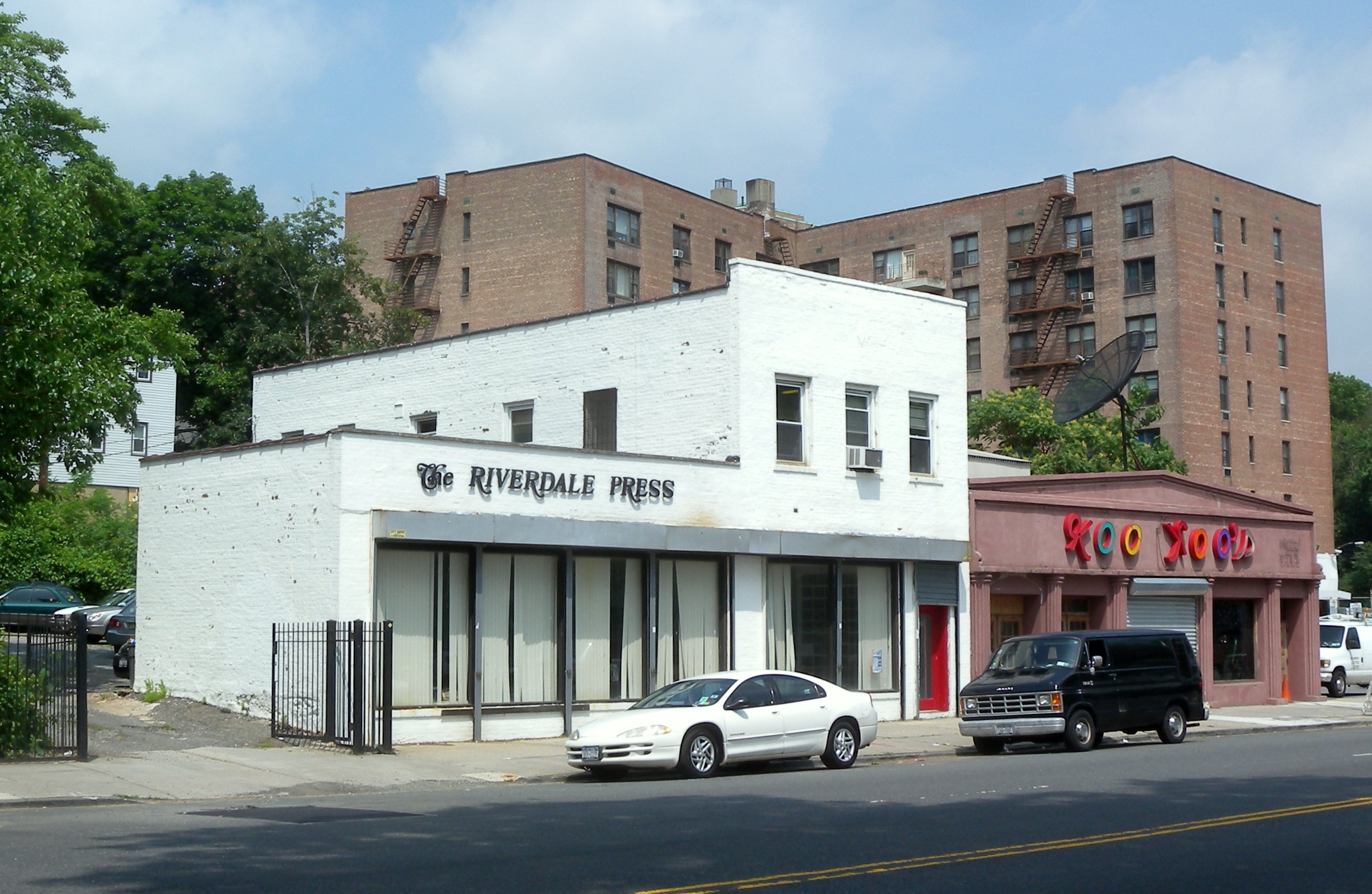
- Former office on Broadway
- Type: Weekly newspaper
- Owner: Richner Communications
- Publisher: Stuart Richner
- Editor: ET Rodriguez
- Founded: 1950; 76 years ago
- Language: English
- City: Bronx, New York City
- Country: United States
- Circulation: 7,152 (as of 2017)
- Sister newspapers: Long Island Herald newspaper chain. Nassau Herald, Wantagh Herald Citizen, The Jewish Star, Oyster Bay Guardian
- Website: riverdalepress.com

The Riverdale Press is a weekly newspaper that covers the Northwest Bronx neighborhoods of Riverdale, Spuyten Duyvil, Kingsbridge, Kingsbridge Heights and Van Cortlandt Village, as well as the Manhattan neighborhood of Marble Hill. It was founded in 1950 by husband and wife David A. Stein and Celia Stein.

== History ==
In the 1950s, The Press fought to rezone Riverdale to preserve private homes and open space threatened by development. It played a key role in the creation of new public schools to accommodate the residents of newly built apartments and in rescuing a large tract of land in Spuyten Duyvil for a park. Later, it advocated creation of a special natural area district to protect the area's distinctive trees and rocks.

In 1978, Bernard Stein succeeded his father as editor, gaining for The Press a reputation as a crusading newspaper. "The Riverdale Press courted controversy and cast a tough, skeptical eye on local officials, who ignored the paper at their peril," wrote The New York Times The Press was the first newspaper to disclose corruption on the city's community school boards; its reporting on the construction of the largest medical waste incinerator in the state in the South Bronx led to the indictment of the chair of the local community board and, eventually, to shuttering the incinerator. For that effort, the paper earned the highest honor of the city's Deadline Club, the James Wright Brown Public Service Award, beating out Newsday and Forbes Magazine, the runners-up.

Bernard Stein's brother, Richard, was the paper's general manager, and also responsible for its design, including the creation of its current flag, used almost continuously since 1971.

On David Stein's death in 1982, the brothers became co-publishers of The Press.

In June 2008, the brothers sold The Press to another pair of brothers, Stuart and Clifford Richner of Richner Communications, publishers of 28 Long Island community newspapers. The Steins remain on the masthead as publishers emeriti.

Michael Hinman was editor between 2017 and 2022, before being promoted to executive editor over more than two dozen publications with the parent company, including The Riverdale Press. During Hinman's tenure, The Press won 40 New York Press Association awards, including top honors for general excellence in 2020 and 2021.

Hinman was later let go from The Press and its sister newspaper group, Herald Community Newspapers, after allegations he mistreated his editorial staff were published by watchdog journalism outlet The Objective.

== Firebombing incident ==
At about 5 a.m. on February 28, 1989, two men hurled firebombs at the offices of The Press. No one was hurt, but the first floor of the two-story building was consumed by the flames.

The bombing took place five days after the newspaper published an editorial defending the right to read Salman Rushdie's novel The Satanic Verses, while the editorial was still on newsstands. A call to 911 claiming responsibility said the newspaper was bombed in retaliation for its editorial.

The Society of Professional Journalists gave the paper's co-publishers Richard and Bernard Stein its First Amendment Award for their courage in continuing to publish despite the severe damage caused to the paper's offices by the firebombing.

The editorial that enraged the bombers is posted on Bernard Stein's blog. For 10 years on the anniversary of the bombing—for as long as Rushdie remained in hiding—the paper published an editorial about the author, both to call attention to his plight and to demonstrate that the bombers had not intimidated the paper.

== Pulitzer Prize ==
In 1998, Press editor and co-publisher Bernard L. Stein won the Pulitzer Prize for Editorial Writing for what the Pulitzer judges called "his gracefully-written editorials on politics and other issues affecting New York City residents." He was also a finalist for the prize in 1987 and 1988.

== Legacy ==
Riverdale Kingsbridge Academy, the public middle school and high school that serves Riverdale and Kingsbridge, is named after Riverdale Press founder David A. Stein.

The New York Press Association names its annual award for overall design excellence the Richard L. Stein Award. The Press continues to win this award, most recently in 2021.

== See also ==
- Norwood News, neighboring community newspaper.
- Mott Haven Herald, Bronx community newspaper.
