= Bernard L. Stein =

American journalist

- Born: Cleveland, Ohio
- Other name: "Buddy"
- Education: Columbia University
- Occupations: journalist; publisher; editor; college professor
- Years active: 1978–2014
- Employers: Hunter College; CUNY Graduate School of Journalism; Hunts Point Express; Mott Haven Herald
- Organization: The Riverdale Press
- Title: co-publisher and editor
- Term: 1978–2008
- Predecessor: David Stein and Celia Stein
- Successor: Stuart Richner and Clifford Richner
- Awards: 1998 Pulitzer Prize for Editorial Writing; Society of Professional Journalists Eugene S. Pulliam First Amendment Award; Lisa and Richard Witten Award for Excellence in Teaching

Bernard L. "Buddy" Stein is an American journalist best known for winning the 1998 Pulitzer Prize for Editorial Writing for "his gracefully-written editorials on politics and other issues affecting New York City residents." He spent his career as the co-publisher and editor of The Riverdale Press, a weekly newspaper serving the Northwest Bronx.

Stein and his brother Richard Stein were awarded the Eugene S. Pulliam First Amendment Award by the Society of Professional Journalists for courage in continuing to publish following the 1989 firebombing of the Riverdale Press office in retaliation for an editorial defending the novelist Salman Rushdie.

He won the Lisa and Richard Witten Award for Excellence in Teaching during his last year at Hunter College in 2014.

== Personal life ==
Bernard L. Stein was born in Cleveland, Ohio, and raised in Riverdale, the Bronx, where his father founded The Riverdale Press in 1950.

He was the editor of his elementary school newspaper, the PS 81 Livewire, and his high school paper, the Science Survey, at the Bronx High School of Science.

Stein earned his bachelor's degree from Columbia University, then moved to Berkeley, California, enrolling as a graduate student in English Literature at the University of California but did not finish that degree.

Stein was one of nearly 800 demonstrators arrested during a sit-in at the UC Berkeley administration building in 1964, in support of the Free Speech Movement. He went on to become one of the founders of the Berkeley chapter of Students for a Democratic Society, and to help found an SDS freedom school in the West Oakland ghetto.

After leaving graduate school, Stein worked at the Mark Twain Papers, the largest archive of Mark Twain's manuscripts in the world, housed at UC Berkeley's Bancroft Library. Instead of staying six months as he planned, he stayed for 12 years, becoming a scholarly editor. He was responsible for establishing definitive editions of Twain's published and unpublished writing, including letters, notebooks, and the novel, A Connecticut Yankee in King Arthur's Court.

Stein was also a member of the editorial board of three radical publications: The Movement, a newspaper affiliated with Student Nonviolent Coordinating Committee and Students for a Democratic Society, and Leviathan and Steps, both short-lived, independent magazines.

Stein moved back to New York in 1978 and succeeded his father as editor of The Riverdale Press. He became co-publisher on his father's retirement in 1979, leading the newspaper for 30 years.

In 1989, the Riverdale Press office was firebombed in response to an editorial that criticized the Iranian head of state for placing a bounty on the head of novelist Salman Rushdie and also criticized American bookstore chains for pulling his novel "The Satanic Verses" from their shelves.

In 1986, The Riverdale Press exposed corruption on the community school board that oversaw Riverdale's schools. It investigated the construction of the largest medical waste incinerator in New York State, in the Port Morris section of South Bronx, in 1991. The work turned into a crusade that led to the indictment of the chair of the local community board, a congressional hearing, and, eventually, to the dismantling of the incinerator, which contrary to its developer's claims, was poisoning the air. As a result, the New York City chapter of the Society of Professional Journalists, The Deadline Club, honored The Riverdale Press with its most prestigious award for community service.

The Riverdale Press won over 400 state and national awards for excellence and was named the best weekly newspaper in New York State eight times during Stein's editorship.

Stein was the second James H. Ottaway Sr. Professor of Journalism at the State University of New York at New Paltz in 2002.

In 2005, Stein joined the faculty of Hunter College of the City University of New York as a professor of journalism. He began teaching at the City University of New York Graduate School of Journalism in 2006 as well.

During his time at Hunter College, Stein founded The Hunts Point Express, a newspaper and online news outlet staffed by students and serving the poorest neighborhoods in the South Bronx.

At the CUNY Graduate School of Journalism, Stein founded a sister paper, the Mott Haven Herald.

Bernard and Richard Stein sold The Riverdale Press in 2008. Stein retired in 2014.
