= Boulevard (New York-based magazine) =

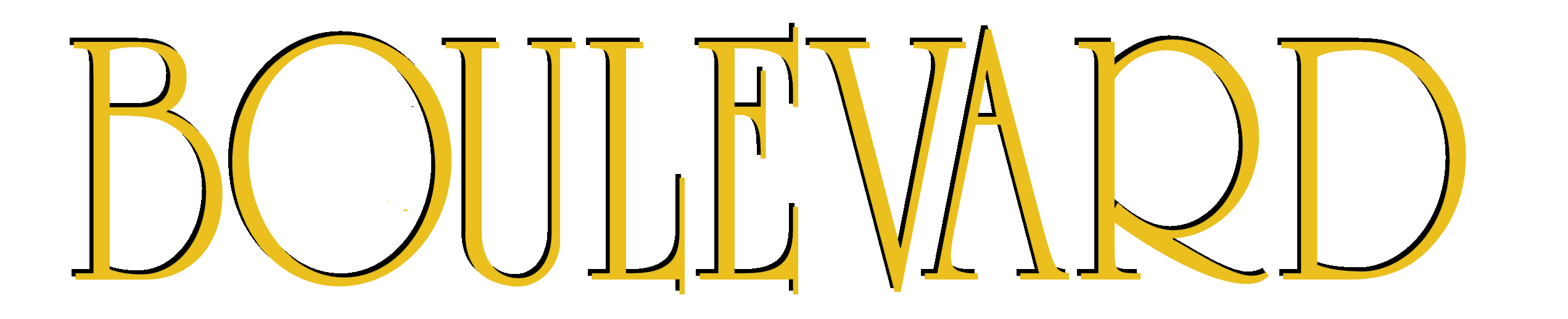
- Categories: Local/Regional interest, entertainment
- Frequency: Quarterly
- Publisher: Angela Susan Anton
- First issue: 1985
- Company: Anton Media Group
- Country: United States
- Language: English
- Website: www.boulevardthemagazine.com

Boulevard (formerly known as The Boulevard) is a Long Island/New York City regional variety magazine owned by Anton Media Group. Founded in 1985, it was well received as a bi-monthly newspaper inserted into selected weekly newspapers in and around Long Island's Gold Coast. The glossy magazine was relaunched in 2016 after a 5-year hiatus as a quarterly publication.

== History ==
The magazine began as a newspaper featuring mostly charity events, minor celebrity stories and special features that catered to the North Shore communities, commonly referred to the "Gold Coast". Boulevard expanded to cover both Nassau and Suffolk counties including The Hamptons. The latest incarnation of Boulevard covers topics of national interest.

== Newspaper to magazine ==
In October 2006, publisher and CEO Angela Susan Anton transformed Boulevard into a glossy magazine, with Dina Lohan, mother of Lindsay Lohan, featured as that the September/October issue cover subject. Patrick McMullan signed on as the magazine's lead photographer.

The magazine's first three issues contained additional sections of Travel, Design, Charity Events, Celebs, The Island, Fashion, Wine & Dine and Photo Gallery. By the fourth issue, the magazine underwent slight design changes, streamlining the colors and better defining the sections. The sections changed were: Charity Events to Events, The Island to Lifestyle, Celebs to Profiles, and a Health Section was added. By October 2007, the magazine added Music, Art, Sports and Business.

Actor Joe Gannascoli, guitarist John Lilley of The Hooters, News 12 News Correspondent Gina Glickman and Q104.3 DJ Jonathan Clarke all have written for the magazine, with Clarke as a regular contributor.

As of April 2008, Boulevard was circulated via Anton Community Newspapers to 70 communities in the North Shore of Nassau County. It is distributed to over 400 locations on Long Island. Readership is about 180,000 (estimated).

In November 2016, Boulevard was circulated via Anton Media Group to the communities in their coverage area. Future issues will be available for purchase on newsstands. The publisher Angela Susan Anton appeared on the cover. New editor-in-chief Jennifer Fauci wrote a history of the publisher and the publication Also included within the pages are features on The Theodore Roosevelt Museum at Old Orchard, Andrew Zimmern, Gregg Allman, Baiting Hollow Farm Vineyard and Horse Rescue, La Selva mansion and owner Debra Del Vecchio's beekeeping, the Broadway show On Your Feet!, New York Fashion Week, Melissa McBride of The Walking Dead (TV series), Jacques Torres, H. Jon Benjamin, Maria Rodale's cookbook Scratch, and Angela Susan Anton's social diary and charities she supports.

== Boulevard Online ==
In April 2009, Boulevard launched a revised, more interactive version of its website and branded it "B Online." The new website offered a more streamlined look and feel as well as the ability to search articles, create events, better handling of multimedia photos and videos as well as the ability to print, pdf and email articles, as well as online advertising, Fitness Made Simple celebrity John Basedow and Q104.3 "Out of the Box" host, Jonathan Clarke, both have blogs on the website.

In November 2016, Boulevard launched a brand new website. On it readers can find new content as well as archives of the previous incarnations of Boulevard.

== Covers ==
Anthony Michael Hall photo by Clifton Parker for Patrick McMullan The Boulevard magazine

- October 2006 Dina Lohan
- December 2006 Dr. Max Gomez
- February 2007 Joan Jett
- April 2007 Clinton Kelly
- June 2007 Laura Bell Bundy
- August 2007 Susan Lucci
- October 2007 Steven Van Zandt
- December 2007 David Hyde Pierce
- February 2008 Jay Leno
- April 2008 Tamara Tunie
- June 2008 Joe Gannascoli, Tony Darrow
- August 2008 Anthony Michael Hall
- October 2008 Good Morning America's Sam Champion
- December 2008 Julia Ormond
- February 2009 James Taylor
- April 2009 Melora Hardin
- June 2009 Rock of Ages
- August 2009 Regina King
- October 2009 Bill Maher
- December 2009 Sandra Lee
- February 2010 Ana Ortiz
- May 2010 Beth Stern
- July 2010 Green Day
- September 2010 Selita Ebanks
- November 2010 Dr. Oz
- December 2010 Bobby Flay
- March 2011 Michelle Rodriguez
- November 2011 Angela Susan Anton
