= Long Island Exchange =

Online news website

- Type: News website
- Owner(s): Long Island Media Inc.
- Publisher: John Colascione
- Editor: Christopher Boyle
- Founded: 2002
- Headquarters: Commack, New York
- Website: longislandexchange.com

Long Island Exchange is an online news website covering Long Island and is owned by Long Island Media Inc.

Launched in 2002, Long Island Exchange covers news and information related to the Long Island region, most specifically, information related to Nassau County and Suffolk County, the two counties generally referred to as "Long Island" by area residents.

Aside from disseminating local news and business related information the publication also interviews celebrities on the red carpet in Manhattan and the Hamptons with Entertainment Journalist Cognac Wellerlane. In 2010, Long Island Exchange interviewed Simon Cowell of American Idol at the 38th International Emmy Awards.

The publication was acquired by Long Island Media Inc. in September 2015 and now operates out of Commack.

== See also ==
- Long Island
- Online Newspapers
- Nassau County
- Suffolk County
