= Mott Haven Herald =

Newspaper in New York City

- Type: Monthly newspaper
- Owner: Craig Newmark Graduate School of Journalism at the City University of New York
- Founder: Bernard L. Stein
- Publisher: Joe Hirsch
- Editor: Joe Hirsch
- Staff writers: 15 students
- Launched: 2009; 16 years ago
- Language: English
- City: Bronx, New York City
- Country: United States
- Circulation: 4000
- Sister newspapers: Hunts Point Express
- Website: motthavenherald.com

The Mott Haven Herald is an online news site that covers the Mott Haven, Port Morris, and Melrose sections of the Bronx in New York City. Founded in the spring of 2009 as a monthly newspaper, the Herald's news stories range from crime, arts, entertainment, and politics to the activities of local people and institutions.

The newspaper's editor is Joe Hirsch. The reporters are students at the Craig Newmark Graduate School of Journalism at the City University of New York.

The newspaper's partner publication is the Hunts Point Express, which is also edited by Hirsch and staffed by Newmark students. The Herald was founded by Bernard L. Stein, former editor of the Riverdale Press, as was The Express, which began publication in 2006.
