= The Leader (Corning) =

American daily newspaper

- Type: Daily newspaper
- Format: Broadsheet
- Owner: USA Today Co.
- Publisher: Rick Emanuel
- Editor: Shawn Vargo
- Founded: May 16, 1847, as The Corning Journal
- Headquarters: 34 West Pulteney Street, Corning, New York 14830, United States
- Circulation: 3,626 (as of 2018)
- ISSN: 1050-1983
- Website: the-leader.com

The Leader is an American daily newspaper published in Corning, New York. It is owned by USA Today Co.

The newspaper covers the city of Corning and surrounding villages such as Addison, Bath and Erwin, in Steuben County, and Horseheads, in Chemung County.

== History ==
The history of The Leader stretches back to two competing newspapers in Corning in the mid-19th century. Its earliest predecessor was The Corning Journal, a weekly newspaper established in 1847 as "an independent family newspaper, free from party politics". George W. Pratt served as editor of the Journal for a half-century, from 1851 until his death in 1906. His son, future Congressman Harry H. Pratt, ran the paper until 1918.

The weekly Corning Sun debuted in 1853, later changing its name to the Southern Tier Farmer and then, in April 1857, the Corning Democrat, to reflect its ties to the Democratic Party. The Democrat established a daily newspaper in 1884, and in 1903 changed its name to The Evening Leader. Another future congressman, Edwin Underhill, served as publisher of The Evening Leader, and oversaw its repudiation of 19th century-style partisan journalism.

The Corning Journal merged with The Evening Leader in 1920. Ownership of the combined afternoon paper remained in the Underhill family until 1972, when it was sold to Howard Publications of California. The paper published as The Evening Leader until 1954, then as the Corning Leader until September 24, 1965, and as The Leader thereafter.

Publication was interrupted during late June 1972 during the Hurricane Agnes flood, which caused millions of dollars of damage to the Leader building. On June 24, 1972, the Leader banded with its competitors to publish a special flood edition called the Leader-Star-Gazette.

In 2002, Lee Enterprises acquired Howard Publications, and then sold the paper two years later to Liberty Group Publishing.

== Sister papers ==
GateHouse Media, which owns The Leader, also owns two other daily newspapers in the Southern Tier, The Evening Tribune of Hornell, and the Wellsville Daily Reporter. The company owns the Steuben Courier of Bath and two other nearby weeklies, The Chronicle-Express of Penn Yan and the Genesee Country Express of Dansville.
