= The Daily Gazette =

American daily newspaper in Schenectady, New York

- Cover of the April 19, 2019 issue of the Daily Gazette
- Type: Daily newspaper
- Format: Broadsheet
- Owner: The Daily Gazette Co.
- Publisher: John DeAugustine
- Editor: Miles Reed
- Founded: 1894
- Headquarters: 2345 Maxon Road Extension; Schenectady, New York; United States
- Circulation: 57,323 (as of 2017)
- ISSN: 2996-1718
- OCLC number: 427365671
- Website: dailygazette.com

The Daily Gazette, from 1902 to 1989 Schenectady Gazette, is an independent, family-owned daily newspaper published in Schenectady, New York. The Daily Gazette also owns and operates The Recorder, The Leader-Herald, The Daily Mail, The Register-Star, The Spotlight, The Colonie Spotlight, The Spot 518, The Adirondack Daily Enterprise, Lake Placid News and Your Niskayuna.

== History ==
The Daily Gazette was founded in 1894 as a weekly newspaper by the Marlette family. It was sold to the Schenectady Printing Association in September of that year, and expanded into a daily newspaper, while still publishing its weekly edition. By 1895, it had a circulation of 3,000 copies a day.

From 1902 to 1989 inclusively, the newspaper's title was Schenectady Gazette. In 1990, the paper changed its name to The Daily Gazette (thus reverting to its initial title but including the definite article in the title). Also in 1990, it began publishing a Sunday edition. In 1996, the Gazette launched its free website, which it turned into a subscriber-based website in 2003. As of 2020, it offers a select number of free articles online per month, with full access available by subscription.

Judith Patrick became editor of the newspaper in 2012. She was the first woman to have the position. The board of directors appointed John DeAugustine as publisher in 2013.

In December 2019, the Gazette Company acquired the Amsterdam Recorder, Courier-Standard-Enterprise and Fulton County Express. In 2021, the Gazette Company acquired The Gloversville Leader Herald. In 2024, the Gazette Company acquired The Register Star in Columbia County and The Daily Mail in Greene County.

In May 2024, the Hume-Lind family agreed to sell the paper to its publisher John DeAugustine. In September 2025, DeAugustine purchased Spotlight Newspapers. In February 2026, he acquired the Adirondack Daily Enterprise and Lake Placid News from Ogden Newspapers.

== In popular culture ==
A prop Daily Gazette front page was featured in the 2012 film The Place Beyond the Pines.

In a scene of the 1945 film Objective, Burma!, journalist character Mark Williams remarks that his column is syndicated in the Gazette.
