= Watkins Glen Review & Express =

Weekly newspaper in Glen, NY

- Type: Weekly newspaper
- Format: Broadsheet
- Owner(s): Finger Lake Media, Inc
- Founded: 1854
- Headquarters: Watkins Glen, New York, United States
- Circulation: 3,200
- Website: www.observer-review.com

The Watkins Glen Review & Express is an American newspaper serving Watkins Glen, New York and the surrounding area. It has a weekly circulation of 3,200. Founded by Samuel Harvey Ferenbaugh, it traces its roots back to its predecessors the Express in 1854 and the Watkins Herald in 1882. It is currently owned by Finger Lake Media.

== History ==
The paper is the product of the merger of the Review and the Express. The Watkins Express traced its roots to the Watkins Republican, founded in June 1854. Founded by J. K. Averill, he managed it only for a single year before selling it. After passing through a series of owners it fell to Levi Gano, who made the paper a strict Republican vehicle and changed the name to the Express.

The Watkins Herald, predecessor to the Review, was founded by Samuel Harvey Ferenbaugh. Born in 1846, Ferenbaugh had apprenticed at the Corning Journal, subsequently founding the Painted Post Times and the Havana Democrat. When the Havana Democrat was moved to Watkins, the name was changed to the Watkins Herald.

Despite a leasing agreement in 1893, Ferenbaugh appears to have maintained ownership of the Herald until 1896, at which point the paper was sold to John Corbett, and the name changed to the Review.

In 1988, the two papers were merged, becoming the Review & Express. In 1998, the paper was purchased by the owners of the nearby Observer; the two papers maintain a shared web presence but are otherwise distinct.
