= Adirondack Daily Enterprise =

Newspaper published in New York, U.S.

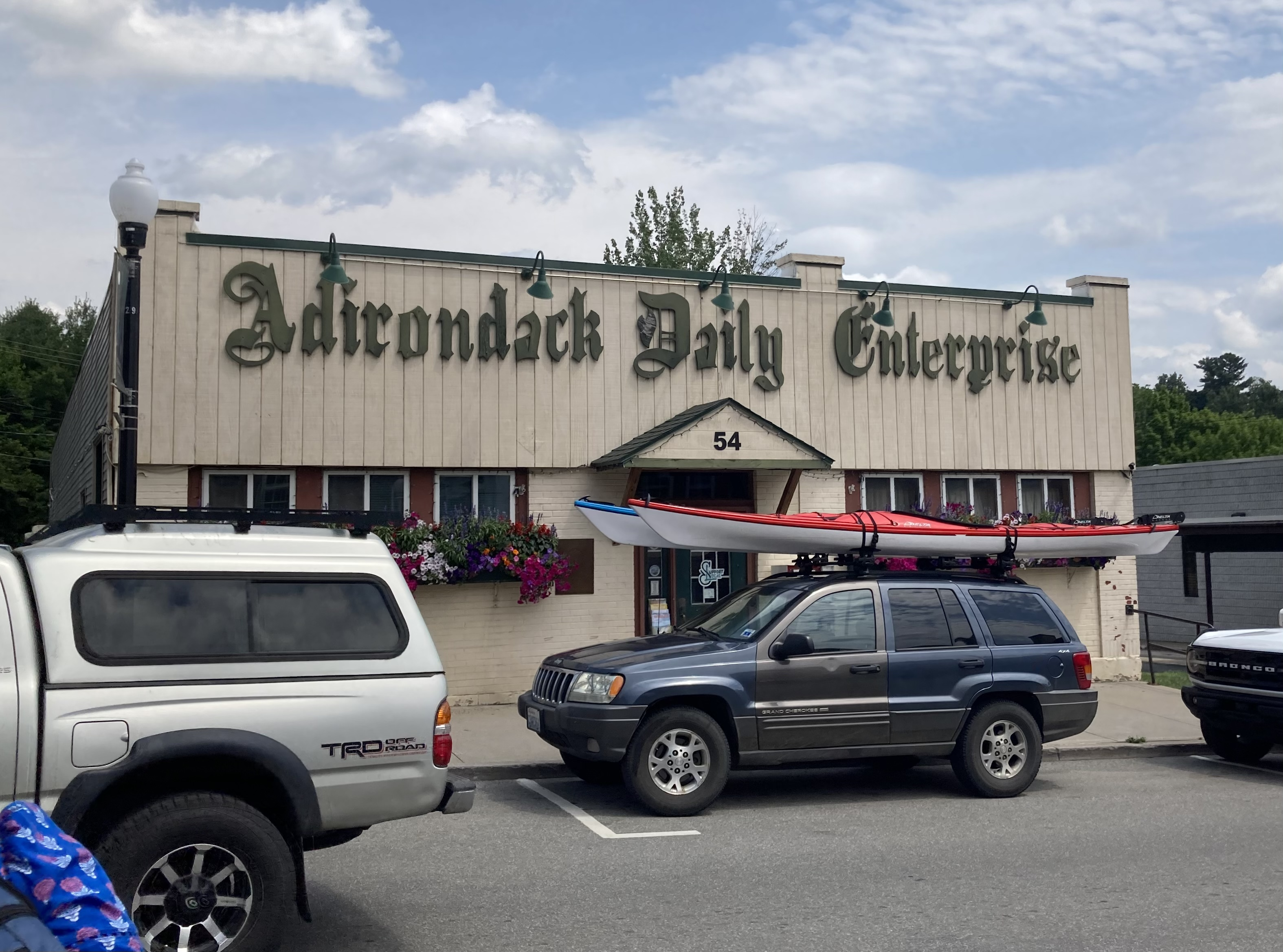
- Offices of the Daily Enterprise in Saranac Lake
- Type: Daily newspaper
- Owner: John DeAugustine
- Publisher: Andy Flynn
- Editor: Elizabeth Izzo
- Headquarters: 54 Broadway, Saranac Lake, New York 12983
- ISSN: 1097-2811
- OCLC number: 13511539
- Website: adirondackdailyenterprise.com

The Adirondack Daily Enterprise is a daily (6 days per week) newspaper published in Saranac Lake, New York. It also covers Lake Placid, New York. The two areas also have in common the two-site Adirondack Medical Center.

== History ==
This newspaper, along with Lake Placid News, was purchased by William M. Doolittle Jr. in 1970. Nearly fifty years later researchers uncovered that the newspaper, which "has trumpeted 'since 1894' for a generation in its masthead," originated in 1895. Moreover, it was "from the consolidation of two papers" (one named Adirondack Pioneer, the other Saranac Lake Enterprise).

The Associated Press includes reports from Adirondack Daily Enterprise. Other newspapers, including The New York Times, pick up some of their scoops and stories.

The newspaper has a history of activism in local matters. They opposed the renaming of a major regional college; their efforts "collected more than 3,200 signatures asking the college not to change its name."

In 2026, Ogden Newspapers sold the Enterprise and the News to John DeAugustine, owner of The Daily Gazette.
