= The Chronicle (Goshen and Chester) =

Magazine

- Type: Weekly newspaper
- Owner: Straus News
- Editor: Robert Quinn
- Founded: 2001
- Website: chroniclenewspaper.com

The Chronicle is a weekly newspaper that covers the communities of Chester and Goshen in New York state.

== History ==
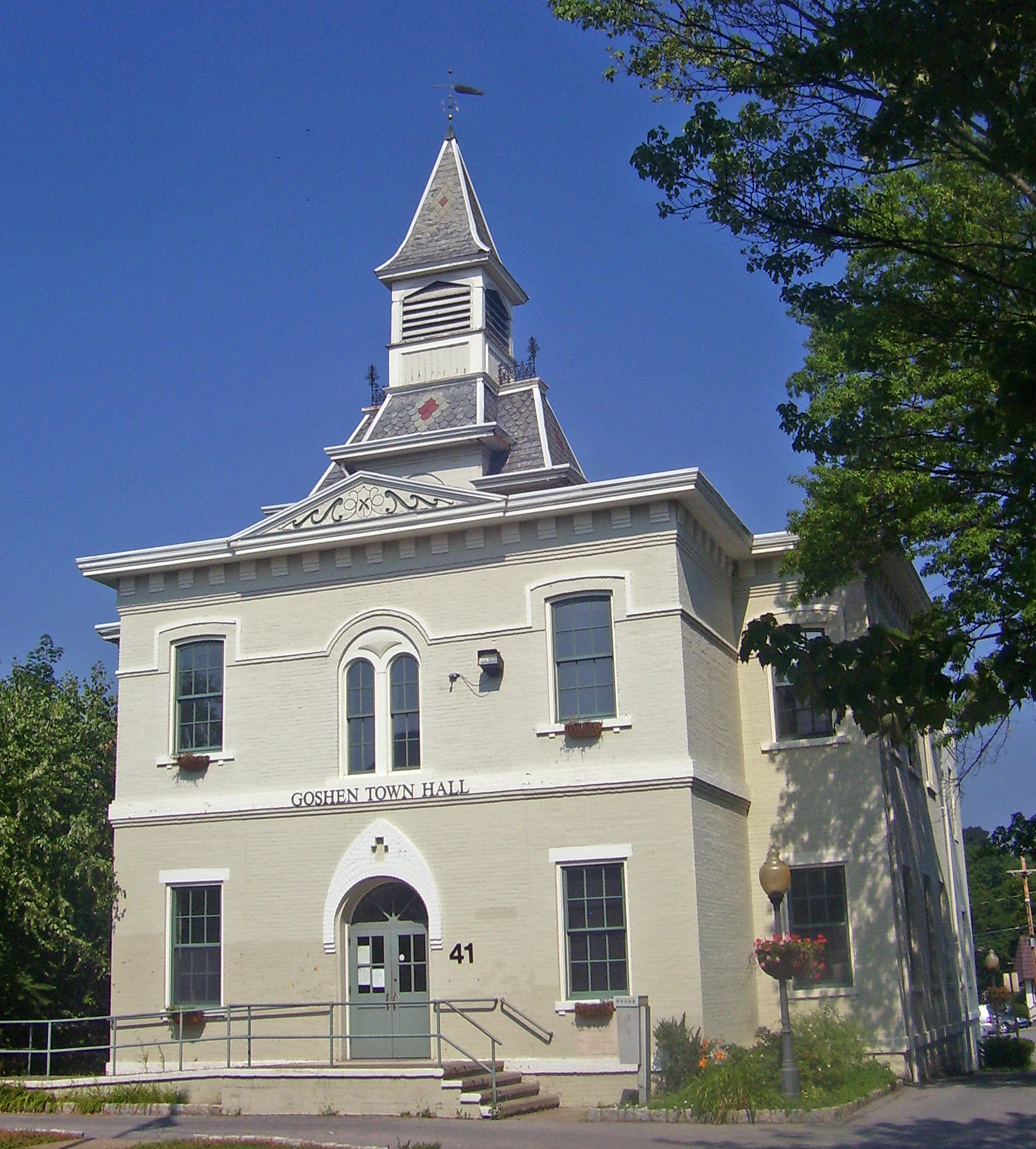
Goshen's Town hall

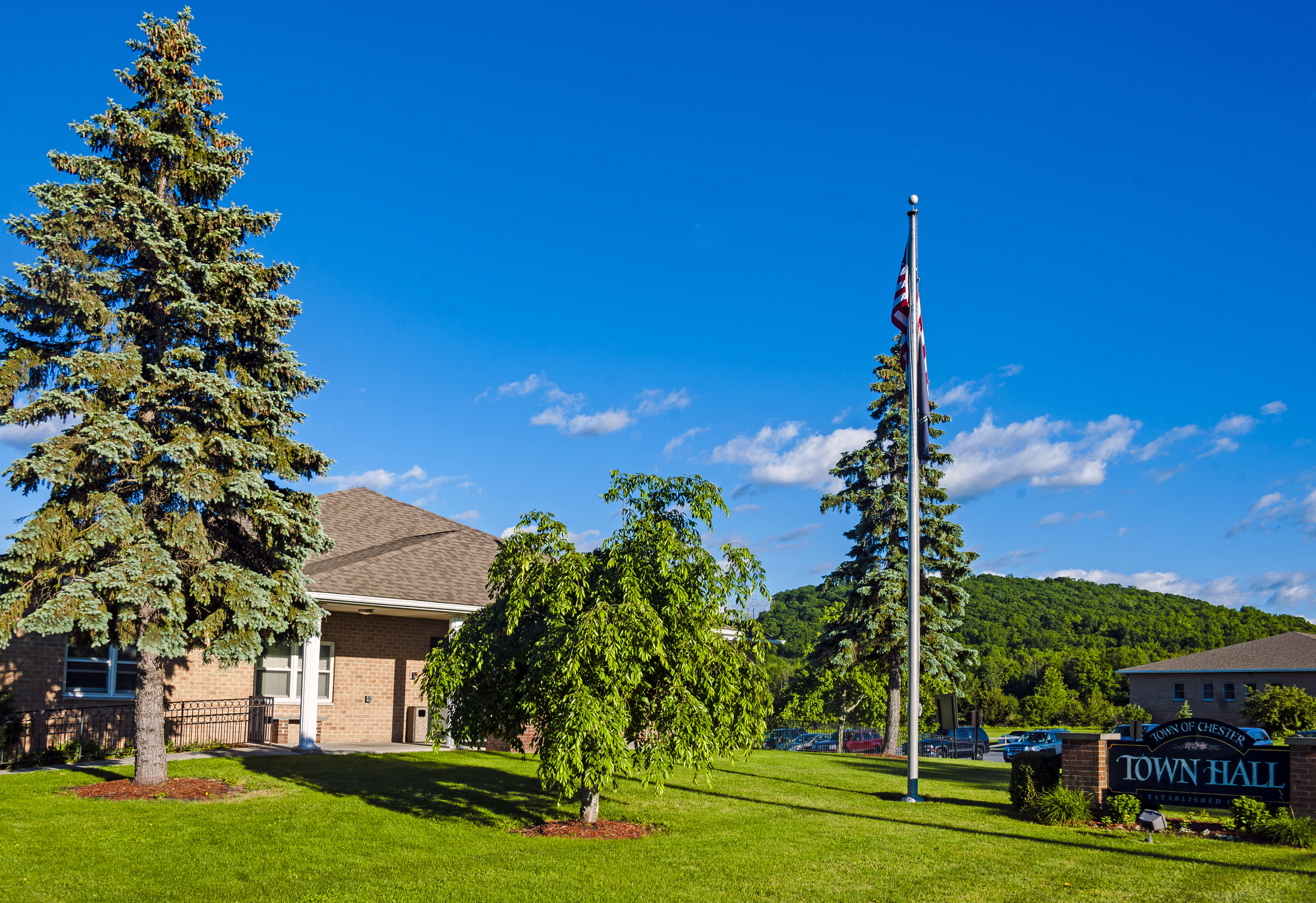
Chester's Town hall

In 1986, the family of R. Peter Straus sold WMCA (AM), a radio station operating in New York City, and over the following 17 years purchased five newspapers and started three more. (By 2014 they were the publishers of "14 local weeklies across New York, New Jersey and Pennsylvania" and five in Manhattan.) The second newspaper they founded was The Chronicle, which began publishing in 2001.

The Chronicle included a local teacher's culinary column, "Rosemary, It's Thyme."

"The identities of two people who posted anonymous comments" on the newspaper's web site was the subject of a 2010 grand jury's subpoena; it was quashed.

In 2014, The Chronicle won a Freedom of Information case for the right "to allow the photocopying of disclosure forms" from the county's government. The concession resulted in "that the county would even post them online." Previously they were told that "while the disclosure forms may be inspected and their contents copied by hand, they could not be photographed or photocopied."
