= Arcade Herald-Courier =

Newspaper published in New York, US

Herald-Courier
- Type: Weekly newspaper
- Format: Broadsheet
- Owner(s): Neighbor to Neighbor News, Inc.
- Publisher: Grant Hamilton
- Editor: Max Borsuk
- Founded: 1891
- Language: English
- Headquarters: Wyoming County, New York, United States
- Circulation: 4,085 (as of 2017)
- Website: herald-courier.com

The Herald-Courier is a newspaper published by Neighbor to Neighbor News, Inc. that serves ten townships and two villages surrounding Arcade, New York, in the United States. It is published on Thursdays. Estimated circulation is 5,000. The publisher is Grant Hamilton, with Max Borsuk as editor.

== History ==
The Arcade Herald was established in 1891 as the Wyoming County Herald under publisher George Chase. In 1895, Chase left town suddenly and did not return. The Herald was sold by the local sheriff in 1897 to Walter F. Arthurs on credit. Chase later reformed and became vice president of the Wyoming County Press Association.

In 1899, the Republican members of the board of supervisors of Wyoming County designated the Herald as newspaper to publish the sessions laws, and in 1916, it was so designated again.

In 1927, the name of the newspaper was changed to the Arcade Herald. In 1945, Arthurs sold the newspaper to Paul F. Dorris. In 1969, the name was changed to the Tri-County Times. In 1981, the name was changed back to the Arcade Herald. In 1986, Kathleen L. Mason became the publisher.

In 2023, the Herald merged with Warsaw's Country Courier to form the Herald-Courier.
