= Catskill Mountain News =

American weekly newspaper

- Type: Weekly newspaper
- Format: Broadsheet
- Owner(s): Joan Lawrence-Bauer
- Editor: Joan Lawrence-Bauer.
- Founded: 1863
- Ceased publication: January 22, 2020
- Headquarters: Arkville, New York, United States
- Circulation: 3,600 copies
- OCLC number: 8433945
- Website: catskillmountainnews.com

The Catskill Mountain News was an American weekly newspaper serving the towns and surrounding environs of Margaretville, Andes, Roxbury and Delaware County, New York. With a final circulation of 3,600, it was both the oldest and the largest paper in the area, latterly available in print and on-line editions. It was independently owned and operated until its last publication in 2020.

== History ==
The News traces its roots to the founding of the Utilitarian in 1863. The first newspaper in the town of Margaretville, the paper was published by Orson M. Allaben. After passing through a number of hands it was purchased by the Catskill Mountain News.

In 1894, the Margaretville Messenger was founded by a stock company, which hired as editor John Grant. It continued to 1902, when it was sold to W. E. Eells, who renamed it the Catskill Mountain News. When Eells died suddenly, just two years later, Clarke Sanford, a local schoolteacher, approached his widow about the paper. Eells's widow offered to let Sanford run it on credit. If he were to make a profit, he would pay her the purchase price; if not, she would reclaim the paper. Sanford agreed to the terms and after a tough initial few years made good on the loan.

Sanford would run the paper for over 60 years, presiding over the expansion of the newspaper. In 1918, he purchased the Utilitarian, altering the News's numbering to date back to that paper's 1863 founding. He also invested in updated Linotype printing, and changed locations as the paper grew.

The paper would be passed on to Clarke's son Roswell, on his death in 1964. In turn it was passed to Roswell's son Richard D. Sanford. By 1990, the paper was struggling, which the younger Sanford believed was a result of low overall economic activity in New York's more rural areas. Sanford noted that with shopping increasingly being concentrated in larger stores in more central cities, advertising in rural towns was less sustaining: "Stamford is about 25 miles out of Oneonta, and the growth of the Oneonta market has had a corresponding negative impact on the retail industry in Stamford." He went on to note the future of the publication was a relentlessly local focus, and that of the weeklies he published Catskill Mountain News was the most robust.

In 2017, the paper was sold to Joan Lawrence-Bauer, a former writer for the News. The News ended publication in 2020.
