= Wellsville Daily Reporter =

Newspaper in Wellsville, New York

- Type: Daily newspaper
- Format: Broadsheet
- Owner: Gannett
- Publisher: Jeff Hayden
- Editor: Chris Potter
- Founded: November 1, 1880
- Headquarters: 159 North Main Street, Wellsville, New York 14895, United States
- Circulation: 4,500 (as of 2017)
- OCLC number: 11876638
- Website: WellsvilleDaily.com

The Wellsville Daily Reporter is an American daily newspaper published Sundays and weekdays in Wellsville, New York. The Daily Reporter is the newspaper of record for Allegany County, New York, and the only daily published in the county. Its Sunday edition is called The Spectator and published in conjunction with The Evening Tribune of Hornell, New York.

== History ==
In 1987, the paper was acquired by Hollinger. Former owner GateHouse Media purchased roughly 160 daily and weekly newspapers from Hollinger in 1997. GateHouse Media, which also owns The Evening Tribune, also owns four other newspapers in the Southern Tier, The Leader daily of Corning, and the weeklies The Chronicle-Express of Penn Yan, Genesee Country Express of Dansville and Steuben Courier of Bath.

In 2017, the paper's print edition was merged into The Spectator, followed by its digital edition and website in 2022.
