= Lake Placid News =

Weekly newspaper published in Lake Placid, New York

- Type: Weekly newspaper
- Owner: John DeAugustine
- Publisher: Andy Flynn
- Editor: Andy Flynn
- Headquarters: PO Box 318, Saranac Lake, NY 12983
- Website: lakeplacidnews.com

Lake Placid News is a weekly community newspaper focused on Lake Placid, New York.

== History ==
This newspaper, along with Adirondack Daily Enterprise, was purchased by William M. Doolittle Jr. in 1970. Other newspapers, including The New York Times, cite some of their stories. It also covers Lake Placid, New York.

In 1977, The New York Times used the phrase "vigorous criticism" to describe opposition by Lake Placid News to "total disregard for the safety of the people who hike the state's trails." The Times noted their reporting about what a local association called "a desecration" of "the only site in the state that has anything to do with the Civil War."

In 2026, Ogden Newspapers sold the Enterprise and the News to John DeAugustine, owner of The Daily Gazette.

== Newspaper family ==
Lake Placid News is part of the Ogden Newspapers family; Ogden is owned by The Nutting Company.
