= The Register Star =

- Type: Daily newspaper
- Format: Broadsheet
- Owner: The Daily Gazette Co.
- Editor: Mary Dempsey
- Founded: 1785
- Language: English
- Headquarters: One Hudson City Centre, Suite 202, Hudson, New York, USA
- Circulation: 4,842 Daily; 4,615 Weekend (as of 2011)
- Website: registerstar.com

The Register Star is a daily newspaper published in Hudson, New York and covering all of Columbia County, New York.

In 2024, the newspaper was sold by Johnson Newspaper Corp to The Daily Gazette Co.
