= The Evening Tribune (Hornell) =

Newspaper in Hornell, New York

- Type: Daily newspaper
- Format: Broadsheet
- Owner: USA Today Co.
- Publisher: Rick Emanuel
- Editor: Chris Potter
- Founded: c. 1873, as Hornellsville Evening Tribune
- Headquarters: 32 Broadway Mall, Hornell, New York 14843, United States
- Circulation: 7,562 Daily; 10,800 Sunday (as of 2011)
- OCLC number: 11992425
- Website: eveningtribune.com

The Evening Tribune is an American daily newspaper published weekday mornings and on Sundays (as The Spectator) in Hornell, New York.

In addition to the city of Hornell, the Tribune and Spectator circulate in several villages and towns of eastern Allegany County and western Steuben County, including Alfred, Almond, Andover, Angelica, Arkport, Canaseraga and Canisteo.

The paper is considered a paper of public record by the Steuben County clerk's office.

== History ==
The paper was originally published by the W. H. Greenhow Corporation, whose initials were used in the call letters for WWHG, its radio station, founded in 1946, whose studios were on the upper floor in the newspaper's building. In 1987, the paper was acquired by Hollinger.

Former owner GateHouse Media purchased roughly 160 daily and weekly newspapers from Hollinger in 1997. GateHouse Media, which owns the Tribune and Spectator, also owns two other daily newspapers in the Southern Tier, The Leader of Corning in Steuben County, and the Wellsville Daily Reporter in Allegany County. The company owns the Steuben Courier of Bath and two other nearby weeklies, The Chronicle-Express of Penn Yan and the Genesee Country Express of Dansville.
