= The Post-Standard =

Daily newspaper published in Syracuse, New York, U.S.

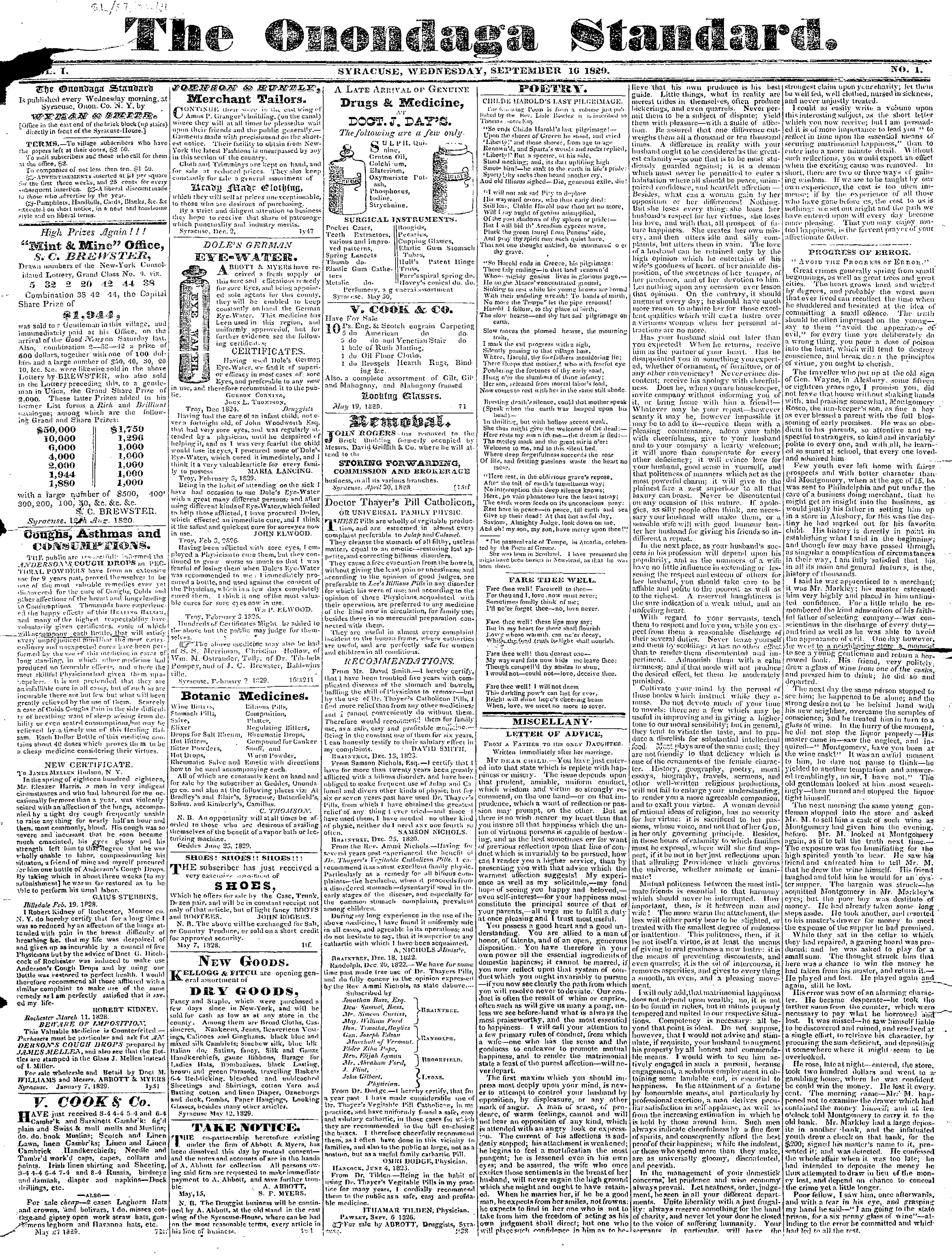
- The first issue of The Onondaga Standard, September 10, 1829
- Type: Daily newspaper
- Format: Broadsheet
- Owner: Advance Publications
- President: Timothy R. Kennedy
- Founded: 1829 (as The Onondaga Standard)
- Headquarters: 220 S. Warren St. Syracuse, New York 13202; United States
- Circulation: 71,101 daily 120,363 Sunday (as of 2015)
- Website: syracuse.com

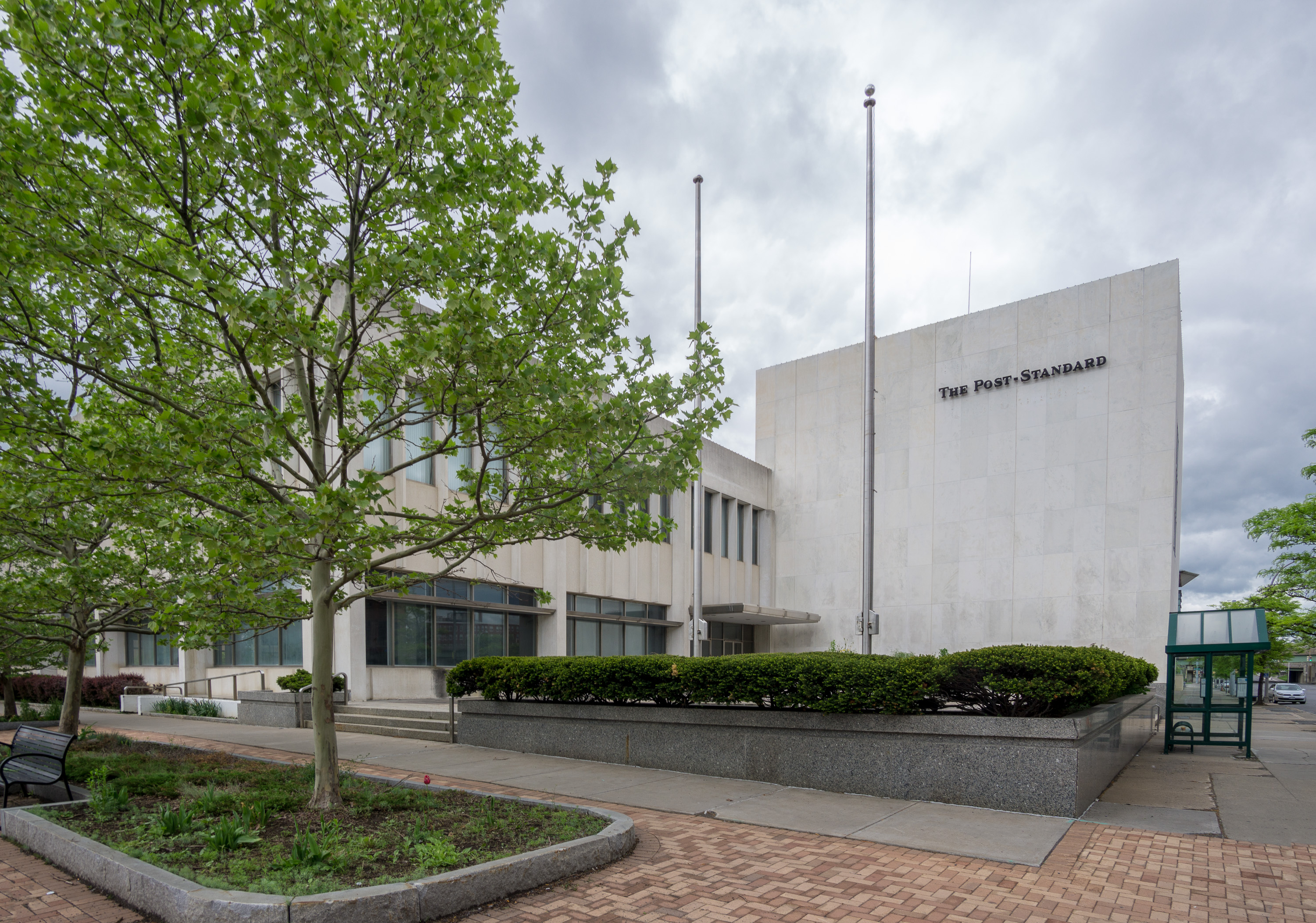
The Post-Standard building in downtown Syracuse.

The Post-Standard is a newspaper serving the greater Syracuse, New York, metro area. Published by Advance Publications, it and sister website Syracuse.com are among the consumer brands of Advance Media New York, alongside NYUp.com and The Good Life: Central New York magazine. The Post-Standard is published seven days a week and is home-delivered to subscribers on Tuesday, Thursday and Sunday.

== History ==
The Post-Standard was founded in 1829 as The Onondaga Standard. The first issue was published on September 10, 1829, after Vivus W. Smith consolidated the Onondaga Journal with the Syracuse Advertiser under The Onondaga Standard name. Through the 1800s, it was known variously as The Weekly Standard, The Daily Standard, and The Syracuse Standard.

On July 10, 1894, The Syracuse Post was first published. On December 26, 1898, the owners of The Daily Standard and The Syracuse Post merged the papers to form The Post-Standard. The first issue of the newly merged paper was published on January 1, 1899. The merged company was based at 136 E. Genesee St. in Syracuse.

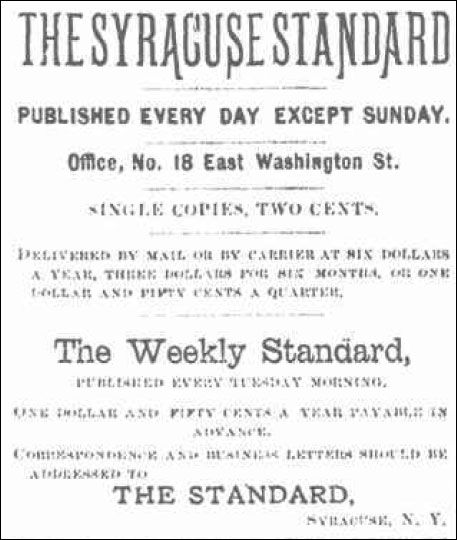
Syracuse Standard logo, January 3, 1884

By 1900, Syracuse had a population of 135,000, and the publication had a "sworn circulation" of 17,575 daily, 12,571 semi-weekly, and 15,195 on Sunday. It was touted as "a clean, wholesome, aggressive, up-to-date newspaper." The newspaper bragged that "The Post-Standard has a larger circulation than any other daily paper between Greater New York and Rochester."

On July 23, 1939, publisher Samuel I. Newhouse entered the Syracuse market, buying Syracuse's two evening papers, the Syracuse Herald and the Syracuse Journal, and then merging them into the Syracuse Herald-Journal. He also launched a Sunday paper, the Herald American. In 1944, Newhouse bought The Post-Standard. (Later, Newhouse became the benefactor of Syracuse University's acclaimed S.I. Newhouse School of Public Communications.)

The news and editorial departments of the newspapers operated independently from each other for decades. The Post-Standard was published in the morning, the Herald-Journal in the afternoon, and the Herald American on Sundays. Until 1971, when a new building on Clinton Square opened, the newspapers were published in separate locations. The newspapers became known collectively as The Syracuse Newspapers. By the turn of the century, it became apparent that Syracuse could no longer support two newspapers. The Herald-Journal closed in September 2001, and was merged into The Post-Standard.

The newspaper company was an early adopter of digital media. The company launched digital audio services delivered via telephone in the early 1990s, under the direction of John Mariani and Stan Linhorst. The company, under then Director of New Media Stan Linhorst, started Syracuse.com in November 1994. The newspaper collaborated with Syracuse University's iSchool on the launch. At first, the website was branded Syracuse OnLine, and until the summer of 1995 operated on a server hosted at syr.edu. Few newspapers were establishing websites then; most were partnering with CompuServe, Prodigy (online service), America Online, or other proprietary systems.

In December 2001, the newspaper began printing on a new offset lithography press made in Switzerland by Wifag. The 750-ton five-story press allowed for color on nearly every page, and the newspaper soon began using the front-page motto "America's Most Colorful Paper". The press is housed in a 45,000-square-foot, glass-enclosed "press hall" constructed at the back of the newspaper building. The Wifag press replaced a 33-year-old machine using the letterpress technique. The new press and building expansion cost $39.5 million.

== 21st century ==
The newspaper is owned by the Newhouse family's Advance Publications, which also publishes the Staten Island Advance, The Star-Ledger and The Jersey Journal in New Jersey; The Oregonian in Portland; and The Plain Dealer in Cleveland. The Newhouse family also owns Conde Nast magazines.

In 2012, Advance established a new business structure and company, Syracuse Media Group, to make a digital push. The news/editorial, advertising and marketing staffs were incorporated into that company. The offices moved to 220 South Warren Street, Syracuse. Support services for The Post-Standard, including the press and press staff, remain in the Clinton Square building at 101 North Salina Street, Syracuse. During this announcement the newspaper also announced that beginning on January 1, 2013, the paper would change its delivery to two full-sized editions on Tuesdays and Thursdays, along with its normal Sunday edition. The remaining days of the week would be smaller versions with only two sections. In 2015, the Syracuse Media Group name changed to Advance Media New York, reflecting the company's wider geographic ambition. News coverage is overseen by Director of Content John Lammers. Advertising and marketing are overseen by Michele Sardinia, vice president of digital solutions, William Allison, vice president of sales, and Annette Peters, marketing director. Circulation and customer service are overseen by Thomas Brown.

The circulation of The Post-Standard in the first quarter of 2015 was 120,363 on Sunday, 71,101 on its home-delivered days (Tuesday and Thursday), and an average of 33,000 on its non-delivery days.

Sean Kirst is a featured news columnist and Bud Poliquin is a featured sports columnist. Kirst was the winner of the 2008 Ernie Pyle Journalism Award for human interest writing, given by the Scripps Howard Foundation to the newspaper writer nationwide who most exemplifies the works of Pyle, a famed World War II correspondent.

=== Editorial board ===
Marie Morelli is Editorial Opinions Leader. Others on the editorial board include Chairman Stephen A. Rogers, President Tim Kennedy, and Director of Special Projects Stan Linhorst. The board meets regularly and often hosts newsmakers or community groups.

== Awards ==
The Post-Standard was named among the "10 best newspapers in America with a circulation of under 100,000" by Al Neuharth of USA Today.

In June 2015, the New York State Associated Press Association awarded The Post-Standard its Newspaper of Distinction award. The newspaper won the award five years in a row from 2005 through 2009.

In July 2015, the New York News Publishers Association gave eight first-place awards to The Post-Standard, the most of any newspaper in its circulation category.

The Scarborough market research company ranks Syracuse.com as the No. 1 newspaper website in the nation in terms of market penetration. Scarborough ranks The Post-Standard Sunday newspaper No. 3 in the U.S.

The Pew Research Center's 2012 Project for Excellence in Journalism ranked The Post-Standard's 2011 market penetration ("the number of papers sold as a percentage of households in a given market") as 64%, or the fourth best in the country.

=== Investigations ===
In the late 1970s, The Post-Standard became more aggressive in its investigative coverage. In the 2000s, the paper published in-depth investigative pieces focusing especially on the inner workings of Albany, including Gov. George Pataki's office and the New York Legislature. Other investigations have focused on the allocation of state-borrowed money by the leaders of the State Senate and Assembly; and on controversy over the secretive sale of public lands along the Erie Canal by the New York State Canal Corporation for less than the land's market value.

In mid-2014, the newspaper began publishing stories from reporter John O’Brien, who uncovered serious allegations about the 1994 disappearance of Heidi Allen. The reporting raised doubts about whether the wrong person was imprisoned for her presumed killing. In dozens of stories since, O’Brien exposed flaws in the investigation and prosecution.

In 2014, Douglass Dowty won a state Associated Press first-place award for a story exposing New York state's secretive punishment of civil confinement.

Michelle Breidenbach and Mike McAndrew revealed the misappropriation of state Empire Zone tax breaks. Their series, published 2005–2007, showed how New York state spent hundreds of millions in tax dollars on companies that had done little or nothing to deserve it. The newspaper successfully sued the state to force the release of records. The state was forced to end the program. Among the awards won by the series were the 2007 Gerald Loeb Award, which honors the nation's best business journalism; an in-depth reporting award from Capitolbeat, a national organization for reporters who cover state and local governments; and the First Amendment award from Associated Press Managing Editors, an association of 1,500 newspapers in the U.S. and Canada.

In 2006, Breidenbach exposed wasteful spending at the New York Power Authority.

Beginning with a 2004 investigation, Breidenbach began tracking state legislators' slush funds. Her reporting revealed how state government circumvented normal borrowing policies and laws and instead funnels borrowed money through state authorities, primarily, Empire State Development and the Dormitory Authority.

In 2003, Breidenbach's reporting revealed how the state Thruway Authority and its subsidiary, Canal Corp., granted exclusive development rights.

In 2000, staff writers Mark Libbon, James T. Mulder, and Rick Moriarty explained the forces that caused Central New York to lose its population in the 1990s. The "Where We're Going" series sparked widespread discussion about the region's future and its economic development policies. The series won recognition from the state Associated Press and the state Publisher's Association.

== Other products from The Post-Standard staff ==
The Post-Standard’s parent company, Advance Media, operates several other media. Among them:

- High School Sports Network, covering all high schools and their teams in Section III of Central New York and select schools beyond. The Network feeds content to Syracuse.com, the HS Sports app for smartphones, and The Post-Standard’s Sports and Neighbors sections.
- The ePost-Standard, which provides a complete replica of the printed newspaper as well as additional content for subscribers.
- The Good Life: Central New York, a bimonthly glossy magazine. It is available on newsstands as well as on the ePost-Standard.
- Visitor Guide, a quarterly magazine for Syracuse, New York, visitors. It is available in local hotel rooms as well as on the ePost-Standard.
- NewYorkUpstate.com, a website covering Upstate New York, launched in 2015.

== Community engagement ==
Since 1988, The Post-Standard has been challenging people of Central New York every winter by hiding a treasure hunt medallion in a public park in Onondaga County. Each day during the treasure hunt, The Post-Standard and Syracuse.com publish clues pointing treasure hunters to its location. The person who finds the medallion wins $1,000, double that if they are a newspaper subscriber. The medallion hunt coincides with Syracuse's annual Winterfest and the schools' winter break. In recent years, the medallion has been found at the Camillus Erie Canal Park, Onondaga Lake Park, and Green Lakes State Park.

The company conducts an annual holiday fund drive, organizing employees and dozens of community organizations to hawk special editions of donated newspapers. The campaign started in 1932, during the depths of The Great Depression, to buy coal for families who could not afford to heat their homes. Donations now go to the Christmas Bureau, sponsored by the United Way and The Salvation Army, to provide gifts, food, clothing and other support for local families in need. Early each December, the drive raises more than $50,000 each year. For decades, this was known as the Old Newsboys campaign, and recently became known as Hope for the Holidays.

In 2013, the company launched an annual "Volunteer of the Year" award. The honoree wins $5,000.

In 2015, the company partnered with the Landmark Theatre to launch the Syracuse High School Theatre Awards.

For decades, The Post-Standard has conducted an annual spelling bee. In recent years, the paper partnered with WCNY, which broadcasts the finale.

The company conducts annual golf and bowling tournaments, each with divisions for men, women and seniors.

Since its formation, Syracuse Media Group has hosted frequent workshops on using digital tools. Workshops have taken place at the headquarters’ building on Warren Street as well as at libraries and senior centers. Among them are how to use digital tablets, how to take better pictures with smart phones, and how to make use of social media.

In 2014, the company began hosting special events featuring news staffers with special expertise. Among them have been Talkin' Hoops with SU basketball writers Donna Ditota and Mike Waters; Talkin' Fish with outdoors writer David Figura; and CNY Conversations Live with Stan Linhorst, who conducts a weekly Q&A on leadership and innovation.

The company sponsors or supports several community organizations. Among them are Syracuse Jazz Fest, Syracuse Crunch, Syracuse Stage, Symphoria, Syracuse Opera, Onondaga Historical Association, Landmark Theatre, Taste of Syracuse and Centerstate CEO economic development organization.

== War-zone coverage ==
Reporters and photographers from The Post-Standard have provided coverage from conflicts that drew American troops, often accompanying soldiers from the 10th Mountain Division based at nearby Fort Drum or troops with Reserve/Guard units activated from Syracuse. Among them:

Afghanistan, 2008: Dave Tobin covered combat by the New York Army National Guard's 27th Infantry Brigade Combat Team.

Iraq, 2006: Reporter Hart Seely and photographer Gloria Wright covered soldiers from the 10th Mountain Division.

Iraq, 2005: Reporter Hart Seely and photographer Li-Hua Lan covered soldiers from the 10th Mountain Division.

Afghanistan, 2002: John Berry covered 10th Mountain Division soldiers.

Bosnia, 1993: Frank Ordonez documented the despair, fear, and pain of people caught in civil war in the former Yugoslavia.

Somalia, 1992: Reporter Tom Foster and photographer Tim Reese covered the 10th Mountain Division's deployment in Somalia.

Kuwait/Iraq, 1991: Stephanie Gibbs covered the 174th Fighter Wing, an Air National Guard unit from Syracuse, and the 8th Tank Battalion, a Marine Corps reserve unit from Mattydale.

== See also ==
- Onondaga Gazette
