= Anton Media Group =

American print media company

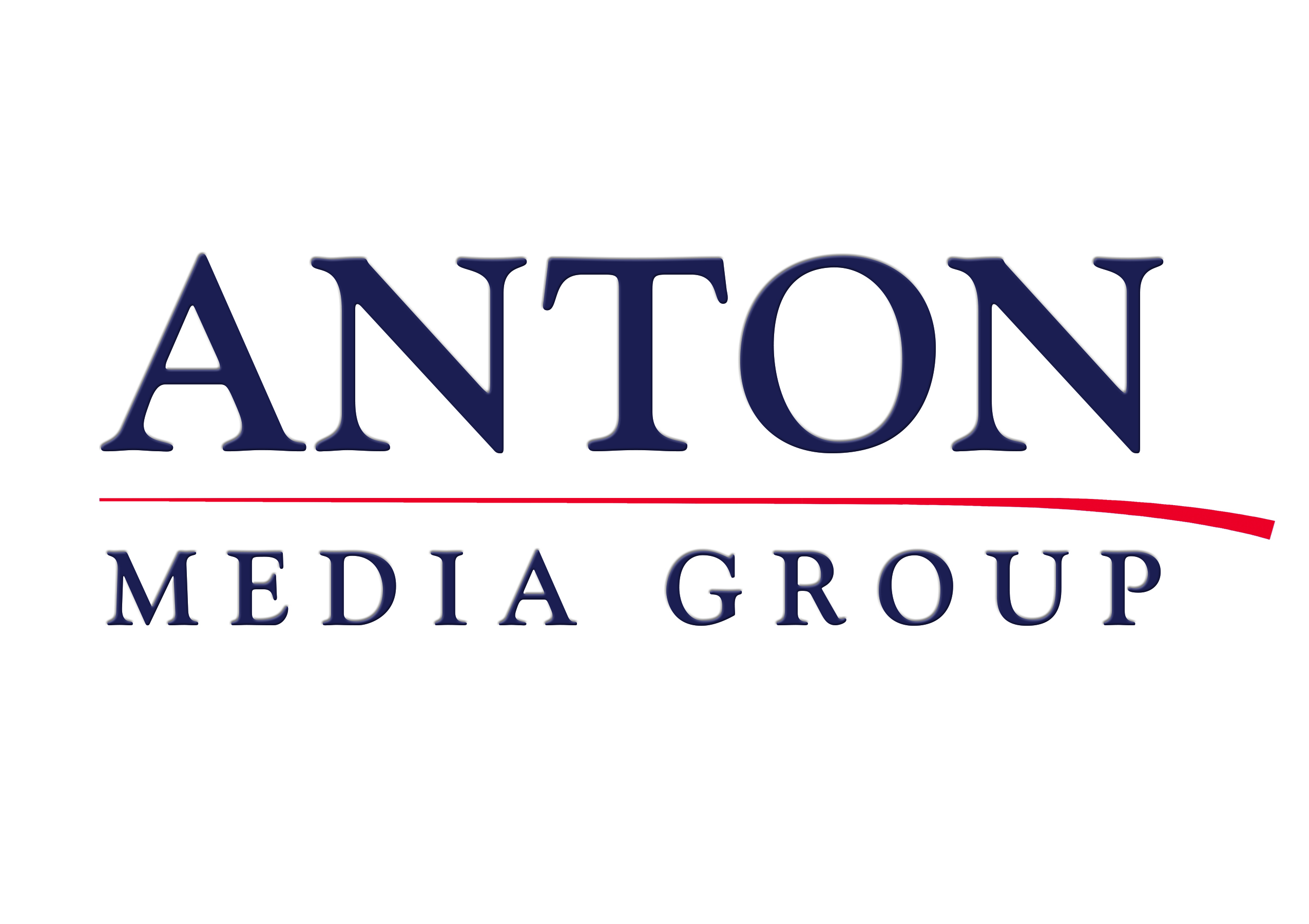
Anton Media Group Corporate Logo

Anton Media Group, formerly Anton Community Newspapers, and also known by its legal name Long Island Community Newspapers, Inc. is a print media company based in Mineola, New York, on Long Island in Nassau County and produces 17 weekly newspapers in Nassau County as well as Long Island Weekly and special sections such as Healthy Living, Camps & Schools, and Dining Guides. Anton Community Newspapers is one of the largest privately owned newspaper companies in New York State.

The current Anton Media Group stems from the 1984 purchase by Karl V. Anton, Jr. of Community Newspapers, Inc., a chain of eight community newspapers on the North Shore of Long Island, from Edward Higgins. By fall, Anton had moved the company's headquarters from Glen Cove, New York, to Mineola, changed the corporate name to Long Island Community Newspapers, and started expanding the chain rapidly, both with purchases and creation of new titles, such as Garden City Life in 1985 and the Hicksville Illustrated News in 1986.

Today, Anton Media Group publishes 17 weekly newspapers in Nassau County, New York, in addition to other bimonthly publications. Anton Media Group serves Long Island's famed Gold Coast area.

After Karl Anton's death in 2000, his wife, Angela Susan Anton, became the publisher and CEO of Anton Media Group. She sold the company in May 2024 to Schneps Media.

== Publications ==
The current publications for Anton Media Group are:

=== Weekly newspapers ===
- The Farmingdale Observer (1960-present)
- Floral Park Dispatch (1927-2016)
- Garden City Life (1985-present)
- Glen Cove Record-Pilot (1917-present)
- Great Neck Record (1908-present)
- Hicksville Illustrated News (1986-present)
- The New Hyde Park Illustrated News (1930-present)
- Levittown Tribune (1948-present)
- Long Island Weekly
- Massapequa Observer (1959-present)
- Manhasset Press (1932-present)
- Mineola American (1952-present)
- Oyster Bay Enterprise-Pilot (1880-present)
- Plainview-Old Bethpage Herald (1956-present)
- Port Washington News (1903-present)
- Syosset-Jericho Tribune (1958-present)
- The Roslyn News (1877-present)
- The Westbury Times (1907-present)

=== Magazines ===
- Boulevard (2006–2011; 2016–2017)
- Great Neck Record Magazine
- Gold Coast Magazine (2014-2016)
- Manhasset Press Magazine
- Port Washington News Magazine
- Roslyn News Magazine (2016-present)
