= Onondaga Gazette =

- Type: Daily newspaper
- Format: Broadsheet
- Owner: Lewis H. Redfield
- Editor: Lewis H. Redfield
- Founded: April 2, 1823
- Headquarters: Syracuse, New York

The Onondaga Gazette was established on April 2, 1823, in Syracuse, New York. It was published under various names until it came into the hands of Lewis H. Redfield who "made a real and lasting news sheet of it."

Preceding this publication, there was another paper in Syracuse called the Onondaga Gazette. It was started in 1816 by Evander Morse and poet-author, William Ray, as editor. The name was shortly changed to The Journal and was purchased by Vivius Smith. The publication was soon consolidated with another newspaper and was renamed to The Standard in 1829.
