= Genesee Country Express =

- Type: Newspaper
- Owner: Gannett
- City: Dansville, New York
- Website: dansvilleonline.com

The Genesee Country Express is a newspaper published in Dansville in the U.S. state of New York. It covers the town of Dansville and the surrounding communities of Southern Livingston and Northern Steuben counties, New York, and has a circulation of 2,710 copies. It is considered a paper of local record by the Livingston County Clerk's office.

The newspaper is owned by Gatehouse Media Inc.

== History ==
The Genesee Country Express was created in 1931 by the merging of the Dansville Advertiser and the Dansville Express. The Dansville Advertiser had been started in 1860 by A.O. Bunnell; the Dansville Express was started in 1865 by F.J. Robbins. The Dansville Advertiser stopped publishing in 1915, when Bunnell decided to close paper. It was re-started 10 years later, in 1925, by Ernest Quick. Quick purchased the Dansville Express from Oscar and Edwin Woodruff.

By 1925, Quick was editing and publishing both the Dansville Express and Dansville Advertiser. He merged the two papers in 1931 to form the Genesee Country Express and Advertiser.

After Quick's death in 1943, Edmund J Kessler and Burndette C. Clarke of Arcade purchased the paper.

In 1951 Orville Allen, a former President of NY State Press Association, bought the Genesee Country Express. From 1951-1968 Allen was both the Publisher of the Express and the President of the NY State Press Organization. During his tenure as owner/publisher, Allen consolidated the Express with the Dansville Breeze, which had been founded in 1883. At that time, both papers continued to publish separate papers, but with shared mechanical and business operations. Allen also acquired the Wayland Register. In 1957, Allen's newspaper offices and printing facilities were damaged when a fire swept through the second floor of the building.

Orville Allen sold his papers in 1967. They were purchased by W.H. Greenhow Company, publisher of the Hornell Evening Tribune. W.H. Greenhow Co. was purchased by Freedom Newspapers Inc. of Santa Clara, California, in 1977.

== Notable coverage ==
George "Doc" Abraham began writing a column in the Genesee Country Express called The Green Thumb in 1947. The column gained popularity and was syndicated to 135 newspapers in the United States and Canada. Doc Abraham and his wife Katy won numerous awards for their contributions, including an award for being America's leading horticultural journalist in 1967.

== Awards ==
New York Press Association Award

Year	Award	Place	Recipient
1954	Best editorial page	1st	Genesee Country Express
1952	General Excellence (circ. 1,000-2,000)	1st	Genesee Country Express & Advertiser
1950	General Excellence	2nd	Genesee Country Express & Advertiser
	Best editorial	2nd	Genesee Country Express & Advertiser
	Best photography	2nd	Genesee Country Express & Advertiser
