= Oyster Bay Guardian =

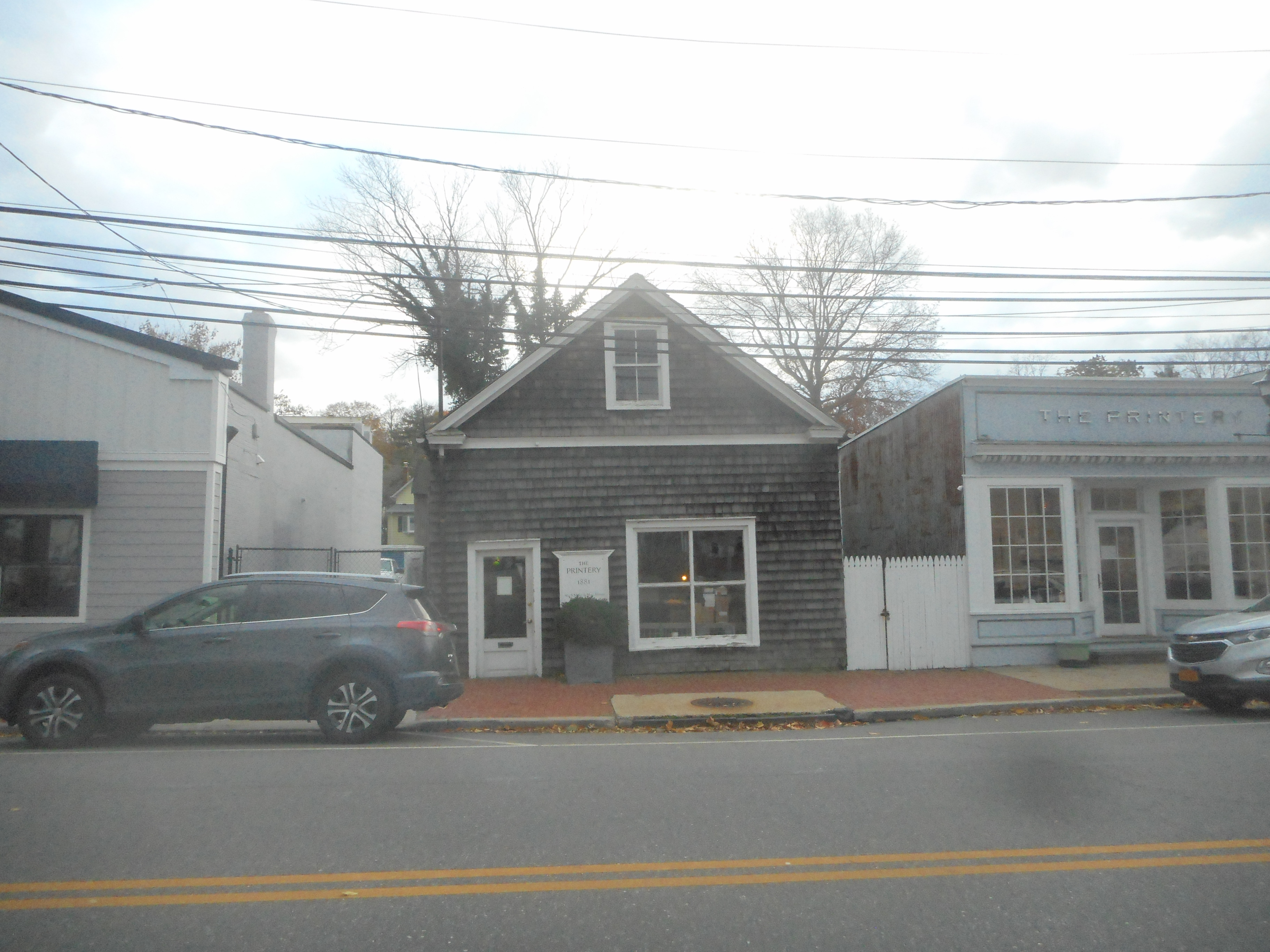
- The original home of the Guardian in November 2021

- Location within New York
- 40°52′19.68″N 73°31′56.89″W
- Location: 43 W Main St, Oyster Bay, New York, 2 Endo Blvd, Garden City

History
- Built: 1906

Oyster Bay Landmark
- Official name: The Printery
- Designated: March 10, 1987

The Oyster Bay Guardian is a weekly newspaper published in Oyster Bay, New York, since 1899. Back then, Nelson Disbrow began publishing this paper and also got a building to house his operations on West Main Street. While the newspaper has moved to another building, their building on West Main Street remains. Today, this building houses a commercial printing operation. The house is now a Town of Oyster Bay Landmark and a featured site on the Oyster Bay History Walk audio walking tour.

== History ==
The Printery, a brown shingled building, once housed the Oyster Bay Guardian, a weekly newspaper founded by Nelson Disbrow in 1899.

Disbrow had worked at several other New York newspapers, and first came to Oyster Bay in 1892 to work at the other local newspaper, The Oyster Bay Pilot. From 1899 to 1906 the Guardian had several homes, the first above a meat market on South Street and then in the Vail Building at 80 South Street. In 1905 the behavior of a rival newspaperman named Kennehan led the Disbrows to lose their lease in the Vail Building, and further pressure from their rival kept them from finding a rental anywhere in town.

Nelson bought his own property on West Main Street and in 1906 built the building, continuing to print the weekly paper as well as run his private printing business. After his death in 1928 his son Leslie Disbrow continued the Printery, expanding the Guardian to eight pages from the previous four. In 1967, the Disbrow family sold the newspaper to the newly formed Oyster Bay Publishing Company, a consortium of local women who elected Edwina Snow to the position of managing partner. The Disbrow family independently sold the Printery building to Elizabeth Schneider, who began her own endeavor as a private printer.

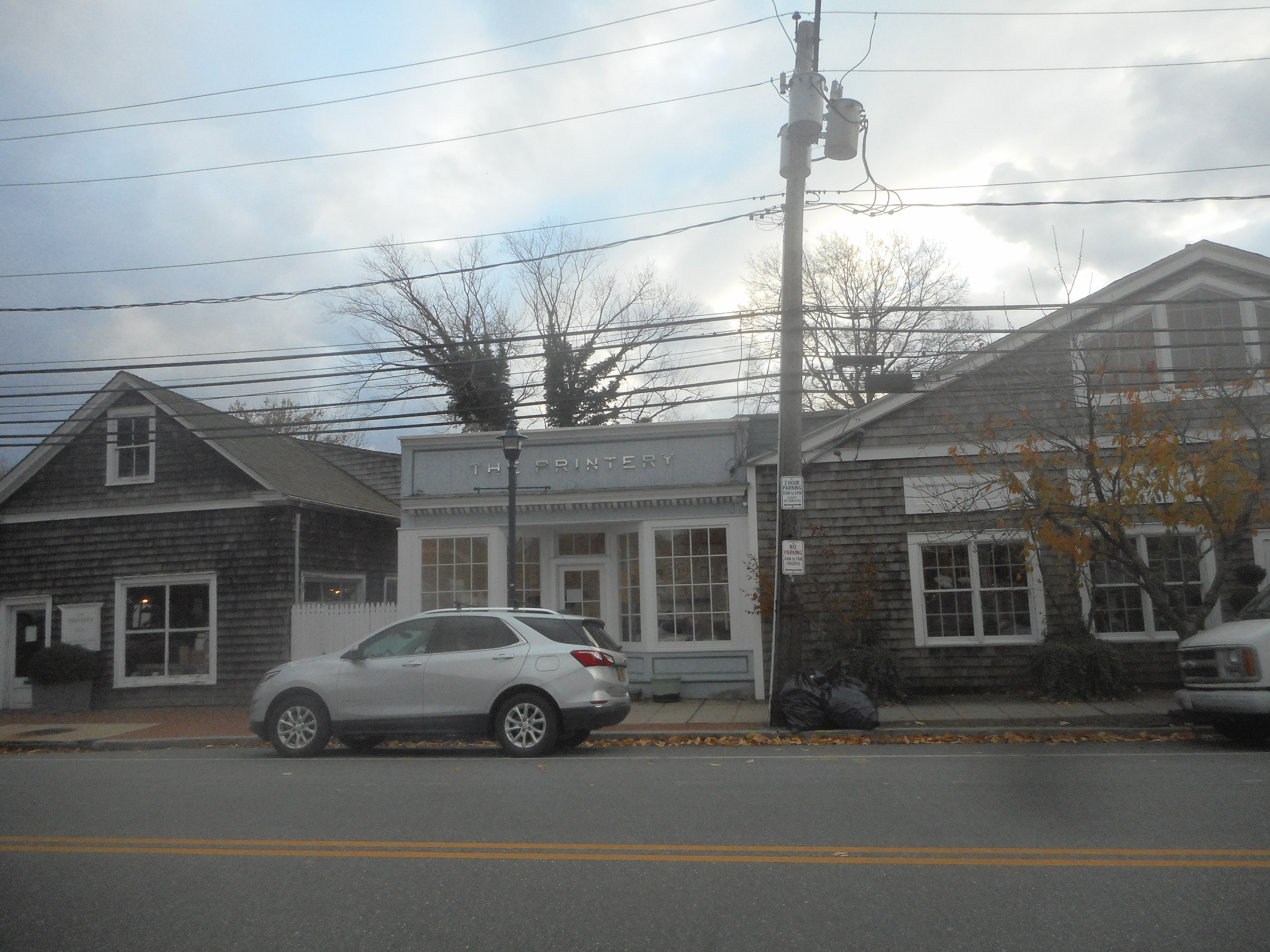
The current location of the Printery next door at 45 West Main Street.

The Guardian newspaper had also been located at 32 East Main Street, the former home of the grandparents of its Editor Emeritus Gloria O'Rourke who wrote a column called "Harbor Lights". In 1999, the Guardian celebrated 100 years of continuous publication as an independently owned newspaper. They continue to report the weekly comings and goings of life in Oyster Bay.

The Printery continues, under the ownership of William Miller and Mary Abbene, and their print shop.

In October 2010, the Oyster Bay Guardian was acquired by the publishing firm Richner Communications.

== See also ==
- Oyster Bay History Walk
- List of Town of Oyster Bay Landmarks
- National Register of Historic Places listings in Nassau County, New York
