= Articles by John Neal =

Articles written by John Neal (1793–1876) and published in periodicals

John Neal in 1856

Articles by American writer John Neal (1793–1876) influenced the development of American literature towards cultural independence and a unique style. They were published in newspapers, magazines, and literary journals and are part of the John Neal bibliography. They include his first known published work and pieces published in the last decade of his life. The topics of these works reflect the Neal's broad interests, including women's rights, feminism, gender, race, slavery, children, education, law, politics, art, architecture, literature, drama, religion, gymnastics, civics, American history, science, phrenology, travel, language, political economy, and temperance.

Neal was one of the leading critics of his time, demonstrating distrust of institutions and an affinity for self-examination and self-reliance. Compared to Neal's lesser success in creative works, literary historian Fred Lewis Pattee found that "his critical judgments have held. Where he condemned, time has almost without exception condemned also." Editors of newspapers, magazines, and annual publications sought contributions from Neal on a wide variety of topics, particularly in the second half of the 1830s. His early articles make him one of the first male advocates of women's rights and feminist causes in the United States.

Neal was the first American to be published in any British literary magazine and in that capacity wrote the first history of American literature and American painters. His early encouragement of writers John Greenleaf Whittier, Edgar Allan Poe, Henry Wadsworth Longfellow, Elizabeth Oakes Smith, Nathaniel Hawthorne, and many others, helped launch their careers. Neal was the first American art critic, and his essays from the 1820s were recognized as "prophetic" by art historian Harold E. Dickson. As an early and outspoken theater critic, he drafted a future for American drama that was only partially realized sixty years later.

== Articles ==
Articles by John Neal
Title	Date	Publication type	Publication name	Topic	Notes	Ref.
"Apostasy"	April 27, 1814	Newspaper	Hallowell Gazette	Law and politics	John Neal's first published work: a political essay published when Neal was living in Hallowell, Maine, as a penmanship instructor	
"Thoughts on Female Impropriety"	Between December 1815 and June 1816	Newspaper	The Wanderer	Unknown	Originally prepared for recitation at the all-female Wanderer Club of Baltimore; published in volume I, pp. 165–168	
"Criticism. Lord Byron"	October 1816, November 1816, December 1816, and January 1817	Magazine	The Portico	Literary criticism	A 150-page criticism of Lord Byron's works written in four days and published in four installments; Neal's first published literary criticism	
"Airs of Palestine, a Poem; By John Pierpont, Esq"	December 1816	Magazine	The Port Folio	Literary criticism	A review of The Airs of Palestine by John Pierpont	
"The Life and Studies of Benjamin West, Esq. By John Galt. Philadelphia. 1816"	January 1817	Magazine	The Portico	Literary criticism	A recommendation of John Galt's biography of painter Benjamin West	
"Crystalina, a Fairy Tale, by an American. New York. 1816"	January 1817	Magazine	The Portico	Literary criticism	A criticism of the poem Crystallina; a Fairy Tale, in Six Cantos by John Milton Harney, identifying what he saw as faults, possible inspirations, and evidence it is "one of the most splendid productions of the age."	
"Essay on Duelling"	February 1817	Magazine	The Portico	Social criticism	"Describes dueling as a gendered performance, in which women play an enabling role and which they have an obligation to stop," similar to his subsequent novel, Keep Cool	
"The Village, a Poem ... Portland ... 1816"	March 1817	Magazine	The Portico	Literary criticism	Qualified praise for the poem "The Village" by Neal's friend and later Maine governor Enoch Lincoln; includes an attempted definition of poetry and dismisses the expectation of including prose notes with poetry as an unnecessary British precedent	
"Childe Harold's Pilgrimmage, Canto third. With other Poems. By Lord Byron ... 1817"	March 1817	Magazine	The Portico	Literary criticism	A criticism of Childe Harold's Pilgrimage	
"Remarks Addressed to the Author of the Essay on Genius and Passion in the last Number of the Portico"	March 1817	Magazine	The Portico	Literature	A reaction to an article by Stephen Simpson in the preceding issue; debates the distinction between passion and genius	
"Reply to the Essay entitled 'Genius the Soul of Passion.' Addressed to 'S.'"	May 1817	Magazine	The Portico	Literature	A reaction to an article by Stephen Simpson in the preceding issue, itself being a reaction to Simpson's original article in the February issue; debates the distinction between passion and genius	
"Reply to 'a Lounger,' on the subject of Duelling	May 1817	Magazine	The Portico	Social criticism	A reaction to an article in the preceding issue that reacted to Neal's "Essay on Duelling" in February; asserts the immorality of duels	
"'Bertram; a Tragedy' and 'Manuel; a Tragedy'—by the Rev. R. C. Maturin"	June 1817	Magazine	The Portico	Literary criticism	A criticism of Charles Robert Maturin's plays Bertram and Manuel that "grossly over-estimates" their value; makes clear Maturin's influence on Neal's first dramatic work, Otho	
"Criticism"	August 16, 1817	Newspaper	Columbian Centinel	Literary criticism	A criticism of William Shakespeare	
"Criticism: Manfred, A Dramatick Poem, by Lord Byron"	September–October 1817	Magazine	The Portico	Literary criticism	A criticism of Lord Byron's Manfred that points out absurdities in the poem but overall offers high praise	
"Remarks on Anster Fair"	December 1817	Magazine	The Portico	Literary criticism	A kind assessment of the poem Anster Fair by William Tennant, dubbing it "one of the most finished poems in our language"	
"Tales of my Landlord"	December 1817	Magazine	The Portico	Literary criticism	Praise for the characterization in the novel series Tales of My Landlord by Walter Scott in an overall poor review dubbing the works as "overburdened with a wearisome load of laboured trash"	
"Boswell and Johnson"	January–March 1818	Magazine	The Portico	Literary criticism	A critique of The Life of Samuel Johnson by James Boswell originally read by Neal before the Delphian Club April 26, 1817; republished in the Portland Tribune circa 1841; republished as "Boswell and Johnson—a Critique" in Emerson's United States Magazine November 1856	
"Criticism. Demetrius, a Russian Romance. Baltimore"	April–June 1818	Magazine	The Portico	Literary criticism	A dismissal of the anonymous novel Demetrius, a Russian Romance for "studied unnaturalness"	
"Demetrius, the Hero of the Don. An epick poem, by Alexis Eustaphieve. Boston"	April–June 1818	Magazine	The Portico	Literary criticism	A dismissal of Demetrius, the Hero of the Don, An Epick Poem by Alexis Eustaphieve for poor diction and verse structure	
"What is the Chief Excellence of Shakespeare?"	April–June 1818	Magazine	The Portico	Literary criticism	Refutes the significance of Shakespeare's character delineation and asserts the significance of the playwright's "simplicity and artlessness"; read at the Delphian Club June 20, 1818	
"Childe Harold's Pilgrimage. Canto IV by Lord Byron. Philadelphia, published by M. Thomas"	April–June 1818	Magazine	The Portico	Literary criticism	A criticism of the fourth canto of Childe Harold's Pilgrimage	
"Man not a Free Agent"	April–June 1818	Magazine	The Portico	Religion	A refutation of the philosophy of Thomas Reid; contends that God's foreknowledge of the future renders humans not accountable for sin; recanted in Wandering Recollections of a Somewhat Busy Life	
"Byron, Moore and Hunt"	September 19, 1818	Magazine	The Journal of the Times	Literary criticism	"Distinctly over-estimates Hunt, is pretty severe on Moore, and makes the mistake of pronouncing Byron a dramatist"	
"American Character"	September 26, October 3, October 17, and October 24, 1818	Magazine	The Journal of the Times	Regionalism and nationalism	Calls for recognition of US national character distinct from the UK, arguing that as a young nation, the US is more connected to its origins than older nations; calls for support of American literature; in four installments	
"Junius Not Identified"	January 16, January 30, February 6, February 13, February 20, and February 27, 1819	Magazine	The Journal of the Times	Literary criticism	Alleges that John Taylor's identification of Junius as Sir Philip Francis is false, but offers no theory as to the identity of Junius; originally delivered as a 100-minute address before the Delphian Club witnessed only by Paul Allen and Tobias Watkins; published in seven installments	
Review of The Backwoodsman	February 23 and 24, 1819	Newspaper	Federal Republican and Baltimore Telegraph	Literary criticism	Unfavorable review of the poem The Backwoodsman by James Kirke Paulding; published over two issues	
"Unanimity"	February 25, 1819	Newspaper	Federal Republican and Baltimore Telegraph	Law and politics	Expresses favor for the Federalist Party	
Sturges v. Crowninshield articles	February 26, February 27, March 2, March 4, April 1, April 2, and April 3, 1819	Newspaper	Federal Republican and Baltimore Telegraph	Law and politics	A series of articles criticizing Chief Justice John Marshall's opinion in Sturges v. Crowninshield and advocating national bankruptcy laws	
Letter signed "Eleanor"	March 3, 1819	Newspaper	Federal Republican and Baltimore Telegraph	English language	Remarks on pronunciation and good use of English	
Review of Hoffman's Course of Legal Study	March 6, 8, and 10, 1819	Newspaper	Federal Republican and Baltimore Telegraph	Law and politics	A recommendation of David Hoffman's Course of Legal Study, detailing how Neal used it as a guide for reading law; published in three installments	
"The Moralist"	March 6, March 13, March 20, April 3, and April 9, 1819	Newspaper	Federal Republican and Baltimore Telegraph	Children and education	A series of five articles offering advice for parents of children and Neal's early feminist views; part of a discourse with articles by "The Friend of Reflection" in the same paper in the same period	
"The Fine Arts"	March 10, 1819	Newspaper	Federal Republican and Baltimore Telegraph	Art criticism	Poor review of an engraving of the signing of the US Declaration of Independence; prompted a multi-issue printed debate between Neal and a writer under the pseudonym "Print-Seller"	
Review of review	March 10, 1819	Newspaper	Federal Republican and Baltimore Telegraph	Literary criticism	A review of a review in the Analectic Magazine of Sacred Songs by Thomas Moore and The Airs of Palestine by John Pierpont	
"Spanish-Italian-French"	March 11, 1819	Newspaper	Federal Republican and Baltimore Telegraph	English language	Remarks on pronunciation and good use of English	
"The Federalist"	March 12 – April 13, 1819	Newspaper	Federal Republican and Baltimore Telegraph	Law and politics	Advocates the Federalist Party, questions Andrew Jackson's justification of the Seminole Wars; published in eight installments	
Review of Wood	March 16, 1819	Newspaper	Federal Republican and Baltimore Telegraph	Art criticism	Praise for local Baltimore portrait painter named Wood	
Review of The Passage of the Delaware	March 16, 1819	Newspaper	Federal Republican and Baltimore Telegraph	Art criticism	A critique of Thomas Sully's painting The Passage of the Delaware	
"Walker's Pronunciation"	March 17, 1819	Newspaper	Federal Republican and Baltimore Telegraph	English language	Remarks on pronunciation and good use of English	
"Battle of Waterloo"	March 20, 1819	Newspaper	Federal Republican and Baltimore Telegraph	Art criticism	One of Neal's earliest published art critiques	
"To the Friend of Reflection"	March 20, 1819	Newspaper	Federal Republican and Baltimore Telegraph	Feminism and women's rights	An exploration of the intellectual capacities of, and differences between, men and women	
"American Perseverance"	March 24, 1819	Newspaper	Federal Republican and Baltimore Telegraph	Regionalism and nationalism	Displays "militant Americanism"	
"Airs of Palestine"	March 25, 1819	Newspaper	Federal Republican and Baltimore Telegraph	Literary criticism	A review of The Airs of Palestine by John Pierpont	
Review of Brutus	April 10, 1819	Newspaper	Federal Republican and Baltimore Telegraph	Theatrical criticism	Critique of the play Brutus by John Howard Payne, exploring Payne's influences	
Review of Florence Macarthy	April 14, 1819	Newspaper	Federal Republican and Baltimore Telegraph	Literary criticism	Praises Florence Macarthy by Lady Morgan as "remarkably well written," but not one of the author's best novels	
"Plagiarism — Poets"	April 16, 1819	Newspaper	Federal Republican and Baltimore Telegraph	Literature	An exploration of what is and isn't original in poetry given similarities between contemporary poets' work and their predecessors	
"Pickering's Vocabulary"	April 21, 1819	Newspaper	Federal Republican and Baltimore Telegraph	English language	Remarks on pronunciation and good use of English	
"American Character"	April 22, 1819	Newspaper	Federal Republican and Baltimore Telegraph	Regionalism and nationalism	Displays "militant Americanism"	
"Baltimore — Publick Buildings"	April 23, 1819	Newspaper	Federal Republican and Baltimore Telegraph	Art criticism	Architectural criticism of Baltimore's public buildings, with comparison to those of Philadelphia, New York City, and Boston; condemns the use of false fronts and the Massachusetts State House for "a most savage style of disproportion and deformity"	
"Battle Monument"	June 12, 1819	Newspaper	Federal Republican and Baltimore Telegraph	Art criticism	Praise for the design of Baltimore's Washington Monument for "grand simplicity, without ornament or frippery" and for Baltimore's Battle Monument for its "elegance of design"; continued in the June 19 issue as a letter from "an American"	
"Citizen No. II"	June 23 and 29, 1819	Newspaper	Federal Republican and Baltimore Telegraph	Law and politics	Argues against the constitutionality of state banks issuing banknotes a decade before the argument was made by Albert Gallatin; published in two installments	
"Mazeppa"	August 27, 1819	Newspaper	New England Galaxy	Literary criticism	A criticism of Mazeppa by Lord Byron, pronouncing it a forgery	
"Don Juan"	October 16, 1819	Newspaper	New England Galaxy	Literary criticism	A criticism of Don Juan by Lord Byron, pronouncing it a forgery	
"American Painters and Painting"	February 19, 1820	Newspaper	Federal Republican and Baltimore Telegraph	Art criticism	Displays "militant Americanism" in review of American artists	
Review of Ivanhoe	March 4, 1820	Newspaper	Federal Republican and Baltimore Telegraph	Literary criticism	Criticism of Ivanhoe by Walter Scott as formulaic; republished in the New England Galaxy (March 17, 1820)	
"Fanny, a Poem. By Croaker"	June 9, 1820	Newspaper	New England Galaxy	Literary criticism	A criticism of the poem Fanny by Fitz-Greene Halleck, denouncing it as an inferior imitation of Lord Byron's Don Juan, but pronouncing of the author "as an original and a genius, he might be of the first class"	
"Something New"	February 18, 1820	Newspaper	Federal Republican and Baltimore Telegraph	Literary criticism	Praise for James Kirke Paulding's Salmagundi	
Review of Sully	March 17, 1820	Newspaper	Federal Republican and Baltimore Telegraph	Art criticism	Praise for painter Thomas Sully	
Review of The Lay of a Maniac Harper, Sung over the Grave of his Mistress	August 4, 1820	Newspaper	Federal Republican and Baltimore Telegraph	Literary criticism	Critique of the poem The Lay of a Maniac Harper, Sung over the Grave of his Mistress by Grenville Mellen; praises the work as a whole but condemns something in every line	
Review of Rembrandt Peale	September 8, 1820	Newspaper	Morning Chronicle	Art criticism	Praise for painter Rembrandt Peale	
"Dr. Hoyden's Geological Essays"	November 18, 1820	Newspaper	Federal Gazette and Baltimore Daily Advertiser	Science	Praise for Geological Essays by Horace H. Hayden	
Review of Judith, Esther, and Other Poems	December 15 and 22, 1820	Newspaper	New England Galaxy	Literary criticism	Praise for the collection Judith, Esther, and Other Poems by Maria Gowen Brooks	
Review of Song, Composed for the Anniversary of the Landing of our Fathers	March 17, 1821	Newspaper	Federal Republican and Baltimore Telegraph	Literary criticism	Critique of the poem Song, Composed for the Anniversary of the Landing of our Fathers by Grenville Mellen rejecting a review of the work in the New England Galaxy	
"Reubens' Picture"	April 2, 1821	Newspaper	Federal Republican and Baltimore Telegraph	Art criticism	A review of the painting Rubens Peale with a Geranium by Rembrandt Peale	
Review of Rembrandt Peale	April 7, 1821	Newspaper	Morning Chronicle	Art criticism	Praise for painter Rembrandt Peale	
"Sukey"	April 27, 1821	Newspaper	New England Galaxy	Literary criticism	A criticism of the poem Sukey by William Bicker Walter, denouncing it as an imitation of Fanny by Fitz-Greene Halleck, but pronouncing that "the poet is an honour to his country"	
Review of Kean	May 11, 1821	Newspaper	New England Galaxy	Theatrical criticism	Criticism of actor Edmund Kean; Neal was "heartily tired of him" and his "violent transition, stage trick, and exaggeration"	
"Progress of the Fine Arts"	October 10, 1821	Newspaper	Morning Chronicle	Art criticism	One of Neal's earliest published articles on art	
"Noah"	October 19, 1821	Newspaper	New England Galaxy	Literary criticism	A criticism of the poem Noah by Paul Allen, describing it as tame, but best in parts where it is least tame	
Review of Rembrandt Peale	December 25, 1821	Newspaper	Morning Chronicle	Art criticism	Praise for painter Rembrandt Peale	
"Mr. Pelby's Hamlet"	July 6, 1822	Newspaper	Baltimore Patriot and Mercantile Advertiser	Theatrical criticism	Praise for English actor William Pelby based on his performance in Baltimore, summer 1822	
"Fine Arts"	October 9, 1822	Newspaper	Morning Chronicle	Art criticism	One of Neal's earliest published articles on art	
"Review of the First Annual Exhibition at Baltimore"	October 14, 16, 17, 18, 19, 22, 23, 24, 25, 26, 27, 28, 29, 30, and 31, 1822	Newspaper	Morning Chronicle, Federal Republican and Baltimore Telegraph, and American and Commercial Daily Advertiser	Art criticism	Critiques every piece (approximately 200) at a Peale Museum exhibition, including works by Sarah Miriam Peale, Thomas Sully, Gilbert Stuart, and Chester Harding; "the most pretentious" of Neal's Baltimore newspaper art criticism; first three installments in the Morning Chronicle, fourth in the Federal Republican and Baltimore Telegraph, and the fifth through fifteenth in the American and Commercial Daily Advertiser	
Review of Booth	October 23, 1822	Newspaper	American and Commercial Daily Advertiser	Theatrical criticism	Praise for actor Junius Brutus Booth, with comparisons to Edmund Kean	
Review of Quentin Durward	June 25, 1823	Newspaper	Columbian Observer	Literary criticism	A lukewarm review of Quentin Durward by Sir Walter Scott, declaring it inferior to Guy Mannering and Ivanhoe	
Letter to John Elihu Hall	August 15, 1823	Newspaper	Columbian Observer	Literary criticism	An attack on John Elihu Hall's review of Logan and Seventy-Six in The Port Folio (August 1823)	
"Second Exhibition of Paintings at the Museum"	October 30 – November 24, 1823	Newspaper	Federal Gazette and Baltimore Daily Advertiser	Art criticism	Published anonymously in seven installments and signed "Remarks of an Old Brush"; "an extraordinary-for-its-day" description of the role of art critics in society and individual critiques of 253 works by 47 artists at the Peale Museum, including Sarah Miriam Peale	
"Sketches of the Five American Presidents, and of the Five Presidential Candidates, from the Memoranda of a Traveller"	May 1824	Magazine	Blackwood's Edinburgh Magazine	Biography	Biographical sketches of George Washington, John Adams, Thomas Jefferson, James Madison, James Monroe, John C. Calhoun, John Quincy Adams, Andrew Jackson, William H. Crawford, and Henry Clay; the first article by an American to appear in a British literary journal; republished by Alexander Walker in The European Review: or, Mind and its Productions, in Britain, France, Italy, Germany, &c. the same year	
"Speculations of a Traveller, concerning the People of North America and Great Britain"	June 1824	Magazine	Blackwood's Edinburgh Magazine	Regionalism and nationalism	Contrasts the governments of the US and UK with the intent to foster curiosity about the US among Britons	
"American Character"	June 1824	Magazine	The European Review: or, Mind and its Productions, in Britain, France, Italy, Germany, &c.	Social criticism	Responds to the argument that diversity in race, language, and culture erodes American national character by showing how the opposite has eroded national character in European nations	
"Speculations of a Traveller concerning the People of the United States; with Parallels"	July 1824	Magazine	Blackwood's Edinburgh Magazine	Regionalism and nationalism	Contrasts the social characteristics of people from England, Ireland, Scotland, New England, Virginia, and Kentucky	
"North America. Peculiarities. State of the Fine Arts. Painting."	August 1824	Magazine	Blackwood's Edinburgh Magazine	Art criticism	The first published history of American painting; excerpted in Observations on American Art: Selections from the Writings of John Neal (1793–1876) (1943); a critique of cultivation of fine arts in the US and a discussion of eleven American artists, including Benjamin West and John Trumbull; republished in the Columbian Observer (multiple issues beginning November 17, 1824)	
American Writers	September 1824, October 1824, November 1824, January 1825, February 1825	Magazine	Blackwood's Edinburgh Magazine	Literary criticism	Criticism of 135 American authors in five installments; the earliest written history of American literature; reprinted as a collection in American Writers: A Series of Papers Contributed to Blackwood's Magazine (1824–1825) (1937); excerpted in The Genius of John Neal: Selections from His Writings (1978)	
"Men and Women; Brief Hypothesis concerning the Difference in their Genius"	October 1824	Magazine	Blackwood's Edinburgh Magazine	Feminism and women's rights	An exploration of how women are unlike, but not inferior to, men	
"A Summary View of America"	December 1824	Magazine	Blackwood's Edinburgh Magazine	Multiple	Purportedly a review of A Summary View of America by Isaac Candler "literally buried beneath the grasping tendrils and riotous fruitage of Neal's birthright knowledge of his native country" in a "vast panorama" conveying Neal's views on slavery and other topics in thirty-six pages that "should be read by anyone interested in the America of 1825"; the longest article Blackwood's had yet published; includes Neal's first call for women's suffrage	
"M. Godefroy"	April 1825	Magazine	Blackwood's Edinburgh Magazine	Biography	A defense of the works and character of Maximilian Godefroy, possibly prompted by Neal's own guilt for a derogatory reference in "A Summary View of America"	
"Celebration of the Landing of the Pilgrim Fathers in America"	July–September 1825	Magazine	The Oriental Herald, and Journal of General Literature	Regionalism and nationalism	A history of early British American colonization leading up to the Plymouth Colony and an account of the recent celebration of the anniversary of that colony's founding; written under an assumed English identity	
"Late American Books. 1. Peep at the Pilgrims; 2. Lionel Lincoln; 3. Memoirs of Charles Brockden Brown; 4. John Bull in America; 5. The Refugee; 6. North American Review, No. XLVI"	September 1825	Magazine	Blackwood's Edinburgh Magazine	Literary criticism	A review of North American Review and new American literature including Lionel Lincoln; predicts a new American revolution against "literary, not political bondage"; republished in American Writers: A Series of Papers Contributed to Blackwood's Magazine (1824–1825) (1937); excerpted in The Genius of John Neal: Selections from His Writings (1978)	
"North American Politics. By a Genuine Yankee. Probable Separation of the States; Causes — considered in detail. Georgia Resolutions, &c. &c. &c."	September 1825	Magazine	Blackwood's Edinburgh Magazine	Law and politics	Neal's final contribution to Blackwood's; reveals that he is American and not British without revealing his name but for signing it "N."; reveals his intent in previous articles of this publication to attract British attention to the US; declares the slavery issue as capable of separating the states	
"Observations on the Present State of Literature in the North American Republick"	September and October 1825	Magazine	The European Magazine and London Review	Regionalism and nationalism	Published in two installments; discussion of the impediments to the US developing a distinct literature and in what ways they have already been overcome or not	
"Sketches of American Character. British Authorities Examined. Mr. Mathews' Trip to America. By an American"	December 1825	Magazine	The European Magazine and London Review	Theatrical criticism	An attack on theatrical representations of Yankee character by Charles Mathews	
"United States"	January 1826	Magazine	Westminster Review	Social criticism	A summary of Neal's views on the American militia system, slavery, legal system, and literary style	
"Letters from the United States of North America No. I. Habits of the People — Inconsistency — Scraps of their Speech — Master and Servant — Helps — Emigrants — Tricks in Trade"	January 1826	Magazine	The Monthly Magazine, or British Register of Literature, Sciences, and Belles Lettres	Social criticism	One of a seven-part series of essays written from the perspective of an observer in America to a British reader; highlights inconsistencies in American behavior regarding slavery, democracy, social hierarchy, and trade	
"Reply to Mr. Mathews. By a Native Yankee"	February 1826	Magazine	The European Magazine and London Review	Regionalism and nationalism	A reply to Charles Mathews's response to "Sketches of American Character. British Authorities Examined. Mr. Mathews' Trip to America. By an American" (December 1825)	
"Letters from the United States of North America No. II"	March 1826	Magazine	The Monthly Magazine, or British Register of Literature, Sciences, and Belles Lettres	Social criticism	One of a seven-part series of essays written from the perspective of an observer in America to a British reader; focused on Boston's value as a city	
"Lecture on Verbicide — By a Man of the Law"	April 1826	Magazine	The Monthly Magazine, or British Register of Literature, Sciences, and Belles Lettres	English language	Possibly originally prepared for presentation at the Delphian Club circa 1816–1820; a humorous examination of pun use	
"Yankee Notions"	April, May, and June 1826	Magazine	The London Magazine	Travel	An account of Neal's departure from Baltimore, transatlantic journey, early impressions of England from late 1823 through early 1824, and contrasts between the UK and US; the most detailed account of Neal's reasons for leaving Baltimore and for relocating to London; published in three installments	
"Letters from the United States of North America No. III"	May 1826	Magazine	The Monthly Magazine, or British Register of Literature, Sciences, and Belles Lettres	Multiple	One of a seven-part series of essays written from the perspective of an observer in America to a British reader; "More rambling than the first two" essays in this series; praises the American Journal of Education and new American interest in education, particularly physical education; calls for measures to protect American authors from British competition; describes holiday traditions in the US with focus on Independence Day	
"The Last American Novel"	May 1826	Magazine	The London Magazine	Literary criticism	Sharp criticism of The Last of the Mohicans by James Fenimore Cooper	
"Gymnastic Exercises in London"	June 1826	Magazine	American Journal of Education	Gymnastics	A report of Carl Voelker's work with gymnastics in London	
"Professor Voelker's Gymnasium, London"	July 1826	Magazine	American Journal of Education	Gymnastics	A report of Carl Voelker's work with gymnastics in London	
"Letters from the United States of North America No. IV. Painters — Painting"	July 1826	Magazine	The Monthly Magazine, or British Register of Literature, Sciences, and Belles Lettres	Art criticism	Part of a seven-part series of essays written from the perspective of an observer in America to a British reader; continued in "Letters from the United States of North America No. V. Painters — Painting" (August 1826); asserts a good writer makes a better art critic than a painter; "a thorough, if unsystematic review" in parts IV and V of American painters John Singleton Copley, Benjamin West, Gilbert Stuart, John Trumbull, Washington Allston, Thomas Sully, John Wesley Jarvis, the Peale family (Charles Willson Peale, Titian Ramsay Peale I, Titian Ramsay Peale II, Raphaelle Peale, Rembrandt Peale, Harriet Cany Peale, Rosalba Carriera Peale, Rubens Peale, James Peale, Maria Peale, Anna Claypoole Peale, Margaretta Angelica Peale, Sarah Miriam Peale), Charles Robert Leslie, Gilbert Stuart Newton, John Vanderlyn, Samuel Morse, Robert Matthew Sully, William Edward West, Chester Harding, James Bowman, and others, that continued through the next essay in the series	
"Mr. John Dunn Hunter; The Hero of Hunter's Activity Among The Indians, &c."	July 1826	Magazine	The London Magazine	Biography	Attacks the authenticity of John Dunn Hunter's published narratives of living among American Indians	
"The Character of the Real Yankees; What They are Supposed to Be, and What They Are"	September 1826	Magazine	The New Monthly Magazine and Literary Journal	Regionalism and nationalism	What Neal considers the defining characteristics of New England Yankees, compared to how Yankees are viewed by other Americans, by Europeans, and themselves; originally written as the introductory chapter of Brother Jonathan (1825); republished in the Portland Tribune circa 1841	
"Letters from the United States of North America No. VI. General View of Education There"	October 1826	Magazine	The Monthly Magazine, or British Register of Literature, Sciences, and Belles Lettres	Multiple	One of a seven-part series of essays written from the perspective of an observer in America to a British reader; discusses treatment of Black Americans by Whites in northern and southern states; focuses on American schools; includes notice of the anticipated first edition of Webster's Dictionary	
"Bull in America; or, the New Munchausen"	October–December 1826	Magazine	The Oriental Herald, and Journal of General Literature	Literary criticism	Criticizes James Kirke Paulding's John Bull in America as a misrepresentation of the US	
"Teachers of Gymnastics"	November 1826	Magazine	American Journal of Education	Gymnastics	A report of Carl Voelker's work with gymnastics in London	
"Letters from the United States of North America No. VII. British Travellers in America"	December 1826	Magazine	The Monthly Magazine, or British Register of Literature, Sciences, and Belles Lettres	Regionalism and nationalism	One of a seven-part series of essays written from the perspective of an observer in America to a British reader; responds to misrepresentations of America by British authors	
"Gymnastics Schools in England"	January 1827	Magazine	American Journal of Education	Gymnastics	A report of Carl Voelker's work with gymnastics in London	
Language learning articles	1828–1829	Magazine	The Yankee	Children and education	A series of six articles exploring methods for learning new languages, including the Hamiltonian system, among others; focused on romance languages	
Northeast border articles	1828–1829	Magazine	The Yankee	Law and politics	A series of eight articles exploring the Maine border dispute that precipitated the Aroostook War	
Temperance articles	1828–1829	Magazine	The Yankee	Temperance	A series of eleven articles condemning the negative impacts of the New England rum industry and promoting caution in the consumption of alcohol	
Gymnastics articles	1828–1829	Magazine	The Yankee	Gymnastics	A series of twenty-three articles documenting the growth of gymnastics in Portland, Maine and elsewhere	
"England, a General View of Society There"	January 1, 9, January 23, February 6, February 20, and March 5, 1828	Magazine	The Yankee	Travel	Reviews literature, art, and character of the people in England, based on Neal's travels 1824–1827; published in six installments	
"Mrs. Sarah J. Hale"	January 16, 1828	Magazine	The Yankee	Feminism and women's rights	Praises Ladies' Magazine editor Sarah Josepha Hale; calls for more female editors and greater opportunities for female economic independence	
"More Portland Poetry"	January 23, 1828	Magazine	The Yankee	Literary criticism	Criticism of poets from Portland, Maine	
Lottery articles	January 23, January 30, February 6, February 13, March 3, March 26, April 16, April 30, June 11, June 18, June 25, July 2, August 13, September 10, November 26, and December 10, 1828	Magazine	The Yankee	Social criticism	A "vigorous campaign" of seventeen articles (two in the June 25 issue) denouncing lotteries as encouraging idle and reckless behavior	
"Ourself"	February 6, 1828	Magazine	The Yankee	Regionalism and nationalism	A vindication of Neal's work in London for British literary journals as a patriotic undertaking	
Utilitarianism articles	February 16, February 23, March 12, March 19, May 28, June 25, and October 15, 1828	Magazine	The Yankee	Social criticism	A series of articles on Jeremy Bentham-inspired utilitarianism in seven installments; February 23 includes an excerpt from The Principles of Moral and Political Philosophy by William Paley	
"New England As It Was"	March–November 1828	Magazine	The Yankee	Regionalism and nationalism	A multipart essay exploring New England customs, traditions, and speech; published in tandem with "New England As It Is"; attributed to "A Yankee"	
"New England As It Is"	March–November 1828	Magazine	The Yankee	Regionalism and nationalism	A multipart essay exploring New England customs, traditions, and speech; published in tandem with "New England As It Was"; attributed to "A Yankee"	
"Live Yankees"	March 5, April 23, May 14, May 28, and June 11, 1828	Magazine	The Yankee	Regionalism and nationalism	A five-part essay exploring the defining characteristics of Yankee New Englanders; republished in the Portland Tribune circa 1841	
"The Men of England"	March 19, April 2, April 16, April 30, and May 14, 1828	Magazine	The Yankee	Travel	Reviews the character of the male citizens of England, based on Neal's travels 1824–1827; published in five installments	
Portland sidewalk articles	March 12, April 16, September 3, and September 17, 1828	Magazine	The Yankee	Law and politics	A series of four articles advocating the construction of Portland, Maine's first sidewalks.	
"Portland Mechanics"	March 19, 1828	Magazine	The Yankee	Social criticism	A notice of the Maine Charitable Mechanic Association; republished in the Portland Tribune circa 1841	
"Woman"	March 26, 1828	Magazine	The Yankee	Feminism and women's rights	Calls for greater opportunities for female economic independence	
"England — By a Yankee"	June 4, June 18, July 2, July 16, July 30, August 13, and August 27, 1828	Magazine	The Yankee	Feminism and women's rights	Musings on differences between men and women, educational and economic opportunities for women in England compared to the US, ideals of beauty, female morality, marriage, and relationship between men and women in England; published in seven installments	
"English Eloquence, Oratory, and Newspapers"	August 1828 – June 1829	Magazine	The Yankee	Travel	Reviews the manners of communication in England, based on Neal's travels 1824–1827; published in twelve installments	
"Jokology"	November 12, 1828	Magazine	The Yankee	Multiple	Originally prepared as a speech for the Delphian Club circa 1816–1820; similar to "Lecture on Verbicide — By a Man of the Law" in The Monthly Magazine, or British Register of Literature, Sciences, and Belles Lettres (April 1826)	
"Natural Writing"	November 26, 1828	Magazine	The Yankee	English language	A treatise on natural diction in writing	
"Editorial Comforts"	January 1829	Magazine	The Yankee	Social criticism	Complains of mistreatment by others in the literary world but promises subscribers that future issues of The Yankee will show a reduction in personal grievances by Neal; includes positive comments by Mathew Carey	
"To Correspondents"	January 1, 1829	Magazine	The Yankee	Feminism and women's rights	Attacks social prejudice against unmarried women	
"DOMESTIC DUTIES (from the 32nd London Edition of Mrs. William Parkes.) J. & J. HARPER. New York"	January 8, 1829	Magazine	The Yankee	Literary criticism	A favorable review of Domestic Duties by Mrs. William Parkes	
"Sectarian Discourses"	February–April 1829	Magazine	The Yankee	Religion	A discussion of sermons by Christian leaders of various sects, including Universalists, Unitarians, Baptists, and Trinitarians	
"Rights of Women. Review of the Mayor's Report — so far as it relates to the High School for Girls. By E. BAILEY, late Master of that School. Boston. BOWLES & DEARBORN"	March 5, 1829	Magazine	The Yankee	Feminism and women's rights	Denounces "with considerable heat" Josiah Quincy III's decision to close the Boston High School for Girls and attacks the legal institution of coverture; includes "Neal's angriest and most assertive feminist claims"	
Review of The Wife	March 5, 1829	Magazine	The Yankee	Feminism and women's rights	A scathing review of The Wife book in the Tales of Woman series for its dismissal of women's potential; calls for political rights for women	
"Tactique des Assemblées Législatives"	March 26, 1829	Magazine	The Yankee	Law and politics	A summary of Tactique des Assemblées Législatives by Jeremy Bentham on the advantages of government by a single legislative body	
"Penitentiary System"	April 9, April 23, May 14, June 11, June 18, and June 25, 1829	Magazine	The Yankee	Law and politics	An exploration of prison systems; inspired by a Mathew Carey essay and by Jeremy Bentham's concept of a panopticon; published in six installments	
"Capacities of Women"	April 30, 1829	Magazine	The Yankee	Feminism and women's rights	In the form of a letter and attached editorial comment demonstrating and declaring that "women are not inferior to men; but they are unlike men. They cannot do all that men may do — any more than men may do all that women may do"	
"New Works"	May 21, 1829	Magazine	The Yankee	Literary criticism	Praise for the new literary periodical, The Original, edited by Frances Harriet Whipple Green McDougall; calls for greater encouragement of "she-magazines"	
"American Painters and Painting"	July 1829	Magazine	The Yankee	Art criticism	Criticism of the current state of American art written "with a pungency rare in nineteenth century criticism"; republished in American Art 1700–1960 (1965)	
"The Drama"	July, September, October, November, and December 1829	Magazine	The Yankee	Theatrical criticism	Published in five installments; Neal's most noteworthy work of theatrical criticism; calls for "a revolution that was still in progress sixty years later"; elaborates on points made in the prefaces to Otho (1819) and the second edition of The Battle of Niagara (1819); republished in "Critical Essays and Stories by John Neal" (1962)	
"English Scenery—Villages: Leamington, Warwick's Castle, Kenilworth"	September 1829	Magazine	The Yankee	Travel	A treatise on English scenery and villages based on his travels 1824–1827	
"Trip to Paris by a New-Englander"	September 1829	Magazine	The Yankee	Travel	A treatise on Paris based on Neal's travels in 1827	
"If E.A.P. of Baltimore"	September 1829	Magazine	The Yankee	Literary criticism	Neal's first criticism of Edgar Allan Poe	
"Landscape and Portrait-Painting"	September 1829	Magazine	The Yankee	Art criticism	An "early, unprecedented effort to define a canon of American art"; anticipates John Ruskin's Modern Painters by distinguishing between "things seen by the artist" and "things as they are"; a call for "straightforward realism ... made at the height of the Romantic era"; republished in American Art 1700–1960 (1965)	
"Month at Paris"	October 1829	Magazine	The Yankee	Travel	A treatise on Paris based on Neal's travels in 1827	
Review of Sketches of American Character	October 1829	Magazine	The Yankee	Literary criticism	A review of the book Sketches of American Character by Sarah Josepha Hale praising Hale's writing but lamenting what he sees as the author being confined by societal expectations of her sex	
"Miss Wright's Lectures"	October 1829	Magazine	The Yankee	Feminism and women's rights	Praise for the principles of Boston lectures by Frances Wright, tempered by the assertion that they would have come across better "if spoken with more discretion"	
"Paris — The Women — Street-sketches — Theatre"	November 1829	Magazine	The Yankee	Travel	A treatise on Paris based on Neal's travels in 1827	
"American Engraving.—Token—Souvenir"	November 1829	Magazine	The Yankee	Art criticism	Careful analysis of the engravings in The Token and The Atlantic Souvenir gift books	
"Ambiguities"	December 1829	Magazine	The Yankee	Literary criticism	An analysis of ambiguous and inane qualities in common speech patterns; republished in "Critical Essays and Stories by John Neal" (1962)	
"Unpublished Poetry"	December 1829	Magazine	The Yankee	Literary criticism	Excerpts from Edgar Allan Poe's forthcoming collection Poems and a letter in which Poe claims that Neal's September criticism was "the very first words of encouragement I ever remember to have heard"	
"Influence of Females in Society"	January 1830	Magazine	Ladies' Magazine and Literary Gazette	Feminism and women's rights	A refutation of Basil Hall's claim in Travels in North America in the Years 1827 and 1828 that women's status in the US is lower than in the UK; first of a three-part series on women in the US	
"Architecture. State House of Maine"	January 1830	Magazine	Ladies' Magazine and Literary Gazette	Art criticism	A critique of the architecture of the Maine Maine State House under construction; refers to the Massachusetts State House as "the ugliest building in Christendom"	
"Al Aaraaf, Tamerlane, &c, by Edgar A. Poe. Baltimore. Hatch & Dumming"	January 1830	Magazine	Ladies' Magazine and Literary Gazette	Literary criticism	A short critical notice of Al Aaraaf, Tamerlane, and Minor Poems by Edgar Allan Poe	
"The Women of America"	March and April 1830	Magazine	Ladies' Magazine and Literary Gazette	Feminism and women's rights	Argues for greater educational opportunities for women; the second and third installments of a three-part series on women in the US	
"Poems by Edgar A. Poe"	July 8, 1831	Newspaper	Morning Courier and New-York Enquirer	Literary criticism	A notice of Edgar Allan Poe's poetry	
"Women"	July 29, 1831	Newspaper	Morning Courier and New-York Enquirer	Feminism and women's rights	Opines on the potential for greater independence and self-reliance among American women	
"American Monthlies"	July 30, 1831	Newspaper	Morning Courier and New-York Enquirer	Literary criticism	Praise for Nathaniel Parker Willis's American Monthly Magazine and Sarah Josepha Hale's Ladies' Magazine and sharp criticism of Louis Antoine Godey's Godey's Lady's Book	
"Edinburgh Ideas of Poetry"	August 12, 1831	Newspaper	Morning Courier and New-York Enquirer	Literary criticism	Criticism of Francis Jeffrey's work for the Edinburgh Review and Robert Walsh's work for the National Gazette and Literary Register	
"Paris and Paris Manners"	August 26, November 12, and December 3, 1831	Newspaper	Morning Courier and New-York Enquirer	Travel	Based on Neal's trip to Paris in spring 1827; published over three issues	
"Fine Arts"	September 13, September 28, October 8, October 15, October 21, November 15, and November 19, 1831	Newspaper	Morning Courier and New-York Enquirer	Art criticism	A review of the works at a fine arts exhibition at the Boston Athenæum similar to his "Review of the First Annual Exhibition at Baltimore" (October 1822)	
"North-East Boundary"	October 20, 1831	Newspaper	Morning Courier and New-York Enquirer	Law and politics	Updates on the circumstances leading to the Aroostook War	
Review of Godey's Lady's Book	October 20, November 9, and December 24, 1831	Newspaper	Morning Courier and New-York Enquirer	Literary criticism	Sharp criticism of Louis Antoine Godey's Godey's Lady's Book over three separate articles	
"London Editors"	December 2, 1831	Newspaper	Morning Courier and New-York Enquirer	Travel	Based on Neal's time in London 1824–1827	
"English Tricks"	December 3, 1831	Newspaper	Morning Courier and New-York Enquirer	Travel	Based on Neal's time in London 1824–1827	
"Woman"	June 16, 1832	Magazine	The Bouquet: Flowers of Polite Literature	Feminism and women's rights	Argues for greater intellectual freedom for women in society	
Colonization speech	July 29, July 31, August 1, August 2, August 6, and August 8, 1833	Newspaper	Portland Daily Advertiser	Slavery and race	Full text of Neal's speech during the six-day debate (July 8–13, 1833) with Samuel Fessenden and others over whether or not to establish a Portland auxiliary of the American Colonization Society, followed by written arguments for the colonization movement over abolitionism as a means to end slavery; published in six installments	
"Portraits of Distinguished Contemporaries, No. 1. Dr. Bowring"	November 1833	Magazine	The Knickerbocker	Biography	A biographical sketch of John Bowring	
"Phrenology"	October 1, 1834	Magazine	Portland Magazine, Devoted to Literature	Science	Praise for phrenologist Silas Jones	
"La Revue Francaise"	December 1, 1834	Magazine	Portland Magazine, Devoted to Literature	Social criticism	Ostensibly a review of La Revue française; actually a treatise on the importance of eschewing precedent and convention when forming judgments	
"American Painters"	January 1, February 2, and May 1, 1835	Magazine	Portland Magazine, Devoted to Literature	Art criticism	Notices of three Portland, Maine artists over three installments: Charles Codman, Frederick Mellen (brother of Grenville Mellen), and Joseph T. Harris	
"Children—What Are They?"	1835	Gift book	The Token and Atlantic Souvenir	Children and education	An essay of "considerable popularity and a good deal of republication" and "a sensible, original inquiry into the nature of children"; "the best John Neal has ever written" according to the New-York Mirror; revised and republished in Portland Magazine (April 1, 1835), New England Galaxy (April 18, 1835), Godey's Lady's Book (March 1848 and November 1849), and The Genius of John Neal: Selections from His Writings (1978); excerpted in the New-York Mirror October 18, 1834; excerpted as "Rustic Civility, or Children—What Are They?" in The Ladies' Companion (July 1838); republished as "Children—What Are They Good For?" in Great Mysteries and Little Plagues (1870)	
"Story-Telling"	January 1835	Magazine	The New-England Magazine	Multiple	A discussion of storytelling in paintings by John Wesley Jarvis; acting by James Henry Hackett, Charles Mathews, and George Handel Hill; and oral exchange among strangers aboard American stagecoaches and steamboats; excerpted in the New-York Mirror (April 6, 1839); republished in "Critical Essays and Stories by John Neal" (1962)	
Audubon articles	January 3, February 7, and April 18, 1835	Newspaper	New England Galaxy	Social criticism	An attack on John James Audubon in three articles, questioning his trustworthiness, honesty, and claims to writing and artwork published under Audubon's name; based in part on Neal's conversations with Joseph Mason	
Phrenology articles	January 3, February 14, April 4, August 8, and August 15, 1835	Newspaper	New England Galaxy	Science	A series of five articles defending the veracity of phrenology; a lighthearted debate between himself and junior editor, Horatio Hastings Weld, and notices of lectures in Portland, Maine	
Sylvester Graham articles	January 10, February 14, February 21, February 28, April 18, November 7, November 14, and November 21, 1835	Newspaper	New England Galaxy	Social criticism	A series of eight articles denouncing health lectures by Sylvester Graham with the object "to crucify Dr. Graham ... and all who resemble him"; based on Neal's attendance of Graham's lectures and conversation with Graham in Portland, Maine	
"The Case of Major Mitchell"	January 17, January 24, January 31, February 7, and February 14, 1835	Newspaper	New England Galaxy	Science	An account of Neal's role as the first lawyer to use psychiatric testimony and seek leniency in a US court on account of a defendant's alleged mental defect; published in five installments; reviewed in the Annals of Phrenology (November 1835)	
"The Two Fannies"	January 24, 1835	Newspaper	New England Galaxy	Social criticism	Criticizes Fanny Kemble's dismissal of American character and praises Frances Wright for her activism in the face of criticism from others	
"English Notions"	January 24, March 7, March 14, March 28, April 4, and May 16, 1835	Newspaper	New England Galaxy	Travel	A series of six articles based on Neal's travels in England (1824–1827) comparing English customs and opinions with those of Americans.	
Review of "Stanzas"	February 21, 1835	Newspaper	New England Galaxy	Literary criticism	High praise for the poem "Stanzas" by Elizabeth Oakes Smith: "no man ever wrote anything half so beautiful or sweet"; submitted anonymously, "Stanzas" was Smith's first published writing outside uncredited work as assistant editor of the Portland Advertiser	
"Mr. Furbish—and his Mode of Teaching French"	March 1, 1835	Magazine	Portland Magazine, Devoted to Literature	Children and education	Praise for method of French instruction employed by a local teacher	
Review of Outre-Mer	March 14, 1835	Newspaper	New England Galaxy	Literary criticism	Critique of the prose collection Outre-Mer by Henry Wadsworth Longfellow as "exceedingly beautiful", but derivative of Washington Irving	
Temperance article	April 18, 1835	Newspaper	New England Galaxy	Temperance	Warns of extremism in the temperance movement; disapproves consumption of "distilled liquors" but approves "fermented liquors"	
Review of Anne Lynch Botta	May 30, 1835	Newspaper	New England Galaxy	Literary criticism	Critique of poems "The Mediterranean," "To the Sub," and "Byron Sleeping amid the Ruins of Greece" by Anne Lynch Botta as derivative of Lord Byron but showing immense promise for Botta's future work	
"New England Scenery and Character"	June 6, 1835	Magazine	The Boston Pearl and Literary Gazette	Regionalism and nationalism	Purports New England's rugged landscape as the source of the character of its residents	
"Women"	June 13, 1835	Newspaper	New England Galaxy	Feminism and women's rights	Decries lack of adult education and social opportunities for women	
"Education"	July 4, 1835	Newspaper	New England Galaxy	Feminism and women's rights	Editorial on the value of adult education for married women	
"The Pound of Flesh — No Fiction"	July 25, 1835	Newspaper	New England Galaxy	Law and politics	An attack on a money lender in Portland, Maine for predatory practices; followed by articles on the subject on August 15, August 29, September 12, October 3, and October 24, 1835; resulted in the lender making a substantial donation to a local charity	
"Recollections"	August 8, September 5, November 28, December 5, December 12, and December 26, 1835	Newspaper	New England Galaxy	Travel	A series of six articles based on Neal's travels in England (1824–1827) comparing English customs and opinions with those of Americans.	
"Profile Sketches. Robert Owen, of Lanark"	September 19, 1835	Magazine	The Boston Pearl and Literary Gazette	Biography	Biographical sketch of Robert Owen, as contrasted with John Dunn Hunter, based on Neal's experience with both in London; republished as "Profile Sketches No I" in the New England Galaxy (October 10, 1835)	
Review of Southern Literary Messenger	September 26, October 31, and December 12, 1835	Newspaper	New England Galaxy	Literary criticism	High praise for Edgar Allan Poe's work for the Southern Literary Messenger, his short story "Bon-Bon," and his poem "The Coliseum"; refers to Poe as "emphatically a man of genius"	
"The Pearl.—Boston.—Isaac C. Pray"	October 1, 1835	Magazine	Portland Magazine, Devoted to Literature	Literary criticism	Favorable notice of the Boston Pearl, edited by Isaac Pray	
Review of The Token and Atlantic Souvenir for 1836	October 3, 1835	Newspaper	New England Galaxy	Literary criticism	Includes an attack on Samuel Griswold Goodrich for altering Neal's "The Young Phrenologist" in The Token and Atlantic Souvenir	
"Profile Sketches No II"	October 17, 1835	Newspaper	New England Galaxy	Biography	A biographical sketch of Scottish geologist John MacCulloch based on their common association with Jeremy Bentham in London 1825–1827	
"Profile Sketches No III"	October 24, 1835	Newspaper	New England Galaxy	Biography	A biographical sketch of London editor Henry Southern based on their association during Neal's stay in London 1824–1827	
"Paulding's Works"	October 31, 1835	Newspaper	New England Galaxy	Literary criticism	Favorable review of James Kirke Paulding's writings from the perspective of American literary nationalism	
"The Value of Good Looks"	December 1835	Magazine	The Ladies' Companion	Social criticism	"A trifling essay" that recognizes the privileges afforded by society to those considered beautiful	
"Prose and Verse, By Isaac C. Pray"	March 1, 1836	Magazine	Portland Magazine, Devoted to Literature	Literary criticism	Brief notice of Prose and Verse by Isaac Pray	
"Grenville Mellen's Ode to Spurzheim"	March 1, 1836	Magazine	Portland Magazine, Devoted to Literature	Literary criticism	Brief notice of the poem Ode to Spurzheim by Grenville Mellen, noting that Johann Spurzheim is hardly mentioned despite the dedication	
"Corrected Proofs, By H.H. Weld, of the Galaxy"	March 1, 1836	Magazine	Portland Magazine, Devoted to Literature	Literary criticism	Brief critique of Corrected Proofs by Horatio Hastings Weld	
"Pic-Nics — From t'other Side"	December 1836	Magazine	The Ladies' Companion	Travel	Based on his own journal, a "rambling, desultory comment" on events, places, and people Neal encountered in England, including the Italian Opera House, the British Museum, Benjamin West, Charles Robert Leslie, Felicia Hemans, and St James's Park	
"Women"	1837	Book	Boston Book. Being Specimens of Metropolitan Literature	Feminism and women's rights	Musings on contrasts between the character of men and women similar to articles he wrote for The Yankee	
"Mrs. Fry—and a Quaker Marriage"	August 1838	Magazine	The Ladies' Companion	Travel	An account of the wedding of a son of Elizabeth Fry that Neal attended in England	
"Down-East Notions — No. I"	January 19, 1839	Magazine	The New-Yorker	Multiple	A "potpourri of comment," ending with a comment on the developing Aroostook War; first in series of six articles under the same title	
"Down-East Notions — No. II"	February 2, 1839	Magazine	The New-Yorker	Literary criticism	A refutation of comments about Aaron Burr in the recently published Private Journal of Aaron Burr, during his Residence of Four Years in Europe; With Selections from his Correspondence based on Neal's interactions with Jeremy Bentham concerning Burr as recorded in his translation of Principles of Legislation: from the MS of Jeremy Bentham (1830); continued over number III in the series; second in series of six articles under the same title	
"Down-East Notions — No. III"	February 16 and 23, 1839	Magazine	The New-Yorker	Literary criticism	A refutation of comments about Aaron Burr in the recently published Private Journal of Aaron Burr, during his Residence of Four Years in Europe; With Selections from his Correspondence based on Neal's interactions with Jeremy Bentham concerning Burr as recorded in his translation of Principles of Legislation: from the MS of Jeremy Bentham (1830); continued from number II in the series; third in series of six articles under the same title	
"Down-East Notions — No. IV"	March 2, 1839	Magazine	The New-Yorker	Law and politics	Commentary on the impending Aroostook War and its causes; fourth in series of six articles under the same title	
"Down-East Notions — No. V"	March 16, 1839	Magazine	The New-Yorker	Law and politics	Commentary on the developing resolutions of the Aroostook War; fifth in series of six articles under the same title	
"Down-East Notions — No. VI"	March 23, 1839	Magazine	The New-Yorker	Multiple	An affirmation of Neal's faith in phrenology, an endorsement of Isaac Ray's A Treatise on the Medical Jurisprudence of Insanity, a defense of John Pierpont's Moral Rule of Political Action sermon (January 27, 1839), and an account of meeting Leigh Hunt in London in 1826; sixth in series of six articles under the same title	
"Lying in State"	May 1839	Magazine	The Ladies' Companion	Social criticism	A criticism of the lying in state tradition in the UK	
"The New-Englanders"	June 1839	Magazine	The Ladies' Companion	Regionalism and nationalism	An essay on New England Yankee character; second of three works in the "Sketches by Lamp-Light" series for The Ladies' Companion	
"The Sea"	September 1839	Magazine	The Ladies' Companion	Science	An essay about ocean currents, winds, evaporation, atmospheric pressure, land elevations, sea depressions, tides, and other measurable phenomena, as well as the role of oceans in human society; excerpted in The New-Yorker (October 5, 1839)	
"Progress of the Harrisonburg Whig Nomination"	December 14, 1839	Newspaper	National Intelligencer	Law and politics	A report of the "Washington Dinner" for Henry Clay after his unsuccessful presidential bid at the 1839 Whig National Convention	
"Torpedoes, Powder-Mills and Steam-boats. 'Up? — or Down?'"	February 3, 1840	Newspaper	The Evening Signal	Law and politics	A call for better construction and operation practices for steamships following the destruction of the Lexington the previous month	
"The North Eastern Boundary"	February 11 and March 24, 1840	Newspaper	The Evening Signal	Law and politics	A report on the border issues leading to the Aroostook War; published in two installments; republished in The New World (February 15 and March 28, 1840)	
"Law and Lawyers"	February 15, 1840	Newspaper	The Evening Signal	Law and politics	A critique of the law profession, its propensity for esoteric language, and issues of trust; republished in The New World (February 22, 1840)	
"Traits of the New-Englanders; Otherwise, The Yankees"	February 15, 1840	Magazine	The American Miscellany of Popular Tales, Essays, Sketches of Character, Poetry, and Jeux D'Esprit	Regionalism and nationalism	Description of New England character; claims the "unconquerable and inconceivable enthusiasm, and waywardness and extravagance" of New Englanders as a cause of the American Revolutionary War	
Review of Longfellow	February 20, 1840	Newspaper	The Evening Signal	Literary criticism	Favorable reviews of Henry Wadsworth Longfellow's poetry collection Voices of the Night and novel Hyperion; republished in The New World (February 22, 1840)	
"Self-Education"	February 25, 1840	Newspaper	The Evening Signal	Children and education	Praise for autodidacticism, naming Joseph Ripley Chandler and Erastus Brooks as examples; republished in The New World (February 29, 1840)	
Review of Mary Gove Nichols	February 27, 1840	Newspaper	The Evening Signal	Social criticism	Favorable review of lectures by Mary Gove Nichols; republished in The New World (February 29, 1840)	
"Portland Writers"	February 29, 1840	Newspaper	The Evening Signal	Literary criticism	An annotated list of authors from Portland, Maine; republished in the Portland Tribune circa 1842	
"Rights of Women"	March 5, 1840	Newspaper	The Evening Signal	Feminism and women's rights	Argues for women's suffrage as an issue of taxation without representation; voices arguments used later in the "Rights of Woman" speech (1843); republished in The New World (March 7, 1840)	
"The President of the U. States and Wm Lyon Mckenzie"	March 28, 1840	Newspaper	The New World	Law and politics	Criticism of a proposal that President Martin Van Buren should convince the UK to sue for the release of William Lyon Mackenzie from prison in the US	
"Wheeling, Virginia — First Impressions"	April 4, 1840	Newspaper	The Evening Signal	Travel	Impressions of Wheeling, West Virginia, based on Neal's visit in the fall of 1833	
Review of George Combe	April 4, 1840	Newspaper	The New World	Science	Praise for phrenological lecturer George Combe	
"Cincinnati, Ohio — First Impressions"	April 6, 1840	Newspaper	The Evening Signal	Travel	Impressions of Cincinnati based on Neal's visit over the winter of 1833–1834	
"Lawyers and Pettifoggers"	April 11, 1840	Newspaper	The Evening Signal	Law and politics	Questions the character of America's more influential lawyers and lawmakers; republished in The New World (April 18, 1840)	
"Words, Words, Words"	April 18, 1840	Newspaper	The Evening Signal	English language	A playful reaction to editor Park Benjamin's criticism of Neal's use of language	
"A letter to Park Benjamin and Epes Sargent: 'The Eliovich Case'"	May 30, 1840	Magazine	Brother Jonathan	Literary criticism	Seeks to justify the recent publication of a pamphlet by alleged con man John Bratish Eliovich and attacks the editors of The New World for refusing to publish it	
"Our Institutions — and their Progress"	Circa 1841	Newspaper	Portland Tribune	Social criticism	Sharp criticism of the Eastern State Penitentiary	
"Biographical Sketch of Grenville Mellen"	November 15, 1841	Magazine	The Family Companion and Ladies' Mirror: A Monthly Magazine of Polite Literature	Biography	A short biography of Grenville Mellen	
"The Unforgotten Dead. Recollections of the Late Grenville Mellen"	January 1, January 29, and February 19, 1842	Magazine	Brother Jonathan	Biography	A short postmortem biography of Grenville Mellen, focusing on his earlier life and based on letters Neal exchanged with him; published in three installments	
"Right of Search"	January 15, 1842	Magazine	Brother Jonathan	Law and politics	"Flamboyant warnings of British abuse of the right of search on the seas"	
"Russia — and Her Encroachments"	January 15, 1842	Magazine	Brother Jonathan	Law and politics	"Flamboyant warnings of ... Russia's encroachment on the Northwest Boundary"	
"Sketches from Life. Mrs. Sarah Austin"	January 15, 1842	Magazine	The Family Companion and Ladies' Mirror: A Monthly Magazine of Polite Literature	Biography	A short biography of Sarah Austin	
"Animal Magnetism, or Mesmerism"	January 15, 1842	Magazine	The Family Companion and Ladies' Mirror: A Monthly Magazine of Polite Literature	Science	A short essay championing the veracity of animal magnetism	
"Second Annual Report of the Directors of the Maine Insane Hospital"	February 12, 1842	Magazine	Brother Jonathan	Science	Praise for the Maine Insane Hospital under the guidance of Isaac Ray	
"Sketches from Life. Mrs. Ann S. Stephens"	February 15, 1842	Magazine	The Family Companion and Ladies' Mirror: A Monthly Magazine of Polite Literature	Biography	A short biography of Ann S. Stephens; second biography in the "Sketches from Life" series	
"Sketches from Life. No. III—Mrs. Seba Smith"	May 15, 1842	Magazine	The Family Companion and Ladies' Mirror: A Monthly Magazine of Polite Literature	Biography	A short biography of Elizabeth Oakes Smith; third biography in the "Sketches from Life" series; republished in the Portland Tribune (circa 1842) and the preface to The Sinless Child and Other Poems (1843)	
"Intercourse of the Sexes"	May 25, 1842	Newspaper	Portland Tribune	Feminism and women's rights	Argues that both men and women improve by "the habit of free, graceful and continual conversation with the other sex"	
"Self-Education"	August 1842	Magazine	The Indicator: A Miscellany of Self-Improvement	Children and education	Argues for the supremacy of vocational education knowledge over liberal education; republished in Godey's Lady's Book (May 1848)	
"Law Clubs"	August 1842	Magazine	The Indicator: A Miscellany of Self-Improvement	Law and politics	An essay in the form of a letter with advice on forming a Law society and study of political economy	
"Aaron Burr"	January 1843	Magazine	The Pioneer	Biography	A biographical sketch of Aaron Burr, focusing on his moral character and alleging that he offered his daughter as a mistress to Jeremy Bentham; republished in Wheler's Southern Monthly Magazine (1850)	
"The Two Portraits"	January 1843	Magazine	The Boston Miscellany of Literature and Fashion	Social criticism	A purportedly true story of Thomas Sully being commissioned by a husband and wife unbeknownst of each other for anniversary gift portraits to the other; concludes that everyone's lives produce story-worthy material	
"Other Days; or Disinterred Opinions"	January 1843	Magazine	The Magnolia; or, Southern Appalachian	Biography	Memories of Grenville Mellen, based on Neal's letters to him	
"Little Monsters"	January 15, 1843	Magazine	The Family Companion and Ladies' Mirror: A Monthly Magazine of Polite Literature	Children and education	A short essay on the proper treatment of children that advocates baby talk; republished in Brother Jonathan magazine (November 18, 1843)	
"Newspapers"	February 1843	Magazine	The Pioneer	Social criticism	Considers the role and future of the free press in American society	
"Lanman's Essays — Third Edition"	February 25, 1843	Magazine	The New World	Literary criticism	Praise for Essays for Summer Hours by Charles Lanman; republished in the Portland Tribune circa 1843	
"Health Journal—Its Correspondents and Doctor Graham"	May 6, 1843	Magazine	Brother Jonathan	Social criticism	Rescinds many criticisms of Sylvester Graham made by Neal in the New England Galaxy in 1834; influenced by Mary Gove Nichols	
"Glimpses of the Past"	May 6, May 27, June 10, and July 29, 1843	Magazine	Brother Jonathan	Travel	Discussions of English and French celebrities, landmarks, customs, and speech; based on Neal's travels in England and France 1824–1827; published in five installments (the fifth in the same issue as the fourth and under the title "Comforts of Travelling")	
"Wilson of Blackwood: Otherwise Called Christopher North"	May 13, 1843	Magazine	Brother Jonathan	Literary criticism	Praise for John Wilson and Blackwood's Magazine as "by far the boldest, and best Magazine, ever published"	
"Self-Respect"	May 20, 1843	Magazine	Brother Jonathan	Regionalism and nationalism	Complains of obsequiousness among Americans in regards to Charles Dickens and his visit to the US	
"The Graham Writers"	May 27, 1843	Magazine	Brother Jonathan	Literary criticism	Brief critiques of the principal contributors to Graham's Magazine	
Review of George Pope Morris	May 30, 1843	Newspaper	Portland Tribune	Literary criticism	Favorable review of The Deserted Bride, and Other Poems by George Pope Morris	
"British Penditti—Free Trade, &c. &c. &c."	June 3, 1843	Magazine	Brother Jonathan	Regionalism and nationalism	A litany of complaints against British literary figures for plagiarizing, pirating, and committing other disservices of American authors	
"Our National Sins"	June 10, 1843	Magazine	Brother Jonathan	Children and education	Refutes the notion in The Social Principle by William Gilmore Simms that love of money is a national sin; advocates monetary education at all levels of school	
"Rights of Women: The Substance of a Lecture Delivered by John Neal, at the Tabernacle"	June 17, 1843	Magazine	Brother Jonathan	Feminism and women's rights	Neal's most influential statement on women's rights; lecture originally delivered January 24, 1843 before 3,000 attendees at the Broadway Tabernacle; "a scathing satire," according to the History of Woman Suffrage; republished in The Genius of John Neal: Selections from His Writings (1978)	
"Writings of Cornelius Mathews"	June 24, 1843	Magazine	Brother Jonathan	Literary criticism	Praise for the writings of Cornelius Mathews; continues as "Puffer Hopkins—by Cornelius Mathews" (September 9, 1843)	
"A Word to the Wise"	June 24, 1843	Magazine	Brother Jonathan	Literature	An attempted expansive definition of poetry	
"Freedom of Speech"	July 15, 1843	Magazine	Brother Jonathan	Law and politics	Advocates greater freedom of speech in the press	
"Woman! Letter to Mrs. T. J. Farnham, on the Rights of Women. Being a Reply to her Argument in the Brother Jonathan of June 24th, 1843"	July 15, 1843	Magazine	Brother Jonathan	Feminism and women's rights	Responds to arguments against women's suffrage by Eliza Farnham, prompted by Neal's "Rights of Women" speech on January 24 of that year; "Mrs. Farnham lived long enough to retrace her ground and accept the highest truth," according to the History of Woman Suffrage; republished in The Genius of John Neal: Selections from His Writings (1978)	
"Comforts of Traveling"	July 22, 1843	Magazine	Brother Jonathan	Travel	Based on Neal's experience in Paris in 1827	
"Our Public Men: Edward Everett"	July 29, 1843	Magazine	Brother Jonathan	Biography	Biographical sketch of Massachusetts Whig politician Edward Everett	
"Jeremy Bentham"	August 5, 1843	Magazine	Brother Jonathan	Biography	Praise for Jeremy Bentham	
"To Mrs. Eliza W. Farnham"	August 5, 1843	Magazine	Brother Jonathan	Feminism and women's rights	Concluding remarks to Eliza Farnham's second essay prompted by Neal's "Rights of Women" speech on January 24 of that year; republished in The Genius of John Neal: Selections from His Writings (1978)	
"The Dickens!"	August 19, 1843	Magazine	Brother Jonathan	Regionalism and nationalism	Complains of obsequiousness among Americans in regards to Charles Dickens and his visit to the US	
"Yankee Tongue—And Its Corruptions"	August 26, 1843	Magazine	Brother Jonathan	Regionalism and nationalism	Complaints against representations of New England dialect in British literature, particularly Sam Slick in England by Thomas Chandler Haliburton	
"Another Star in the East"	September 2, 1843	Magazine	Brother Jonathan	Law and politics	Unfavorable notice of the formation of the Maine Liberty Party	
"Our Public Men Number Two: Daniel Webster"	September 2, 1843	Magazine	Brother Jonathan	Biography	Biographical sketch of politician Daniel Webster	
"Home Literature"	September 9, 1843	Magazine	Brother Jonathan	Law and politics	Advocates an American copyright law that would protect American authors from competition with pirated British works	
"Letters from New York—By L. Maria Child"	September 9, 1843	Magazine	Brother Jonathan	Literary criticism	Praise for the book Letters from New-York by Lydia Maria Child as "worth its weight in gold"	
"James Russell Lowell"	September 9, 1843	Magazine	Brother Jonathan	Literary criticism	Praise for poet James Russell Lowell as "one of the ripest, purest, and withal most promising poets"	
"A Bachelor's Notions"	September 9 and 16, 1843	Magazine	Brother Jonathan	Travel	Memories of the Her Majesty's Theatre and other experiences in London from Neal's residence there 1824–1827	
"Our Contributors"	September 16, 1843	Magazine	Brother Jonathan	Literary criticism	Brief critiques of the principal contributors to Brother Jonathan	
"Death, or Medorus' Dream. By the Author of Ahasuerus"	September 16, 1843	Magazine	Brother Jonathan	Literary criticism	A scathing review of the poetry collection Death; or, Medorus' Dream by Robert Tyler	
"Our Women"	September 23, 1843	Magazine	Brother Jonathan	Feminism and women's rights	Asserts that women's poor wages and economic dependence on men are symptoms of political disfranchisement; celebrates recent advances toward Married Women's Property Acts in the United States	
"Audubon—the American Naturalist!"	September 30, 1843	Magazine	Brother Jonathan	Biography	"Contemptuous accusations against Audubon"; "chock full on Nealisms and tart Yankee wit"	
"The Brother Jonathan"	September 30, 1843	Magazine	Brother Jonathan	Regionalism and nationalism	Asks why Brother Jonathan is not recognized as the American national personification as John Bull is for the UK	
"Self-Reliance and Self-Distrust"	October 1843	Magazine	The Indicator: A Miscellany of Self-Improvement	Social criticism	A recommendation of self-reliance "even to the point of vanity and conceit" tempered by a warning against boasting; republished in the Portland Tribune circa 1843	
"More Chuzzle-Wit"	October 14, 1843	Magazine	Brother Jonathan	Literary criticism	Accuses Martin Chuzzlewit by Charles Dickens as misrepresenting American dialects and lifestyles; insists that quotation marks are unnecessary for dialogue if properly written	
"God Save the King! and God Help the People"	October 14, 1843	Magazine	Brother Jonathan	Regionalism and nationalism	Asserts that the UK's greatest literary achievements were plagiarized from authors of other nationalities	
"National Pride"	October 14, 1843	Magazine	Brother Jonathan	Regionalism and nationalism	Complaints against British travel writers abusing American hospitality	
"Irish Insolence"	October 14, 1843	Magazine	Brother Jonathan	Regionalism and nationalism	Objects to the dismissal of American poets by Dublin University Magazine given the scarcity of Irish poetry	
"French Without a Master"	October 14, 1843	Magazine	Brother Jonathan	Children and education	Favorable review of the language instruction book French Without a Master by Alexander H. Monteith; insists that learning a new language from a book is impossible	
"The Learned Blacksmith"	October 14, 1843	Magazine	Brother Jonathan	Literary criticism	Praise for Elihu Burritt's translations and sharp criticism of the newspapers who published his work without paying him	
"Criticism Extraordinary: The New Mirror and Mrs. Butler's Poetry"	October 21, 1843	Magazine	Brother Jonathan	Literary criticism	Sharp criticism of the poem "Absence" by Fanny Kemble and George Pope Morris's praise for it	
"Our Wives and Sweethearts"	October 21, 1843	Magazine	Brother Jonathan	Feminism and women's rights	Calls for higher wages for women	
"Lowell, (Massachusetts)"	October 28, 1843	Magazine	Brother Jonathan	Feminism and women's rights	Decries disparity in economic opportunities for men and women in the textile mills of Lowell, Massachusetts	
"Writing Poetry"	October 28, 1843	Magazine	Brother Jonathan	Literature	A warning against unmitigated poetry production: "The better Poet you are, the worse Man you will be"	
"The Fair Sex"	October 28, 1843	Magazine	Brother Jonathan	Feminism and women's rights	Deplores the exclusion of women from American courts	
"American Authors"	November 18, 1843	Magazine	Brother Jonathan	Law and politics	Advocates an American copyright law that would protect American authors from competition with pirated British works	
"Moral and Spiritual Culture in Early Education. By R. C. Waterston. Boston"	December 1843	Magazine	The Indicator: A Miscellany of Self-Improvement	Children and education	Praise for Reverend Robert Cassie Waterston's "On Moral and Spiritual Culture in Early Education" lecture before the American Institute of Instruction (1836), particularly its recognition of the significance of children	
"Rights of Women"	December 2, 1843	Magazine	Brother Jonathan	Feminism and women's rights	Praise for women's rights successes around the US	
"Rights of Women—Acknowledged!"	December 16, 1843	Magazine	Brother Jonathan	Feminism and women's rights	Notice of women's rights successes in Georgia and North Carolina; offers a vision of a future of enhanced rights for women	
"Over Sea, in Other Days"	Circa 1844	Newspaper	Portland Tribune	Travel	Remarks on England based on Neal's travels 1824–1827; published in three installments	
Review of Isaac Ray	Circa 1844	Newspaper	Portland Tribune	Science	Favorable review of Medical Jurisprudence of Insanity by Isaac Ray	
"Slavery"	January 27, 1844	Newspaper	Portland Tribune	Slavery and race	"Neal's most significant pronouncement" on slavery; repeats arguments made in "A Summary View of America" (1824) and "United States" (1826); argues for gradual emancipation and colonization	
"Rights of Women"	February 3, 1844	Newspaper	Portland Tribune	Feminism and women's rights	Mocks an argument in the National Intelligencer against women in law and politics and ridicule felt by two women attempting to establish a newspaper in New York City	
Disavowal of Bratish	February 10, 1844	Newspaper	Portland Tribune	Social criticism	Disavowal of Neal's own pamphlet Appeal from the American Press to the American People, in Behalf of John Bratish Eliovich and rejection of alleged con man John Bratish Eliovich as "an arrant scamp"	
St. Lawrence and Atlantic Railroad articles	February 4, February 5, February 8, February 12, February 17, February 19, February 24, March 3, March 10, March 12 March 22, April 2, April 4, April 5, April 7, July 16, and July 26, 1845	Newspaper	Portland Daily Advertiser	Railroads	A series of seventeen articles advocating the proposed St. Lawrence and Atlantic Railroad	
"Progress of Opinion"	July 1847	Magazine	The Union Magazine of Literature and Art	Social criticism	Contends humanity is moving toward abolition of war through global unification through ideas; inspired by the work of William Ladd	
"Phantasmagoria"	May 1848	Magazine	Graham's Magazine	Literature	A demonstration of the observation and imagination required to transform real commonplace experiences into literature; "one of Neal's best performances"; submitted to George Rex Graham September 20, 1843; republished in The Dew-Drop: A Tribute of Affection (1852)	
Report of St. Lawrence and Atlantic Railroad	July 8, 1848	Newspaper	Portland Transcript	Railroads	Report of the opening of the portion of the St. Lawrence and Atlantic Railroad between Portland and Yarmouth, Maine	
"What is Poetry? And What Is It Good For?"	January 1849	Magazine	Sartain's Union Magazine of Literature and Art	Literature	Asserts that all are poets though few recognize it in themselves; claims poetry as a necessary refinement and embellishment of the world; marks a departure from Neal's earlier opinion of poetry as "superficial adornment" and "deliberate falsification of fact"; republished in "Critical Essays and Stories by John Neal" (1962)	
"The French Claims"	January 17, January 19, January 22, January 25, January 28, February 21, February 27, March 4, March 11, and March 27, 1850	Newspaper	Portland Daily Advertiser	Law and politics	Argues that the US government should compensate owners of ships seized by Napoleonic France who suffered economically in agreements made with the French Directory	
"New Elements of Geometry"	January 29, 1850	Newspaper	Portland Daily Advertiser	Science	Praise for the "eccentric mathematical views" in Seba Smith's book New Elements of Geometry	
"Alehouse Politicians, or Annexation Settled For Ever"	March 1850	Magazine	Sartain's Union Magazine of Literature and Art	Regionalism and nationalism	"A good-natured organized debate" about the governments and character of the US and UK as they concern American annexation of Canada; written to accompany an engraving; republished serially over five issues of the State of Maine (September 10, 13, 14, 15, and 16, 1853)	
"Edgar A. Poe"	March 19 and April 26, 1850	Newspaper	Portland Daily Advertiser	Biography	A refutation of Rufus Wilmot Griswold's biography of Edgar Allan Poe in two installments; republished in The Genius of John Neal: Selections from His Writings (1978)	
European and North American Railway articles	July 18, August 1, and August 3, 1850; March 7, 1851; and September 19, 1853	Newspaper	Portland Daily Advertiser and State of Maine	Railroads	A series of five articles advocating the proposed European and North American Railway; all published in the Advertiser except September 19, 1853	
"A Few Words about Tobacco with Some Account of the Incurables"	February 1851	Magazine	Sartain's Union Magazine of Literature and Art	Temperance	A condemnation of "tobacco in every shape, opium in every shape, alcohol in every shape, all three but different names for one and the same thing" dismissing the work of Sylvester Graham and Walter Raleigh; accompanied by a drawing	
"Law and Lawyers"	March 1852	Magazine	Graham's Magazine	Law and politics	The substance of a lecture Neal had been delivering for years; an attack on American lawyers as a privileged "legal oligarchy" with undue influence in politics	
"Thinking Aloud; or, Suggestions and Glimpses"	August 1852	Magazine	Sartain's Union Magazine of Literature and Art	English language	Uplifts the value of natural diction in writing and expression of thought as it spontaneously occurs to the writer; includes an analysis of New England speech and character he saw as underrepresented in literature; republished in The Genius of John Neal: Selections from His Writings (1978)	
"Legislation"	August 10, 1853	Newspaper	State of Maine	Temperance	Opines that legislation not reflected by popular opinion cannot be successfully enforced, emphasizing the Maine Law as an example	
"The Liquor Law of Maine"	August 24, September 1, September 7, September 8, September 12, and October 14, 1853	Newspaper	State of Maine	Temperance	Expresses Neal's long support for the temperance movement but opposition to the Maine Law and wariness of its champion Neal Dow as "untrustworthy," "wilful," [sic] and "conceited"; in six installments	
"Pleasantries"	September 22, 1853	Newspaper	State of Maine	Temperance	Criticizes of the Maine Law and leverages personal attacks against its champion Neal Dow	
"Professor Stowe, D.D."	October 7 and 10, 1853	Newspaper	State of Maine	Temperance	Leverages personal attacks against prohibitionist Neal Dow; published in two installments	
"Pelting with Roses"	October 11, 1853	Newspaper	State of Maine	Temperance	Leverages personal attacks against prohibitionist Neal Dow	
Review of The Song of Hiawatha	November 27, 1853	Newspaper	State of Maine	Literary criticism	Praise for Henry Wadsworth Longfellow's epic poem The Song of Hiawatha and defense of it against criticism by others	
"Fine Arts. Akers' Statue of Benjamin in Egypt"	March 1854	Magazine	The Una: A Paper Devoted to the Elevation of Woman	Art criticism	Republished review of a Benjamin Paul Akers statue prefaced by note from Neal	
Letter to Paulina Kellogg Wright Davis	July 1854	Magazine	The Una: A Paper Devoted to the Elevation of Woman	Literary criticism	Praises Paulina Kellogg Wright Davis's editorship of The Una: "You are doing your work womanfully"	
Letter on Tilton's Titian and Claude	June 21, 1855	Magazine	The Crayon: A Journal Dedicated to the Graphic Arts and the Literature Related to Them	Art criticism	An announcement of an exhibition at the Boston Athenæum of two paintings allegedly by Claude Lorrain and Titian, discovered by John Rollin Tilton in Rome; corrections published in the July 18, 1855 issue	
"The Titian and Claude"	August 1, 1855	Magazine	The Crayon: A Journal Dedicated to the Graphic Arts and the Literature Related to Them	Art criticism	Supports the claims in his June 9, 1855 submission about the Claude Lorrain and Titian paintings discovered by John Rollin Tilton in Rome; includes notes from the editor refuting Neal's claims	
"The Danaë"	August 22, 1855	Magazine	The Crayon: A Journal Dedicated to the Graphic Arts and the Literature Related to Them	Art criticism	Supports the claims in his June 9, 1855 and August 1, 1855 submissions about the Claude Lorrain and Titian paintings discovered by John Rollin Tilton in Rome	
"Art Hints. Architecture, Sculpture, and Painting. By James Jackson Jarves"	October 1855	Magazine	North American Review	Art criticism	A review of Art-Hints, Architecture, Sculpture and Painting by James Jackson Jarves; argues that painting, sculpture, poetry, music, and architecture all stem from a common artistic motive	
"Portland Writers"	April 7, 1860	Newspaper	Portland Transcript	Literary criticism	A notice of various writers based in Portland, Maine	
Notice of Franklin Simmons	July 21, 1860	Newspaper	Portland Transcript	Art criticism	A notice of sculptor Franklin Simmons	
"Masquerading"	March 1864	Magazine	The Northern Monthly	Feminism and women's rights	"One of the most interesting essays of his career"; "an incisive piece of feminist social criticism" disguised "as a conservative critique of current fashion"; "the beginning of the last phase of Neal's feminist journalism"	
"Watercolors — Mrs. Elizabeth Murray"	April 1864	Magazine	The Northern Monthly	Art criticism	Praise for painter Elizabeth Murray, then living in Portland, Maine	
"Painters and Painting"	June 1864	Magazine	The Northern Monthly	Art criticism	A short outline of accomplishments by painters based in Portland, Maine over the preceding thirty-five years, including Charles E. Beckett, Charles Codman, John Rollin Tilton, and Harrison Bird Brown	
"Life Assurance"	June 1864	Magazine	The Northern Monthly	Social criticism	A treatise on the importance of life insurance "which was nothing more nor less than a clever piece of advertising" for the Mutual Benefit Life Insurance Company, of which Neal was the state agent	
"Our Painters — Charles Codman"	August 1864	Magazine	The Northern Monthly	Art criticism	An account of the career of landscape painter Charles Codman	
"Our Painters — John Rollin Tilton"	October 1864	Magazine	The Northern Monthly	Art criticism	An account of the work of painter John Rollin Tilton	
"Jeremy Bentham"	October 1865	Magazine	Atlantic Monthly	Biography	A biographical sketch of Jeremy Bentham	
"William Blackwood"	December 1865	Magazine	Atlantic Monthly	Biography	A biographical sketch of William Blackwood	
"London Forty Years Ago"	August 1866	Magazine	Atlantic Monthly	Travel	Recollections from Neal's time in London 1824–1827; includes Neal's professed faith in phrenology as a legitimate science based on more than thirty years of research	
"Phrenology and Physiognomy"	September and October 1866	Magazine	American Phrenological Journal	Science	Two-part testimonial of the scientific soundness of phrenology and Physiognomy and of Neal's interest in the fields over more than forty years; includes an account of his role as the first lawyer to use phrenological evidence in a US court	
"John Pierpont"	November 1866	Magazine	Atlantic Monthly	Biography	A biographical sketch of John Pierpont	
"The Old Boy: or, Traveling Incog."	November 1866	Magazine	Beadle's Monthly, a Magazine of To-day	Travel	A questionably true account of Neal's travels in Philadelphia and Le Havre encountering the same men in both locations that "can hardly be dignified as a story ... with only a moderate degree of attention to detail"	
"What Is Education?"	December 1866 and January 1867	Magazine	American Phrenological Journal	Children and education	In two installments; second installment titled "Once More — What Is Education?"; criticism of narrow and dogmatic approaches in schools and universities and praise for the Hazelwood School and Round Hill School	
"Woman's Rights — and Woman's Wrongs"	March and April 1867	Magazine	American Phrenological Journal	Feminism and women's rights	An essay in support of women's suffrage; published in two installments	
"Eloquence.— Its Diversity"	July 1867	Magazine	American Phrenological Journal	Social criticism	Argues that true eloquence is based in an attachment to truth; offers William Pinkney as a negative example	
"On the Study of Languages"	August 1867	Magazine	American Phrenological Journal	Children and education	A treatise on the value of learning languages and an outline of Neal's recommended procedure for language study	
"Social Relations"	December 1867	Magazine	American Phrenological Journal	Social criticism	"Argues the value of friendliness and playfulness in the business of life"	
"A Mysterious Personage"	December 1867	Magazine	Atlantic Monthly	Biography	A summary of Neal's relationship with alleged con man John Bratish Eliovich	
"Clap on the Brakes!"	February 1868	Magazine	American Phrenological Journal	Social criticism	An argument for leisure and deliberate observation in life	
"Phantasmagoria"	April and June 1868	Magazine	American Phrenological Journal	Biography	A series of brief biographical sketches in two installments on people Neal knew from his time in the UK: John Russell, George Cruikshank, Sarah Austin, Francis Burdett, Anna D. Wheeler, Frank Place, Leigh Hunt, John Bowring, John Arthur Roebuck, Humphry Davy, Henry Francis Cary, Jeremy Bentham, John Cartwright, John Dunn Hunter, and Stratford Canning	
"Salome"	June 1868	Magazine	Putnam's Magazine	Literary criticism	An enthusiastic review of Joseph Converse Heywood's poetry; contends "poetry as proof of man's higher nature"	
"Our Painters"	December 1868 and March 1869	Magazine	Atlantic Monthly	Art criticism	Republished in Observations on American Art: Selections from the Writings of John Neal (1793–1876) (1943); based on notes from his stay in London over forty years earlier; published in two installments	
"Woman Suffrage"	January 7, 1869	Newspaper	The Revolution	Feminism and women's rights	Argues for women's suffrage and against double moral standard for men and women; originally published in the Portland Press	
"The Subjection of Women"	October 14, 1869	Newspaper	The Revolution	Feminism and women's rights	Praise for The Subjection of Women by John Stuart Mill	
"A Contented Woman"	November 4, 1869	Newspaper	The Revolution	Feminism and women's rights	A point-by-point refutation of an anti-suffrage article in the Rhode Island Bulletin	
"The Woman Who Dared"	November 4, 1869	Newspaper	The Revolution	Feminism and women's rights	Praise for the epic poem The Woman Who Dared by Epes Sargent and its treatment of marriage and poor economic opportunities for women	
"The Woman's Parliament"	November 25, 1869	Newspaper	The Revolution	Feminism and women's rights	Commentary of proceedings of a recent women's suffrage meeting; proclaims women's influence on public opinion as no substitute for suffrage; argues for equality of partnership in marriage	
"Horace Greeley and his 'Notion of Woman's Rights'"	December 2, 1869	Newspaper	The Revolution	Feminism and women's rights	Refutes Horace Greeley's views on the domestic sphere of women and the historical development of sexism; advocates mixed-sex education for children	
"More Masculine Reasoning — from the Pulpit"	December 2, 1869	Newspaper	The Revolution	Feminism and women's rights	Criticism of religious opposition to women's suffrage by Mark Trafton; advocates suffrage as a tool to fight the gender pay gap	
"What is the Meaning of This?"	December 9, 1869	Newspaper	The Revolution	Feminism and women's rights	Refutes remarks by William Lloyd Garrison at the November 1869 convention of the American Woman Suffrage Association in Cleveland, Ohio and expresses his sympathies for the alternative National Woman Suffrage Association	
"The New York 'Times'"	December 23, 1869	Newspaper	The Revolution	Feminism and women's rights	Refutes an editorial in The New York Times on the November 1869 convention of the American Woman Suffrage Association in Cleveland, Ohio and expresses his sympathies for the alternative National Woman Suffrage Association	
"Our Disinterred Ante-Diluvians"	December 30, 1869	Newspaper	The Revolution	Science	A report of Neal's visit to Albany, New York to see the Cardiff Giant; concludes the Giant to be a hoax	
"Lady Byron"	January 20, 1870	Newspaper	The Revolution	Literary criticism	Defends Harriet Beecher Stowe's characterization of Lady Byron in her article "The True Story of Lady Byron's Wife"	
"Portland Up, and Moving"	May 5, 1870	Newspaper	The Revolution	Feminism and women's rights	A report of Portland, Maine's first women's suffrage meeting, organized by Neal; republished in History of Woman Suffrage volume 3 (1886)	
"Progress in Maine"	May 12, 1870	Newspaper	The Revolution	Feminism and women's rights	A report of a women's suffrage meeting Neal organized in Portland, Maine; characterizes suffrage as a natural right already protected in the US Constitution	
Note on prayer	August 14, 1873	Newspaper	Portland Daily Press	Religion	A short article arguing that prayer must be accompanied by faith in its efficacy	
