= Isaac Clarke (disambiguation) =

Isaac Clarke is the main protagonist of the Dead Space video game series.

Isaac Clarke may also refer to:

- Isaac Clarke (publisher) (1824–1875), Welsh newspaper proprietor, printer and publisher
- Ike Clarke (1915–2002), English footballer and football manager
- Isaac Clarke Pray (1813–1869), American author and playwright.
