= John Harney =

John Harney may refer to:

- John Paul Harney, Canadian professor and politician
- John Hopkins Harney, American politician in Kentucky
- John Milton Harney, American physician and poet
- John Harney, founder of American tea company Harney & Sons
