= New York Enquirer =

The New York Enquirer has been the name of two unrelated newspapers published in New York City.

== 19th-century version ==
The New York Enquirer was founded in 1826 by Mordecai Noah. According to the masthead, it was "published every Tuesday and Friday at No. 1 Williams St., New York, New York". Noah was a strong supporter of Andrew Jackson and published often highly slanted pro-Jackson news reporting, along with international news.

By the early 1830s it had merged with a Whig paper to become the New York Courier and Enquirer.

== 20th-century version ==
Founded in 1926, as a Sunday weekly by William Randolph Hearst protégé William Griffin, the second New York Enquirer was charged with sedition in 1942 for its editorials opposing US involvement in World War II. It was sold in 1952, converted into a tabloid and subsequently renamed The National Enquirer; see that article for more information.
