= Horatio Hastings Weld =

American journalist

Horatio Hastings Weld (4 February 1811 – 27 August 1888) (commonly referred to as H. Hastings Weld) was an American author, newspaper editor and minister. In 1845 he became an Episcopal minister.

Weld was born in Boston, Massachusetts in 1811. In 1845, Weld was ordained a minister in the Episcopal Church. He would serve as rector of St. James Episcopal Church of Downingtown, Pennsylvania, Trinity Church of Moorestown, New Jersey and Christ Church of Riverton, New Jersey.

Weld's books include The Women of the Scriptures (1848); Life of Christ (1850); and Sacred and Poetical Quotations (1851).

Weld served as editor for several New York City periodicals, including Brother Jonathan, and the short-lived Evening Tattler. He also served as editor of the Boston-based newspaper the New England Galaxy, recruiting John Neal to co-edit the paper in 1835.

Weld died in Riverton in 1888.
