= John Rollin Tilton =

American painter

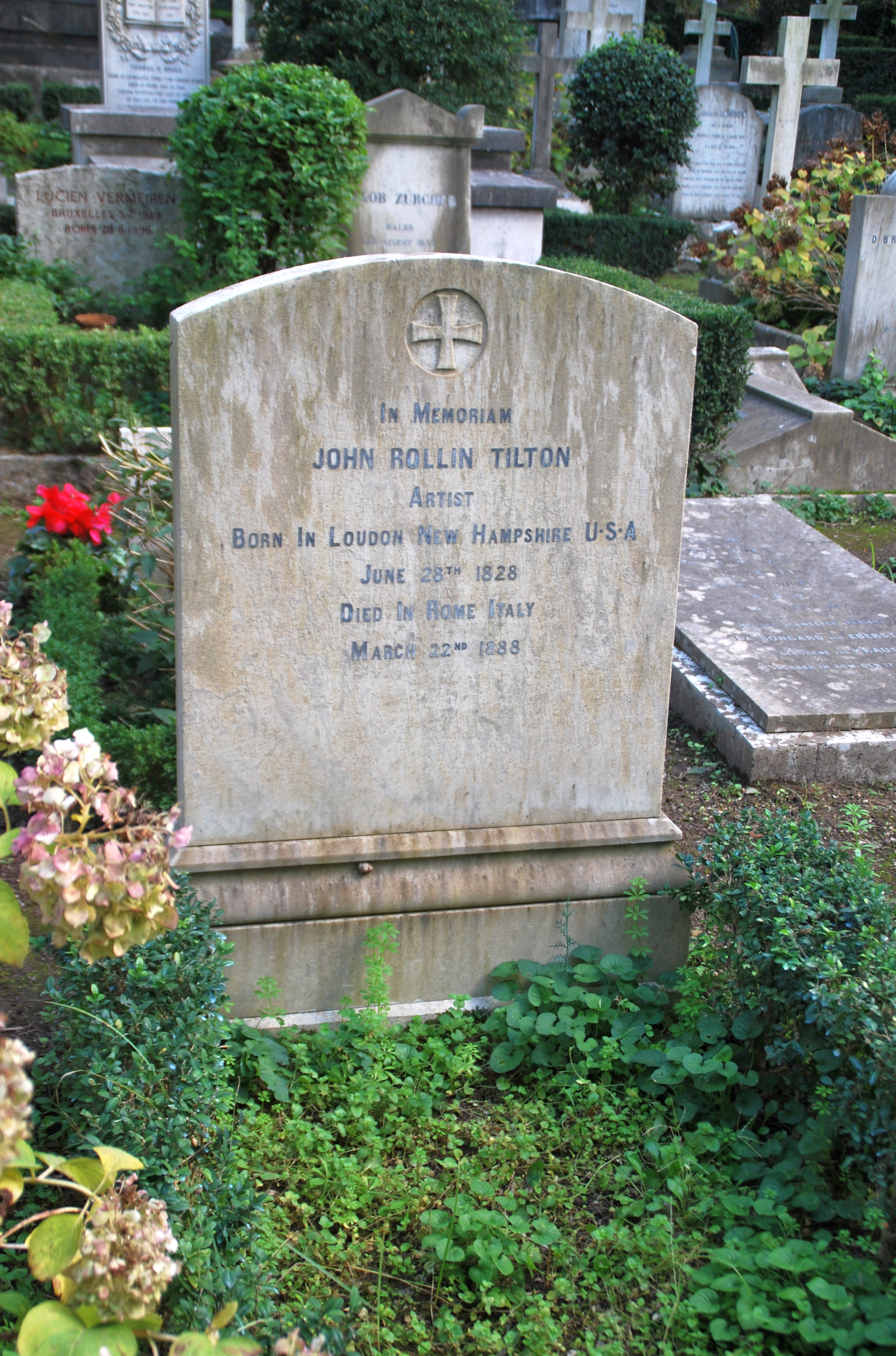
- J.R. Tilton's grave at the Cimitero acattolico, Rome
- Born: John Sargeant Rollin Tilton; 8 June 1828; New London, New Hampshire
- Died: 28 March 1888 (aged 59); Rome, Italy
- Resting place: Cimitero Acattolico, Rome
- Education: Florence, Rome
- Known for: Painter and illustrator
- Movement: Vedutisti
- Spouse: Caroline Town Stebbins (writer)

John Rollin Tilton (8 June 1828 – 28 March 1888) was an American painter, mainly of vedute of picturesque urban scenes.

== Biography ==
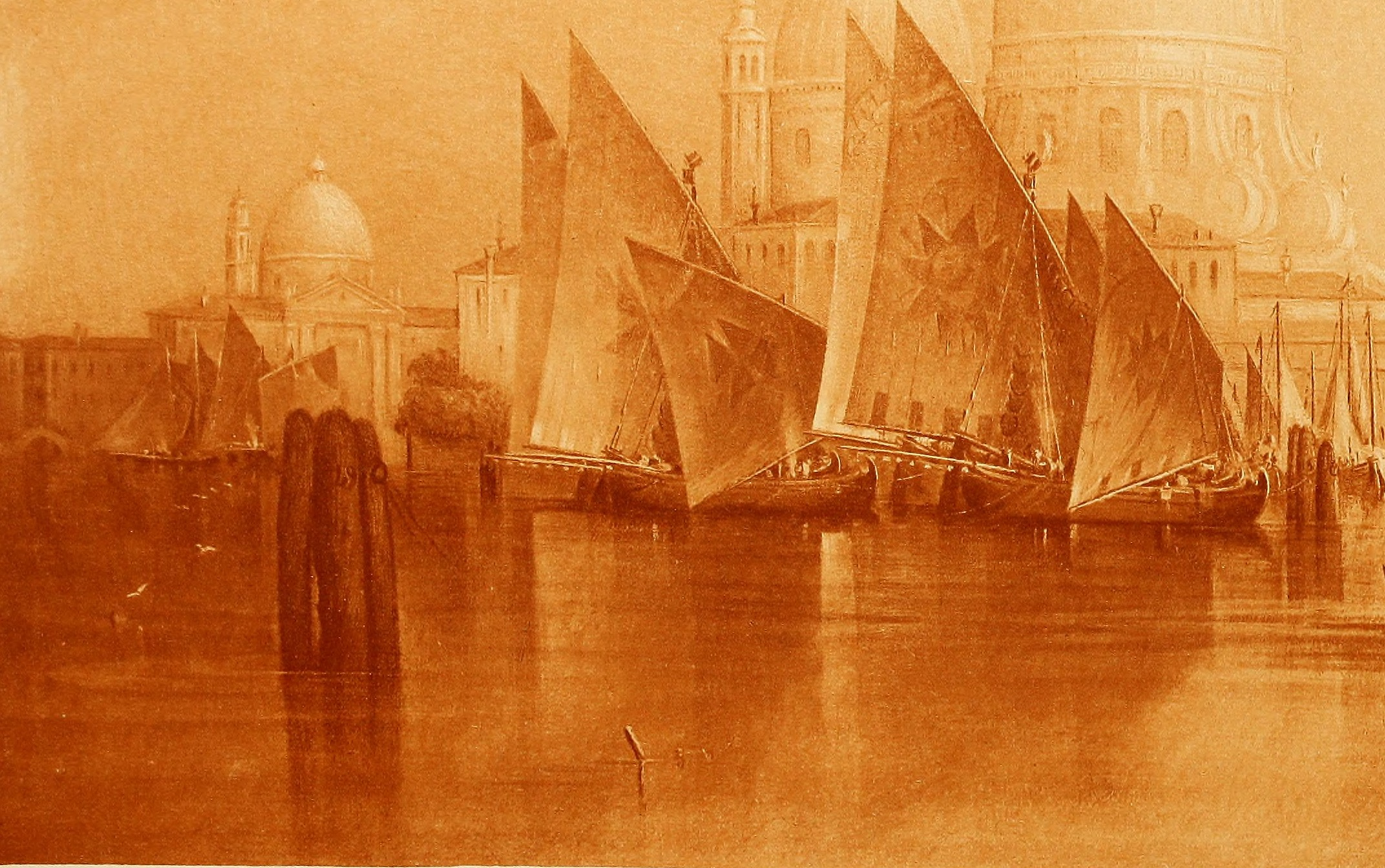
The Grand Canal, Venice, illustration in the book, American Art and American Art Collections: Essays on Artistic Subjects, 1889

He was born in New London, New Hampshire. He was initially self-taught, but then trained in Florence, and later in Rome, where he lived for many years initially making a living painting vedute and reproductions of masters. He painted a Rome from the Aventine, the Lagoon of Venice, The Egitto, and the Lago di Averno. The American statesman Hamilton Fish bought his Vallata Chamounix, and the American businessman W. B. Astor, his Lago di Thun; Louise, lady Ashburton, Dendur in Egypt and Paestum; the Boston mayor Martin Brimmer, his Lago di Como and Venice, and Count Palfy, his Vedute of Orvieto. De Gubernatis noted that "those who found Neapolitan vedute painters, warm and scintillating, would find Tilton cold and calm." He painted many watercolors.

Rollin Tilton and his wife, the writer and translator Caroline Town Stebbins, gathered a following among émigrés and visitors from the English speaking world. Among them were John Ruskin and Henry James.
