= The New World (American newspaper) =

The New World was a weekly newspaper in New York, New York, in the United States, published from October 26, 1839, to May 1845 by Jonas Winchester. The paper was founded and edited by Park Benjamin Sr. It billed itself as an apolitical "family newspaper", featuring British and American literature and religious discourses. The paper's masthead read: "No pent-up Utica contracts our powers; The whole unbounded Continent is ours!", a quote originally attributed to Jonathan M. Sewall from his epilogue to Cato, a Tragedy in 1778.

Notable contributions include:

- Charles Dickens' Barnaby Rudge, reprinted in 1841 in weekly installments after its original appearance in Master Humphrey's Clock.
- Thomas Carlyle's six-part lecture series On Heroes, Hero-Worship, and The Heroic in History, printed in 1841.
- Thomas Moore's "Fifteen Songs," a collection of unpublished songs published in 1841, which were later released in The Poetical Works of Thomas Moore.
- Anna Cora Mowatt's complete play, Gulzara or The Persian Slave: 1 drama in Five Acts, in 1841.
- E.P. Hurlbut's "The Rights of Woman," later published in his work, Essays on Human Rights and their Political Guaranties in 1845. Hurlbut knew Elizabeth Cady Stanton and the Declaration of Sentiments from the Seneca Falls Convention in 1848 follows many of the examples set forth in "The Rights of Woman."
- G.P.R. James' complete novels, The Jacquerie and Morley Ernstein; or, The Tenants of the Heart, both published in extra editions in 1842.
- Sarah Stickney Ellis' complete novel, Summer and Winter in the Pyrenees.
