= Park Benjamin Sr. =

American poet

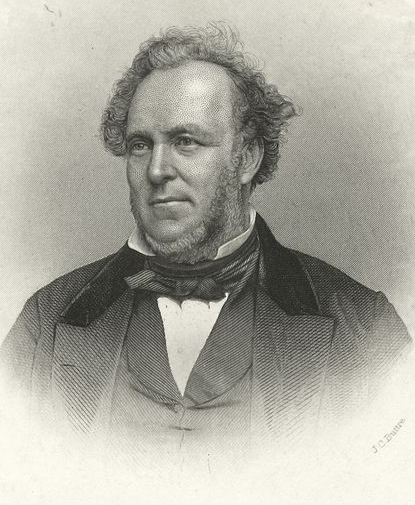
Engraving of Park Benjamin

Park Benjamin Sr. (August 14, 1809 – September 12, 1864) was well known in his time as an American poet, journalist, editor and founder of several newspapers.

== Biography ==
He was born in Demerara, British Guiana, August 14, 1809, but was early sent to New England, and graduated from Trinity College, Hartford, Conn. He practiced law in Boston, but abandoned it for editorial work there and later in New York.

On July 8, 1839, he joined with Rufus Wilmot Griswold to produce The Evening Tattler, a journal which promised "the sublimest songs of the great poets–the eloquence of the most renowned orators–the heart-entrancing legends of love and chivalry–the laughter-loving jests of all lands". In addition to fiction and poetry, it also published foreign news, local gossip, jokes, and New York police reports. In 1840 Benjamin helped to found The New World and after other brief editorial ventures became a lecturer, public reader, and periodical writer. He was sued for libel by James Fenimore Cooper, and was on personal terms with Oliver Wendell Holmes Sr., Henry Wadsworth Longfellow, Nathaniel Hawthorne and Edgar Allan Poe.

By the time his first son, Park Benjamin Jr., was born, he had settled down to quiet retirement in Long Island. His son went on to become a writer as well as a patent lawyer and physician. Benjamin died, after a brief illness, on September 12, 1864.

== Criticism ==
Edgar Allan Poe had mixed feelings about Benjamin, calling his writing "lucid, terse, and pungent" and his character "witty, often cuttingly sarcastic, but seldom humorous". Walt Whitman, for a time one of Benjamin's employees and protégés, hated his poetry outright. In the 20th century, Park Benjamin Sr. was virtually forgotten. He is now known only through his shorter poems, of which "The Old Sexton" is often anthologized.
