= Ladies' Magazine =

Defunct American women's magazine

The Ladies' Magazine, an early women's magazine, was first published in 1828 in Boston, Massachusetts. Also known as Ladies' Magazine and Literary Gazette and later as American Ladies' Magazine, it was designed to be American, and named to separate itself from the Lady's Magazine of London. The magazine was founded by Reverend John Lauris Blake, Congregational minister and headmaster of the Cornhill School for Young Ladies, who desired to set a model for American womanhood.

It is thought to have been the first magazine to be edited by a woman; from 1828 until 1836, its editor was Sarah Josepha Hale. As editor, Hale hoped she could aid in the education of women, as she wrote, "not that they may usurp the situation, or encroach on the prerogatives of man; but that each individual may lend her aid to the intellectual and moral character of those within her sphere".

Ladies' Magazine was acquired by Louis Antoine Godey in 1836. In 1837 it merged with the Lady's Book and Magazine published in Philadelphia by Godey and better known by its later name, Godey's Lady's Book. Hale moved from Boston to Philadelphia to edit the new, combined magazine.
