= Brother Jonathan (newspaper) =

American newspaper

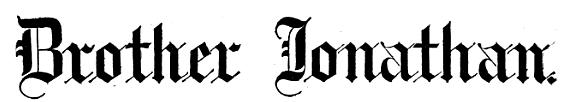
- Type: Weekly literary newspaper
- Founded: 1839/1842
- Ceased publication: 1862
- Headquarters: Manhattan, New York City
- OCLC number: 9439488

Brother Jonathan was a weekly publication operated by Benjamin Day from 1842 to 1862, and was the first weekly illustrated publication in the United States.

== History ==
Benjamin Day founded the first penny newspaper in the United States, The New York Sun, in 1833. He sold the paper to his brother-in-law, Moses Yale Beach, in 1838.

After trying a few other publishing ventures, in 1842 Day formed a partnership with James G. Wilson to publish the weekly Brother Jonathan in quarto format, focusing on reprinting English fiction (where no royalties were paid to the authors). However, the exact origins of the publication are a bit more complex, as Rufus Wilmot Griswold and Park Benjamin, Sr., who started the Evening Tattler in 1839, started publishing Brother Jonathan in folio format in July 1839, and it appears that Day and Wilson soon took over those publications. The January 1, 1842 edition of Brother Jonathan is still listed as Volume 1, No. 1, despite the prior issues.

In May 1843, Ann S. Stephens and her husband purchased the paper and invited critic and activist John Neal to become chief editor. During his term as editor, which lasted for the rest of that year, he used Brother Jonathan to publish his most influential statement on women's rights, the Rights of Women speech, as well as articles and short stories that argued for suffrage, property rights, equal pay, and better workplace conditions for women. The History of Woman Suffrage remembered that "Mr. Neal's lecture, published in The Brother Jonathan, was extensively copied, and ... had a wide, silent influence, preparing the way for action. It was a scathing satire, and men felt the rebuke."

Brother Jonathan became popular throughout the United States, and reportedly grew to a circulation of between 60–70,000.

The title was a reference to Brother Jonathan, a common cultural reference (at the time) to a fictional character personifying New England, similar in appearance to Uncle Sam. While editor, Neal argued in the publication for Brother Jonathan to be the national emblem of the US. Almost two decades earlier in 1825 he had published a novel of the same name also in reference to the same fictional character.

Day kept the annual subscription price at $1 throughout the publication's existence, but stopped publishing in 1862 as paper prices rose, returning subscription fees with a note that he "would not publish a paper that could not be circulated for $1 a year."
