= Robert Matthew Sully =

American portrait painter

- Born: 17 July 1803; Petersburg, Virginia
- Died: 28 October 1855 (aged 52); Buffalo, New York
- Occupation: Portrait painter

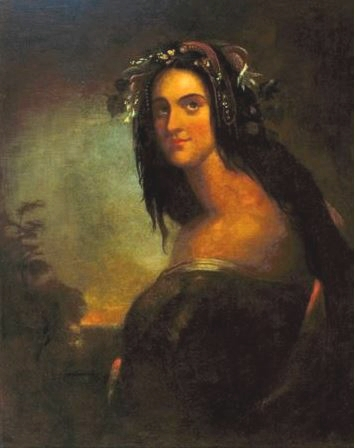
Pocahontas (c.1850)

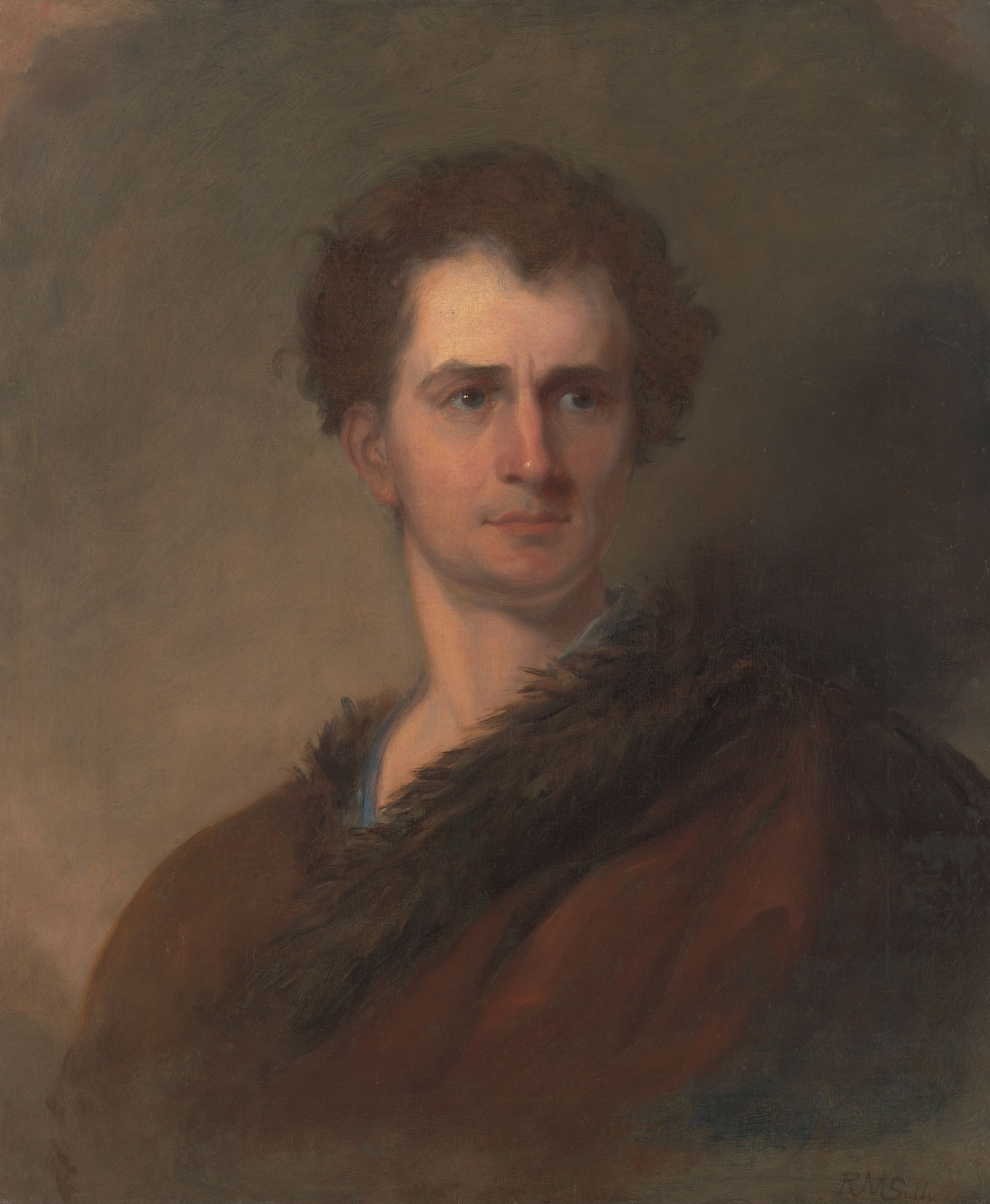
Junius Brutus Booth (c. 1830)

Robert Matthew Sully (17 July 1803, Petersburg, Virginia - 28 October 1855, Buffalo, New York) was an American portrait painter who worked mostly in Virginia. He is best remembered for his depictions of Native Americans. The famous English-born painter, Thomas Sully, was his uncle.

== Biography ==
He was one of six children born to Matthew Sully (1773-1812) and his wife, Elizabeth (1775-1851), who was from Scotland. He was sent to school in Richmond, where he met and became lifelong friends with Edgar Allan Poe. By the age of eighteen, he was determined to become a painter and went to Philadelphia to seek advice from his uncle, Thomas Sully.

His uncle's advice was to study in London at the Royal Academy. While there, he became acquainted with Jeremy Bentham and produced some sketches which are now at Harvard University. In 1828, he returned to the United States and settled in Richmond. Four years later, he married Isabella Thompson (1815-1898) of Culpeper, Virginia. They had one son and two daughters. The marriage was apparently not a happy one as, by the mid 1840s, they were living apart.

In the early 1850s, he painted a number of portraits, many of Native Americans, for the State Historical Society of Wisconsin; a project commissioned by Lyman C. Draper. In 1855, he was elected an honorary member of that society and set out for Wisconsin to pay a visit, accept the honor and perhaps settle there. He died en route, in Buffalo. His baggage and most of his personal papers were lost at the time. Due to that and other unknown circumstances, a certain Frank Short was arrested and charged with his murder, but was released when it was determined that Sully's death was from natural causes.

He painted two portraits of his friend Poe, but their whereabouts are currently unknown.
