= Grenville Mellen =

American lawyer

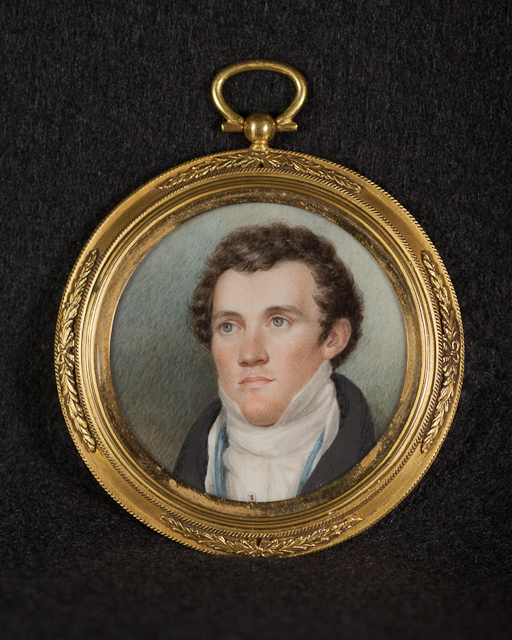
- Born: June 19, 1799; Biddeford, Massachusetts, US
- Died: September 5, 1841 (aged 42); New York City, US
- Father: Prentiss Mellen
- Writing career
- Genres: poetry satire
- Notable work: The Martyr's Triumph: Buried Valley and Other Poems

Grenville Mellen (June 19, 1799 – September 5, 1841) was an American poet and lawyer, and the eldest son of Supreme Court Chief-Justice Prentiss Mellen.

== Biography ==
Grenville Mellen, born June 19, 1799, in Biddeford, Massachusetts (which became part of Maine in 1820) was the son of Supreme Court Chief-Justice Prentiss Mellen. He graduated from Harvard University in 1818, thereafter entering the field of law, and studied law with his father before being admitted to the bar. During this time, he married and settled in North Yarmouth, Maine, in 1823, to practice law. In October 1828, his wife died and in the spring of 1829 so did his only child. It is remarked that after the death of his wife and child, his character was changed: "He had before been an ambitious and a happy man. The remainder of his life was clouded with melancholy." Following these losses, he moved to Boston.

During his time in Boston, he wrote poetry for various journals, including the United States Literary Gazette, and began publishing satires, prose, and poetry. Five years later, he moved to New York, where he resided until summer of 1840.

Due to declining health, he then moved to Cuba. Unsatisfied with the results of the warmer climate, he moved back to New York during the spring of 1841. He died of the disease then known as consumption in New York City September 5, 1841.

== Reception ==
Mellen was a prolific writer, especially known amongst contemporaneous 19th century literati. His work received mixed reviews. Rufus Wilmot Griswold remarks in The Poets and Poetry of America (1842):

As a poet, he enjoyed a higher reputation in his lifetime than his works will preserve. They are without vigour of thought or language, and are often dreamy, mystic, and unintelligible. In his writings there is no evidence of creative genius; no original, clear, and manly thought; no spirited and natural descriptions of life or nature; no humour, no pathos, no passion; nothing that appeals to the common sympathies of mankind.

In A Chapter on Autography (1841), Edgar Allan Poe, another contemporary writer, describes Mellen as being "flighty, hyper-fanciful", and as having "unsettled and often erroneous ideas of the beautiful". Furthermore, he states, "Mr. Mellen has genius unquestionably, but there is something in his temperament which obscures it."

Editor Michael Laird Simmons exclaims (1875), "A glance at his poems shows a delicate susceptibility to poetical impression, tinged with an air of melancholy."

== Selected works ==
- The Rest of the Nations: A Poem (1826)
- Our Chronicle of '26: A Satirical Poem (1827)
- Sad Tales and Glad Tales, as by Reginald Reverie (1828)
- The Martyr's Triumph: Buried Valley; and Other poems (1833)
- A Book of the United States: Exhibiting Its Geography, Divisions, Constitution, and Government, credited as editor (1839)
