= Ann S. Stephens =

American novelist (1810–1886)

Ann Sophia Stephens
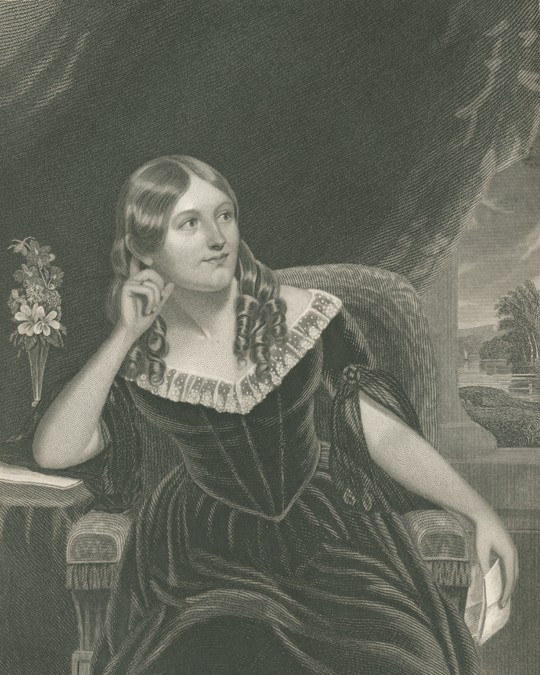
- Stephens, circa 1844
- Born: Ann Sophia Winterbotham; March 30, 1810
- Died: August 20, 1886 (aged 76); Newport, Rhode Island
- Other name: Jonathan Slick
- Occupations: Editor; writer; humorist

Ann Sophia Stephens (née Winterbotham; March 10, 1810 – August 20, 1886) was an American novelist and magazine editor. She was the author of dime novels and is credited as the progenitor of that genre.

== Early life and family ==
Ann Sophia Winterbotham was born on March 30, 1810, in Derby, Connecticut; she was the daughter of Ann and John Winterbotham, son of William Winterbotham. He was the manager of a woolen mill owned by Col. David Humphreys. Her mother died early and she was brought up by her mother's sister, who eventually became her stepmother. She was educated at a dame school in South Britain, Connecticut, and started writing at an early age. She married Edward Stephens, a printer from Plymouth, Massachusetts, in 1831 and they relocated to Portland, Maine.

The actress Clara Bloodgood was the daughter of their son, Edward Stephens, a well known New York lawyer.

== Career ==
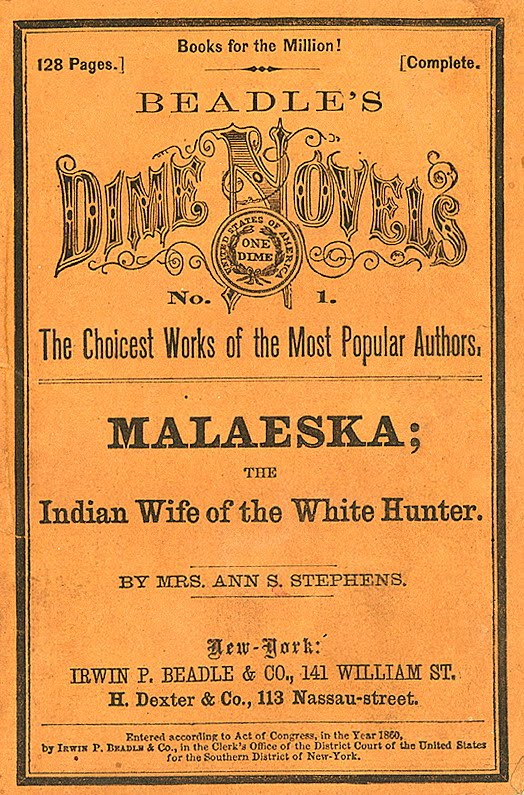
Cover of Malaeska, the Indian Wife of the White Hunter (1860)

Edward established a grocery business in Portland. When it failed, Stephens and her husband co-founded Portland Magazine, with herself as editor and him as publisher. Author and critic John Neal, whom she met shortly after her arrival in Portland, mentored her in this undertaking. The magazine was a monthly literary periodical where some of her early work first appeared. They sold it in 1837.

When Edward secured an appointment at a New York City custom house, the couple moved to that city. Stephens garnered influence in New York literary circles and took on editorial positions with a number of the city's periodicals. She became editor of The Ladies Companion and adopted the humorous pseudonym Jonathan Slick. Over the next few years she wrote more than twenty-five serial novels plus short stories and poems for several well known periodicals which included Godey's Lady's Book and Graham's Magazine. In 1843, she and her husband purchased the Brother Jonathan literary journal and hired Neal to serve as editor. Her first novel Fashion and Famine was published in 1854. She started her own magazine Mrs Stephens' Illustrated New Monthly in 1856, it was published by her husband. The magazine merged with Peterson's Magazine a few years later.

The term "dime novel" originated with Stephens's Malaeska, the Indian Wife of the White Hunter, printed in the first book in Beadle & Adams's Beadle’s Dime Novels series, dated June 9, 1860. The novel was a reprint of Stephens's earlier serial that appeared in the Ladies' Companion magazine in February, March, and April 1839. Later, the Grolier Club listed Malaeska as the most influential book of 1860. Some of her other work includes High Life in New York (1843), Alice Copley: A Tale of Queen Mary's Time (1844), The Diamond Necklace and Other Tale (1846), The Old Homestead (1855), The Rejected Wife (1863) and A Noble Woman (1871).

== Works ==
- Alice Copley: A Tale of Queen Mary's Time
- A Noble Woman
- Bellehood and Bondage
- Bertha's Engagement
- The Curse of Gold, 1869
- The Diamond Necklace and Other Tale
- The Deserted Wife
- Doubly False
- Fashion and Famine 1854
- The Gold Brick, 1866
- The Gulf Between Them
- The Heiress of Greenhurst: An autobiography, 1857
- High Life in New York, 1873
- Katharine Allen; or, The Gold Brick
- The Ladies' Complete Guide to Crochet, Fancy Knitting, and Needlework, 1854
- Lord Hope's Choice
- Mabel's Mistake, 1868
- Malaeska, the Indian Wife of the White Hunter, 1860
- Married in Haste
- Mary Derwent: A Tale of Wyoming and Mohawk Valleys, 1858
- Myra: The Child of Adoption, 1860
- A Noble Woman, 1871
- Norston's Rest, 1877
- The Old Countess, 1873
- The Old Homestead, 1855
- Palaces and Prisons
- Phemie Frost's Experiences, 1874
- Pictorial History of the War for the Union, vol.1 1863, vol.2 1866
- The Portland Sketch Book, 1836
- The Reigning Belle, 1885
- The Rejected Wife
- Ruby Gray's Strategy
- Silent Struggles, 1865
- The Soldiers' Orphans
- Sybil Chase; or, The Valley Ranche, 1861
- The Wife's Secret
- Wives and Widows, 1869
- The Lady Mary
