= Lionel Lincoln =

1825 novel by James Fenimore Cooper

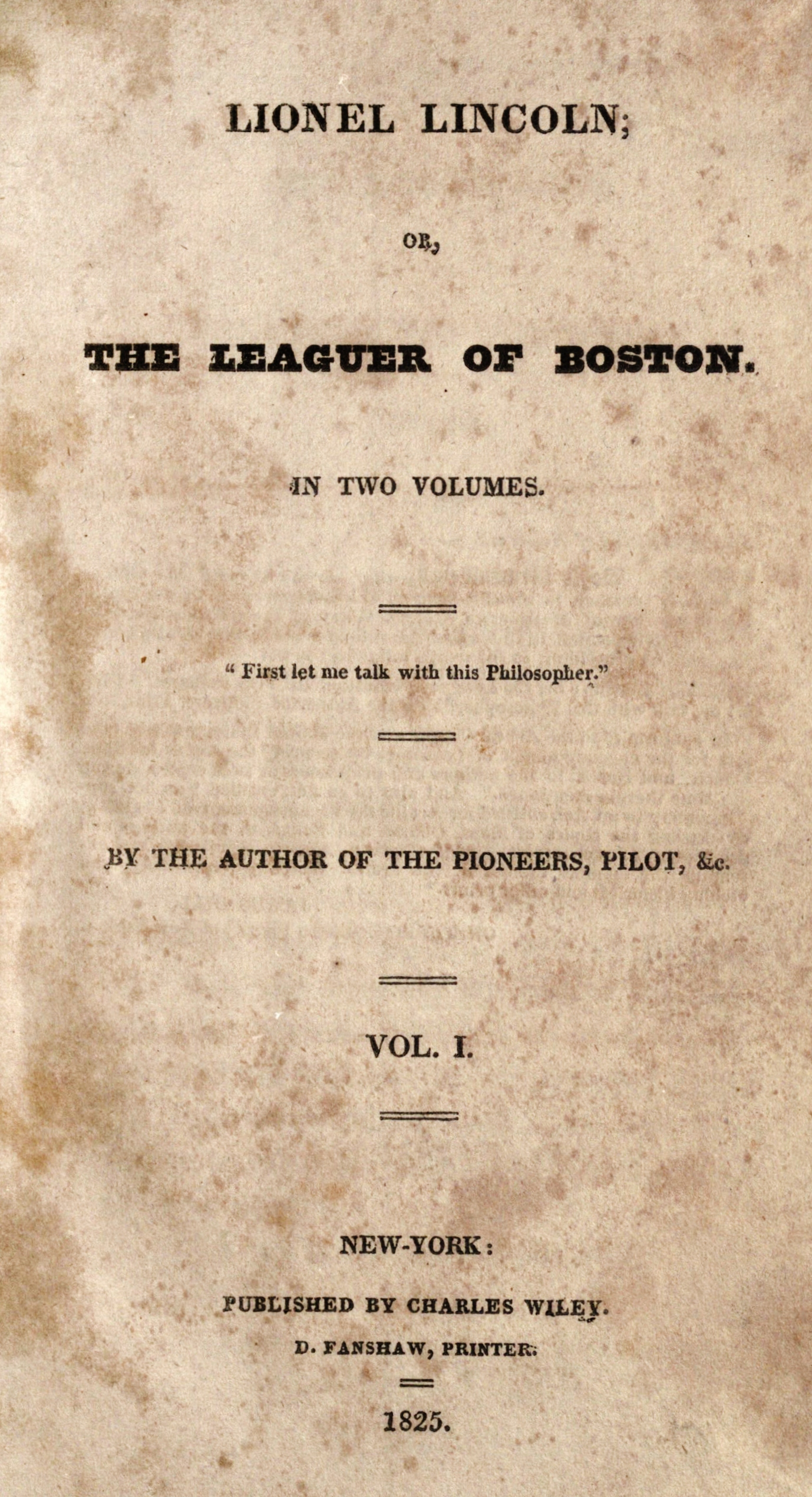
- First edition title page
- Author: James Fenimore Cooper
- Language: English
- Genre: Historical fiction
- Publication date: 1825

Lionel Lincoln is a historical novel by James Fenimore Cooper, first published in 1825. Set in the American Revolutionary War, the novel follows Lionel Lincoln, a Boston-born American of British noble descent who goes to England and returns a British soldier, and is forced to deal with the split loyalties in his family and friends to the American colonies and the British homeland. At the end of the novel, he returns to England with his wife Cecil, another American born cousin.

The novel was originally conceived as part of a 13 volume series of historical novels by Cooper; however, he was generally dissatisfied with his work as a historical novelist. Both contemporary and modern critics regard the novel as one of the poorest novels written by Cooper.

== Background ==
After the success of The Spy: A Tale of the Neutral Ground, The Pioneers, and The Pilot: A Tale of the Sea, Cooper intended to try his hand at historical fiction with a series of 13 novels called Legends of the Thirteen Republics, wishing to reflect on the role of each colony in the revolution in each novel. However, Lionel Lincoln was the first and last of the novels to be written and published. Generally, Cooper was disappointed with the reception of his novel by the American audience and dissatisfied with his first attempt at historical fiction.

== Characters ==
=== List ===
- Lionel Lincoln – British Major, Protagonist of the novel
- Sir Lionel Lincoln – Father of Lionel Lincoln, who is in asylum, due to the cunningness of his relatives
- Ralph – Strange and Moody Old Man
- Job Prey – Simple minded boy, retarded son
- Mrs. Priscilla Lechmere – Lincoln’s Great Aunt
- Abigail Prey – Job Pray’s Mother and Friend of Mrs. Pricilla
- Cecil Dynevor – Pricilla’s Grand Daughter, Mother of Agnes Danforth
- Agnes Danforth – Great-niece of Mrs. Priscilla Lechmere, Daughter of Cecil Dynevor
- Colonel Dynevor – Father Agnes Danforth.
- Captain Peter Polwarth – Good Natured Man, Friend of Lincoln
- M’Fuse – Friend of Lincoln, Professional Soldier who interested in warfare.
- Seth Sage – Landlord
- General Gage – Commander in Chief
- General Clinton
- General Burgoyne
- Rev. Dr. Liturgy – Anglican Rector of King’s Chapel

== Analysis ==
Both Lionel Lincoln and his eventual American bride, Cecil, are descended from the British nobility. For Cooper and his American audience, their roots represented the perceived corruption and promiscuousness of aristocracy compared to republicanism in the United States. Though the novel was supposed to be about American republicanism and the praising the American revolution, the titular character Lincoln and his wife return to Britain at the end of the war. One major theme is whether Lincoln will in fact be moved to join the American cause. Throughout the novel, he is repeatedly given arguments of reason to favour the American cause over the Crown. But as critic Donald Donnell points out, the obstinate loyalty to the Crown which results in Lincoln's return to England at the end of the war, seems to be a deliberately negative trait with which Cooper endows many of Loyalist characters. In his dissertation, Paul Jonathan Woolf examines the effect the decision for these aristocratic characters to leave the United States at the end of the novel:

Arguably, though, Cooper wrote himself into a corner. To keep Lionel and Cecil in America would have had disturbing implications. If Lionel and Cecil, whose own branch of the Lincoln family is tainted by her grandmother’s diabolical scheming, remained in America, the new nation would not be rid of what Cooper depicts as the endemic insanity, sexual deviancy and deceit of the English aristocracy. Furthermore, to invest in Lionel and Cecil the leadership of the new republic would raise some unsettling political questions... for Cecil and Lionel to become leaders in the United States would surely risk blurring the line between natural and titled aristocracy; they would here be one and the same.

=== Genre ===
Joseph Steinbrink called Lionel Lincoln Cooper's "first and ultimately his only strict attempt at historical fiction". According to Steinbrink, Cooper was one of the few early American authors who appreciated the early history of the United States, and saw that the American Revolution was really the gem which Americans could enjoy, if there were to be historical novels. However, the generally poor reception of the novel by contemporaries led to Cooper being dissatisfied with the genre of historical fiction, believing that the American literary audience was not yet ready to explore the Historical fiction genre. According to Steinbrink, however, the novel's failure resulted from Cooper's inability to integrate character and plot development into the history of the American Revolution.

=== King Lear ===
Scholar W.B. Gates strongly links the plot of Lionel Lincoln to that "King Lear," emphasizing the similarity between Lionel Lincoln's plot and that surrounding the Duke Gloucester. He compares the plot of the two:

Both Lionel Lincoln and the Gloucester plot involve a distinguished gentleman who has an illegitimate son; in the play the son (Edmund) proves to be a villain; in the novel the son (Job Pray) proves to be a half-witted creature who embodies many of the traits of Lear's Fool. Similarly to the Fool, he attaches himself to a man whom he likes but whom he chides unmercifully (Major Lincoln, his half-brother). In each story, the distinguished gentleman later has a legitimate son of noble character whom circumstances place in opposition to his father. In the play, Edgar is wrongly accused of plotting against his father and is forced to flee; in the novel, Major Lincoln is a British officer, whereas his father is an ardent (though mad) supporter of the colonists.

== Critical reception ==
Contemporary critics of Cooper had a decidedly negative reception of Lionel Lincoln. Critic John Neal was very disappointed, writing in American Writers: "It is not such a book, as we might have, and shall have, we do hope yet; a brave, hearty, original book, brimful of descriptive truth-of historical and familiar truth; crowded with real American character; alive with American peculiarities; got up after no model, however excellent; wove [sic] to no pattern, however beautiful; in imitation of nobody, however great." To Neal, Lionel Lincoln was an unrealistic imitation of the Scottish historical novelist Sir Walter Scott, and was completely unsatisfactory.

Modern critic Joseph Steinbrink points out that the historical retelling of battles and events by Cooper is very good, but that this is obscured by both a very weak character of Lionel Lincoln and too much "gothicism and sentimentality". Steinbrink suggests that Cooper may have concentrated too hard on researching the historical information, rendering the art of storytelling unduly hard, because the knowledge of the American Revolution didn't come naturally to him.
