= New York Courier and Enquirer =

Daily newspaper in New York (1829-1861)

- Type: Daily newspaper
- Format: Broadsheet
- Publisher: James Watson Webb
- Founded: June 1829
- Ceased publication: June 1861
- Political alignment: Whig Party
- Headquarters: New York
- OCLC number: 9348981

The New York Courier and Enquirer, properly called the Morning Courier and New-York Enquirer, was a daily broadsheet newspaper published in New York City from June 1829 until June 1861, when it was merged into the New York World. Throughout its existence it was edited by newspaper publisher James Watson Webb. It was closely connected with the rise and fall of the United States Whig Party, and was noted for its careful coverage of New York Harbor shipping news and its close attention to speeches and events in the United States Congress.

== History ==
=== Growth ===
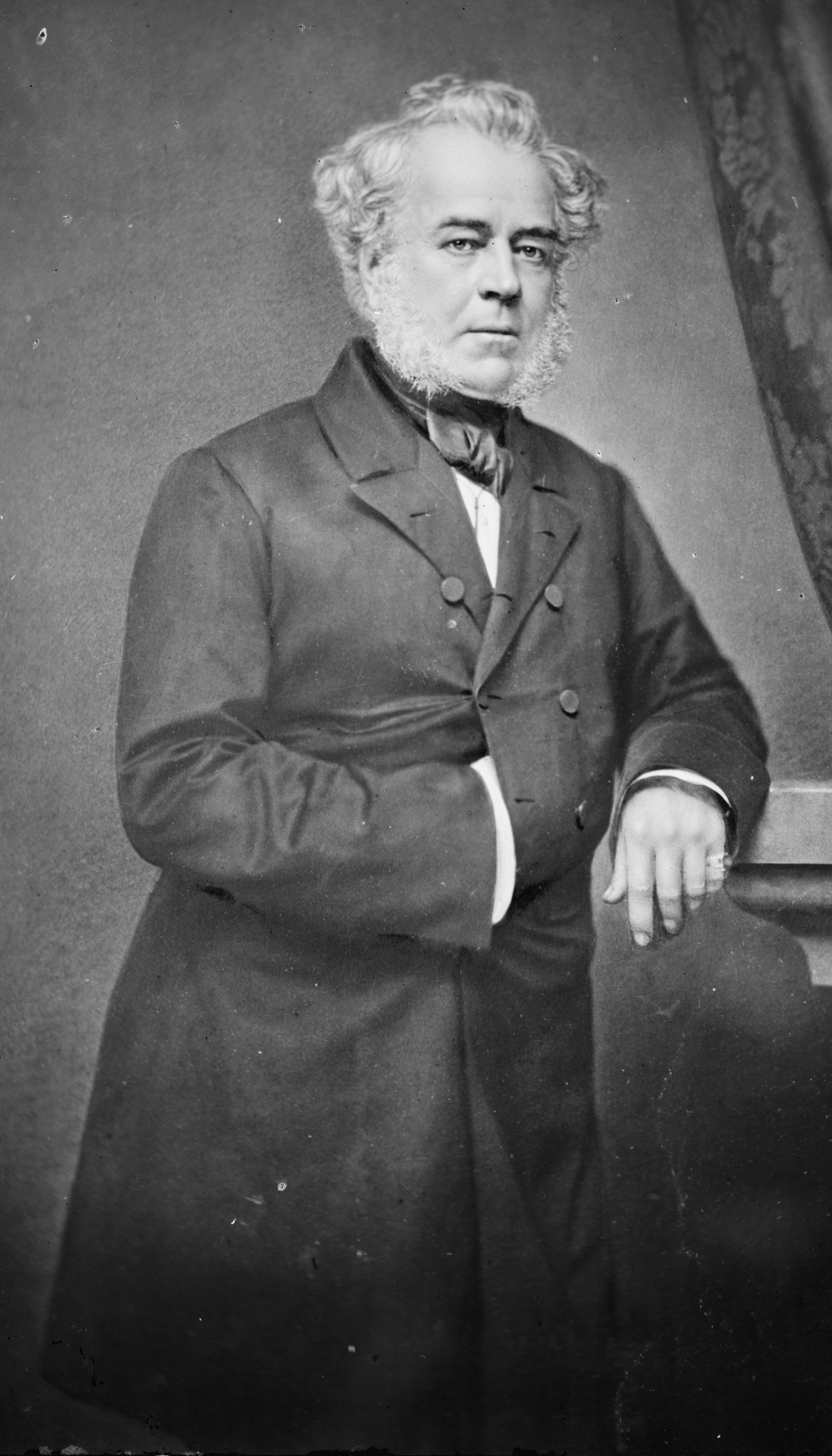
James Watson Webb, publisher

The Courier and Enquirer was based upon the merger of two pre-existing newspapers, Webb's New York Morning Courier (1827) and Mordecai Noah's New-York Enquirer. After Webb purchased the Enquirer in 1829, he merged the two Manhattan-based news sheets to form the Morning Courier and New-York Enquirer, usually called simply the Courier and Enquirer. At that time a partisan supporter of newly elected President Andrew Jackson, Webb ran his newspaper in the interest of what was becoming the Democratic Party. He hired young journalist James Gordon Bennett, Sr. to be his associate editor.

By the 1830s, Bennett's and Webb's Courier and Enquirer had developed a crack reportorial system for gathering news from New York-based ships and from Washington, D.C. The paper was able to compile the resources necessary to set up a pioneering pony express system to carry dispatches from the U.S. Capitol. In one 1830 coup, the Courier and Enquirer obtained the text of Jackson's annual message to Congress in only 27.5 hours.

However, New York's growing business community felt increasing dislike for Jackson's populism. As a member of this class and social network, Webb was pulled away from his old ties—and attracted towards the political circle around Webb's new friend, federal senator Henry Clay. Clay, although he was from Kentucky, was taking the lead in defense of New York's growing banking sector against attacks from Jacksonians.

=== Whig Party ===
Newspaper competition played a role in the accelerating movement of the Courier and Enquirer away from Jacksonianism. One of its chief rival papers, the New York Evening Post, was edited by Webb's rival William Leggett. Leggett, who was allied with Jackson's New York political lieutenant Martin Van Buren, edited the Evening Post to be hostile to banks and the New York financial sector. Webb and the Courier and Enquirer sensed an opportunity to create an anti-Jackson newspaper with a national reach. In a key sign of this split, in 1832 associate editor Bennett left the Courier and Enquirer to start his own Democratic paper, the New York Herald.

By 1834 Webb, Clay, and the East Coast financial industry had joined hands to form a new, nationwide political party. While its party machinery was based on Clay's National Republican Party, the new name for the political gathering, the Whig Party, was coined by Webb, who became the young party's chief media proprietor. The Courier and Enquirer thus became a key element in the United States's Second Party System, in which the Democratic Party and the Whig Party confronted each other during the decades prior to the American Civil War. A standard history of New York states that during the 1830s, the Courier and Enquirer was "the largest and most powerful paper in the United States."

Democrats considered Webb to be a disloyal traitor to their side, and responded to the Courier and Enquirer's news coverage with great bitterness. In 1837–1838, Democrats in Congress made floor speeches that attacked the Courier and Enquirer with such ferocity that one of Clay's Kentucky allies, congressman William J. Graves, challenged a critic of the Courier and Enquirer, Maine Democratic lawmaker Jonathan Cilley, to a duel. Their personal combat, which began with editorials in the Courier and Enquirer and speeches on the U.S. House floor, ended with Cilley's death.

=== Decline ===
Like other United States newspapers of the era, the Courier and Enquirer was not founded as a provider of up-to-the-minute information. Its pages tended to be filled with the texts of letters written on paper and physically delivered to the editor from distant locations (from where we get our word for a newspaper reporter, "correspondent"), and partisan editorials.

The successful operation of an American electrical telegraph in 1844 created a paradigm shift in American newspapering. Soon the Morse lines reached New York City, and Webb's competitors, headed by rival Whig editor Horace Greeley, proved to be more adept in adapting to the new technology and publishing daily newspapers filled with fresh news. Webb grew increasingly uninterested in his journalistic duties, and began, starting in 1849, to trawl for appointment as a United States ambassador or to some other post that would grant him the social status he wanted.

As the Courier and Enquirer ceased to be a cutting-edge newspaper, the Whig Party also declined. In line with the ties of many New York merchants to the U.S. South and its slaveholding community, the Courier and Enquirer had always supported American slavery. The paper's coverage of African Americans was extremely hostile, marked by prejudice and bigotry. While this kind of coverage was little problem for the newspaper in the 1830s and 1840s, the growth of free soil and even abolitionist sentiment throughout the Northern states in the 1850s made the Courier and Enquirer look archaic. Meanwhile, the Whigs, torn apart by the growing slavery crisis, could not field a candidate for the U.S. presidency in 1856. Many New York Whigs joined the new Republican Party.

In 1861, Webb's fellow former Whig, Abraham Lincoln, became U.S. President; but the new chief executive had little use for the aging newspaper. Lincoln appointed Webb first to be U.S. minister to Turkey, which he declined, and then minister to Brazil, an appointment that he accepted. Both countries were far away from New York City. The newly named diplomat consolidated the Courier and Enquirer into the new, rival newspaper, the New York World, which carried on the Courier and Enquirer's racist coverage. As the World was a Democratic paper, the partisan history of the Courier and Enquirer had revolved through a full circle. As former editor Webb sailed southward in 1861 to take on his new job, the Courier and Enquirer ceased publication forever.

== Today ==
The Courier and Enquirer's close coverage of three U.S. Senate opponents of Andrew Jackson, namely Henry Clay, John C. Calhoun, and Daniel Webster, is credited with enlarging the reputation of these three men into key figures of the Second Party System or antebellum period of U.S. history, and eventually to their reputation as members of the Great Triumvirate.

A microfilm file of the New York Courier and Enquirer from its June 16, 1829 startup until its June 29, 1861 dissolution can be found on the shelves of the New York State Library under the title Morning Courier and New-York Enquirer.

A similar file, marked "incomplete", can be found in the New York Public Library under the title Morning Courier and New York Enquirer.

== Bibliography ==
- Campbell, Stephen W. (2019). The Bank War and the Partisan Press: Newspapers, Financial Institutions, and the Post Office in Jacksonian America. Lawrence, Kan.: University Press of Kansas. ISBN 978-0-7006-2744-8.
