= Brother Jonathan =

Personification of New England

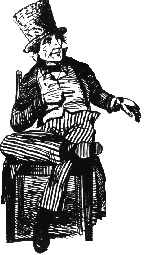
Brother Jonathan from an 1852 political cartoon

Brother Jonathan is the personification of New England. He was also used as an emblem of the United States in general, and can be an allegory of capitalism. His too-short pants, too-tight waistcoat and old-fashioned style reflect his taste for inexpensive, second-hand products and efficient use of means.

Brother Jonathan soon became a stock fictional character, developed as a good-natured parody of all New England during the early American Republic. He was widely popularized by the weekly newspaper Brother Jonathan and the humor magazine Yankee Notions.

Brother Jonathan was usually depicted in editorial cartoons and patriotic posters outside New England as a long-winded New Englander who dressed in striped trousers, somber black coat and stove-pipe hat. Inside New England, "Brother Jonathan" was depicted as an enterprising and active businessman who blithely boasted of Yankee conquests for the Universal Yankee Nation.

After 1865, the garb of Brother Jonathan was emulated by Uncle Sam, a common personification of the continental government of the United States.

== History ==
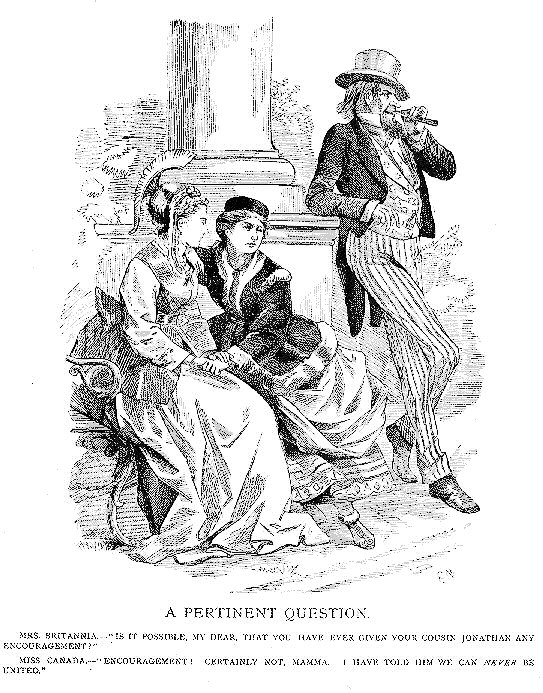
"Mrs. Britannia" and her daughter "Miss Canada" discussing whether "Cousin Jonathan" aspires to "marriage" with Canada, in an 1886 political cartoon about fears of American aspirations to bring Canada into the Union

The term dates at least to the 17th century, when it was applied to Puritan roundheads during the English Civil War. It came to include residents of colonial New England, who were mostly Puritans in support of the Parliamentarians during the war. It probably is derived from the Biblical words spoken by David after the death of his friend Jonathan, "I am distressed for thee, my brother Jonathan" (2 Samuel 1:26). As Kenneth Hopper and William Hopper put it, "Used as a term of abuse for their ... Puritan opponents by Royalists during the English Civil War, it was applied by British officers to the rebellious colonists during the American Revolution".

A popular folk tale about the origin of the term holds that the character is derived from Jonathan Trumbull (1710–1785), Governor of the State of Connecticut, which was the main source of supplies for the Northern and Middle Departments during the American Revolutionary War. It is said that George Washington uttered the words, "We must consult Brother Jonathan," when asked how he could win the war. That origin is doubtful, however, as neither man made reference to the story during his lifetime and the first appearance of the story has been traced to the mid-19th century, long after their deaths.

The character was adopted by citizens of New England from 1783 to 1815, when Brother Jonathan became a nickname for any Yankee sailor, similar to the way that G.I. is used to describe members of the U.S. Army.

The term "Uncle Sam" is thought to date approximately to the War of 1812. Uncle Sam appeared in newspapers from 1813 to 1815, and in 1816 he appeared in a book.

In 1825 John Neal wrote the novel Brother Jonathan: or, the New Englanders and had it published in Edinburgh to expose British readers to US customs and language. The emblem had been developing for decades as a minor self-referential device in American literature, but saw full development in this novel into the personification of American national character. The weekly newspaper Brother Jonathan was first published in 1842, issued out of New York. As editor in 1843, Neal used it to argue for Brother Jonathan to be the national emblem of the US. Yankee Notions, or Whittlings of Jonathan's Jack-Knife was a high-quality humor magazine, first published in 1852, that used the stock character to lampoon Yankee acquisitiveness and other peculiarities. It, too, was issued out of New York, which was a rival with neighboring New England before the Civil War. It was a popular periodical with a large circulation, and people both inside and outside New England enjoyed it as good-natured entertainment. Such jokes were often copied in newspapers as far away as California, where natives encountered Yankee ships and peddlers, inspiring Yankee impersonations in comedy burlesques.

Jules Verne included in his 1864 novel The Adventures of Captain Hatteras (French: Voyages et aventures du capitaine Hatteras) a chapter entitled "John Bull and Jonathan", in which British and American members of a polar expedition confront each other, each seeking to claim the newly-discovered island of New America. The land is named by Captain Altamont, an American explorer, who is first to set foot on it. A deleted chapter, "John Bull and Jonathan", had Hatteras and Altamont dueling for the privilege of claiming the land for their respective countries.

Around the same time, the New England–based Know Nothing Party, which Yankee Notions also lampooned, was divided into two camps—the moderate Jonathans and the radical Sams. Eventually, Uncle Sam came to replace Brother Jonathan, and the victors applied "Yankee" to all of the country by the end of the century, after the "Yankee" section had won the American Civil War. Likewise, "Uncle Sam" was applied to the Federal government. Uncle Sam came to represent the United States as a whole over the course of the late 19th century, supplanting Brother Jonathan.

According to an article in the 1893 The Lutheran Witness, Brother Jonathan and Uncle Sam were different names for the same person:

"When we meet him in politics we call him Uncle Sam; when we meet him in society we call him Brother Jonathan. Here of late Uncle Sam alias Brother Jonathan has been doing a powerful lot of complaining, hardly doing anything else."

== Legacy ==
The phrase "We must consult Brother Jonathan" appears on the graduation certificates of Yale University's Trumbull College, also named for Trumbull.

Some members of the Jonathan Club, a private social club headquartered in downtown Los Angeles, believe their club was named after Jonathan Trumbull or "Brother Jonathan". However, the club was formed in 1895, and the true inspiration for its name is lost to history.

Between 1891 and 1901, US socialist Daniel De Leon wrote more than 300 editorials as dialogues between "Uncle Sam" (a class-conscious worker who espoused the doctrines of the SLP) and "Brother Jonathan" (a worker lacking in class-consciousness).

== See also ==
- John Bull
- Marianne
- Johnny Reb
- Uncle Sam
- Columbia
- Yankee
