= John Milton Harney =

American physician and poet

John Milton Harney (1789–1825) was an American medical doctor and poet.

== Life ==
He was born in Delaware on 9 March 1789. He studied medicine and settled in Kentucky. After the death of his wife in childbirth, he took work with the New York Enquirer.

He then travelled to Europe, accepted a naval appointment, and spent several years in South America.

On his return he edited a paper, the Savannah Georgian. He became a Catholic, joined the Dominicans, then beginning their mission in Kentucky.

He died at Somerset, Kentucky, on 15 January 1825.

== Works ==
He was the author of a number of poems printed in various magazines. In 1816 he published anonymously Crystallina; a Fairy Tale, in Six Cantos. Works published posthumously were The Fever Dream, from his time in Savannah, Georgia, and "Echo and the Lover".

== Family ==
He was the elder brother of William Selby Harney; their father, Thomas Harney, was an officer in the Revolutionary War.

He married Eliza Cooper, daughter of Judge John Rowan. She died in 1815.
