= Isaac Pray =

American dramatist (1813–1869)

Isaac Clarke Pray (1813–1869) was an American writer and playwright.

Pray was born in Boston, and educated at Amherst College. He was on the staff of the Journal of Commerce and the Herald in Boston. He was a successful theatrical manager, and among the persons whom he trained for the stage was Charlotte Cushman. He appeared in a number of English and Irish theaters, and produced a successful play, Virginius, and a number of dramas and burlesques. He was the author of Poems (1837); Book of the Drama (1851); Memoirs of James Gordon Bennett and his Times; and other works.
