= List of newspapers in Pennsylvania =

This is a list of newspapers in Pennsylvania.

== Daily newspapers ==
- Altoona Mirror - Altoona
- Beaver County Times - Beaver
- Bedford Gazette - Bedford
- The Bradford Era - Bradford
- Butler Eagle - Butler
- Bucks County Courier Times - Langhorne
- Bucks County Herald - Doylestown
- Centre Daily Times - State College
- Citizens' Voice - Wilkes-Barre
- Courier-Express - DuBois
- The Daily American - Somerset
- The Daily Collegian - University Park
- The Daily Item - Sunbury
- The Daily Local News - West Chester
- The Daily News - Huntingdon
- The Daily News - McKeesport
- The Derrick/The News-Herald - Oil City
- Danville News - Danville
- Delaware County Daily Times - Upper Darby
- Ellwood City Ledger - Ellwood City
- Erie Times-News - Erie
- The Express - Lock Haven
- The Express-Times - Easton
- Gettysburg Times - Gettysburg
- The Herald - Sharon
- The Herald-Standard - Uniontown
- Indiana Gazette - Indiana
- The Intelligencer
- Kane Republican - Kane
- LNP - Lancaster
- The Mercury - Pottstown
- Metro - Philadelphia
- The Mon Valley Independent - Monesson
- The Morning Call - Allentown
- Morning Times - Sayre
- The News-Item - Shamokin
- Observer-Reporter - Washington
- Philadelphia Daily News - Philadelphia
- The Philadelphia Inquirer - Philadelphia
- Philadelphia News - Philadelphia (Russian language)
- Philadelphia Tribune - Philadelphia
- Pittsburgh Tribune-Review - Pittsburgh
- Pocono Record - Stroudsburg
- Potter Leader Enterprise - Coudersport
- Press Enterprise - Bloomsburg
- The Progress - Clearfield
- Public Opinion - Chambersburg
- Reading Eagle - Reading
- Record-Argus - Greenville
- The Record Herald - Waynesboro
- The Reporter - Lansdale
- The Republican & Herald - Pottsville
- Ridgway Record - Ridgway
- St. Marys Daily Press - Saint Marys
- The Sentinel - Carlisle
- The Sentinel - Lewistown
- The Standard-Journal - Milton
- Standard-Speaker - Hazleton
- Times Herald - Norristown
- Times Leader - Wilkes-Barre
- Times News - Lehighton
- The Times-Tribune - Scranton
- The Tribune-Democrat - Johnstown
- Titusville Herald - Titusville
- Wayne Independent - Honesdale
- Wellsboro Gazette - Wellsboro
- Williamsport Sun Gazette - Williamsport
- York Daily Record - York
- The York Dispatch - York

== Other newspapers ==
- Ambler Gazette - Ambler
- American Srbobran - Pittsburgh
- Amerika/America - Philadelphia
- The Berks-Mont News - Boyertown
- Central Penn Business Journal - Harrisburg
- Centre County Gazette - State College
- Clarion News - Clarion
- Chestnut Hill Local - Chestnut Hill
- Echo Pilot - Greencastle
- The Elizabethtown Advocate - Elizabethtown
- God's Field/Rola Boza - Scranton
- Jednota - Middletown
- Jeffersonian Democrat - Brookville
- The Jewish Exponent - Philadelphia
- Main Line Times - Ardmore
- Narodna Volia - Scranton
- Narodne Noviny - Pittsburgh
- New Pittsburgh Courier - Pittsburgh
- The News Eagle - Hawley
- The Newville Valley Times-Star - Newville
- Our Town Johnstown - Johnstown
- The Patriot-News - Harrisburg
- Pennsylvania Business Central - State College
- Perry County Times - New Bloomfield
- Philadelphia Business Journal - Philadelphia
- Philadelphia City Paper - Philadelphia
- Philadelphia Weekly - Philadelphia
- Pittsburgh Business Times - Pittsburgh
- Pittsburgh City Paper - Pittsburgh
- Pittsburgh Jewish Chronicle - Pittsburgh
- Pittsburgh Post-Gazette - Pittsburgh
- Potter Leader-Enterprise - Coudersport
- Press and Journal - Harrisburg
- The Public Record - Philadelphia
- The Leader Vindicator - New Bethlehem
- The Shippensburg News-Chronicle - Shippensburg
- The Temple News - Philadelphia
- Town and Country - Pennsburg
- The Villager - Moscow
- Wyoming County Examiner - Tunkhannock
- Zajednicar - Pittsburgh

== Defunct newspapers ==
- Adams Centinel (sic) (Gettysburg) (1800–1805 & 1813–1826)
- Adams County Independent (Littlestown) (189?–1943)
- Adams County News (Gettysburg) (1908–1917)
- Advance (Philadelphia) (1887-190?)
- Advocate (Philadelphia) (1890–?)
- Advocate (Pittsburgh) (1832–1844)
- Afro-American (Philadelphia) (1934–1937)
- Age (Philadelphia) (1866–1874)
- Agents' Herald (Philadelphia) (1877–1896)
- Agitator (Wellsborough) (1854–1865)
- Alexander's Express Messenger (Philadelphia) (1844–1846)
- All-day City Item (Philadelphia) (1872–1875)
- Alleghanian (Ebensburg) (1859–1865)
- Allegheny Mountain Echo and Johnstown Commercial Advertiser and Intelligencer (Johnstown) (1853–1861)
- Allentown Chronicle and News and Evening Item (1921–1923)
- Allentown Critic (1884–1889)
- Allentown Daily Leader (1893–1903)
- Allentown Evening Item (1915–1921)
- Allied Mercury: or The Independent Intelligencer (Philadelphia) (1781–1781)
- Alt Berks, der Stern im Osten (Reading) (1840–1844)
- Die Alte und Die neue Welt (Philadelphia) (1834-18??)
- America (Philadelphia) (19??-2013)
- American Advocate (Philadelphia) (1844–1845)
- American Eagle and Philadelphia County Democrat (Philadelphia) (1836–????)
- American Guardian (Philadelphia) (186?–1870)
- American Patriot (Bellefonte) (1814–1817)
- American Pioneer, and Fireman's Chronicle (Philadelphia) (1831–1833)
- American Reformer and Pennsylvania State Temperance Organ (Harrisburg) (184?–18??)
- American Saturday Courier) (1851–1856)
- American Weekly Mercury (Philadelphia) (1719–1749)
- Amerikanischer Correspondent für das In-und Ausland (Philadelphia) (1825–1829)
- Amerikanischer Republikaner (Pottsville) (1855–1909)
- Amerikanskij Russkij Sokol Sojedinenija (Homestead) (1926–1936)
- Amerikansky Russky Viestnik (Scranton) (189?–1952)
- American Standard (Harrisburg) (1847-18??)
- Anti-Masonic Star, and Republican Banner (Gettysburg) (1830–1831)
- Der Anti-Freimaurer, und Lecha Caunty Patriot (Allentown) (1829–1831)
- Anti-Masonic State Democrat (Harrisburg) (183?–183?)
- Anthracite Monitor (Tamaqua) (1871–1875)
- Ashland Advocate (1867–1920)
- Ashland Daily News (191?–1966)
- Ashland Record (1872–1909)
- Arthur's Home Gazette (Philadelphia) (1850–1855)
- Atkinson's Saturday Evening Post (Philadelphia) (1833–1839)
- Austin Autograph (1887–1911)
- Austin Messenger (1916–????)
- Austin Republican (1898–1906)
- Avoca Times (1889–1890)
- Bache's Philadelphia Aurora (1797–1800)
- Baner America (Scranton) (1868–1877)
- Banner von Berks, und Wochenblatt der Reading Post (Reading) (1878–1909)
- Barnesboro Eagle (1917–1924)
- Barnesborský Orol (Barnesboro) (1914–1920)
- Barthe's Weekly Star (Plymouth) (1891–1895)
- Beacon (Philadelphia) (1940–1961)
- Bellefonte Advertiser (1867–1869)
- Bellefonte Morning News (1880-19??)
- Bellefonte National (1868–1870)
- Bellefonte Republican (1869–1909)
- Berks and Schuylkill Journal (Reading) (1816–1910)
- Berks Caunty Adler (Reading) (1826–183?)
- Berks County Free Press (Reading) (1830–1835)
- Berks County Press (Reading) (1847–1865)
- Berks County Record (Reading) (1959–19??)
- Berks County Reporter (Reading) (1967–19??)
- Bicknell's Reporter, Counterfeit Detector, and Philadelphia Prices Current (1835–1857)
- Die Biene (Reading) (1867–1913)
- Bituminous Record (Philipsburg) (1885–1907)
- Blade (Scranton) (1888–1892)
- The Blue Stocking (Harrisburg) (1842–1844)
- Bomb-Shell (Harrisburg) (1848-18??)
- Borough Item (Harrisburg) (1852–1854)
- Bradford Reporter (Towanda) (1844–1884)
- Bratstvo (Wilkes-Barre) (1944-199?)
- Call (Schuylkill Haven) (1903–1951)
- Cambria Dispatch (Portage) (1929–1948)
- Cambria Freeman (Ebensburg) (1867–1938)
- Cambria Gazette (Johnstown) (1841–1853)
- Cambria Herald (Ebensburg) (1871–1898)
- Cambria Tribune (Johnstown) (1853–1864)
- Campaigner (Bellefonte) (1867–?)
- Capitolian (Harrisburg) (1842-18??)
- Carbondale Advance (18??-1889)
- Carbondale Advance and Jermyn Advocate (1889–1899)
- Carbondale Leader (1872–1944)
- Carbondale Transcript, and Lackawanna Journal (1851–1857)
- Carbondale Weekly Advance (1861-18??)
- Carrolltown News (1883–1950)
- Catholic Record (Scranton) (1887–1890)
- Der Centre Berichter (Aaronsburg) (1827–1847)
- Centre Democrat (Bellefonte) (1848–1989)
- Centre Reporter (Centre Hall) (1871–1940)
- Century (Gettysburg) (1874–1878)
- Der Christliche Botschafter (New-Berlin) (1836–1946)
- Die Christliche Zeitschrift (Gettysburg) (1838–1848)
- Chronicle, and Harrisburg Advertiser (Harrisburg) (1818–1820)
- Chronicle of the Times (Reading) (1823–1831)
- Chronicle, or, Harrisburgh Visitor (Harrisburg) (1813–1818)
- Church Advocate (Lancaster) (1846–1981)
- Citizen (Honesdale) (1908–1914)
- Citizen-Standard (1942–1966)
- Clearfield Citizen (1878–1885)
- Clearfield County Times (Curwensville) (1872–1884)
- Clearfield Democrat (1833–1839)
- Clearfield Progress (1913–1946)
- Clearfield Republican (1851–1937)
- Clearfield Times (1937–1944)
- Coaldale Observer (Coaldale) (1910–1958)
- Coalport Standard (1884–1934)
- Comet (Bellefonte) (1857-18??)
- Commercial Journal (Pittsburgh)
- Commonwealth (Pittsburgh)
- Commonwealth (Harrisburg) (1897-1???)
- Commonwealth (Tionesta) (1880–1885)
- Compiler (Gettysburg) (1857–1866)
- Coudersport Democrat (1898–????)
- Country Dollar (Clearfield) (1849–1851)
- Country Mirror and Lackawannian (Scranton) (1845–1847)
- County Review (Curwensville) (1882–1910)
- Courier (Harrisburg) (1903–1924)
- Country Impressions (Sweet Valley) (1965–1974)
- Country Mirror and Lackawannian (Scranton) (1845–1847)
- Courier Herald (Wilkes-Barre) (1894–1953)
- Cresson Gallitzin Mainliner (1975–1999)
- Cross Fork News (1902–1906)
- Crystal Fountain and Pennsylvania Temperance Journal (Harrisburg) (1853–1856)
- Curwensville Herald (1915–1944)
- Daily American (Harrisburg) (1850–1851)
- Daily Bulletin (Hazleton) (1879–1893)
- Daily Chronicle and News (Allentown) (1883–1895)
- Daily Dawn (Harrisburg) (187?–18??)
- Daily Democrat (Scranton) (1869-187?)
- Daily Evening Mercury (Harrisburg) (1873–1874)
- Daily Intelligencer (Harrisburg) (1841–1847)
- Daily Legislative Union (Harrisburg) (1854-185?)
- Daily News (Hazleton) (1870–1875)
- Daily News-Dealer (Wilkes-Barre) (1889–1894)
- Daily Public Spirit (Clearfield) (1901–1920)
- Daily Record of the Times (Wilkes-Barre) (1873–1876)
- Daily Review (Reading) (1895–1899)
- Daily Sentinel (Hazleton) (1869–1879)
- Daily Times (Scranton) (1874–1883)
- Dauphin Caunty Journal (Harrisburg) (1877–1887)
- Demokratischer Wächter, Luzerne und Columbia County Anzeiger (Wilkes-Barre) (18??-1909)
- Deutsch-Amerikanischer Volks-Freund (Wilkes-Barre) (1880–1884)
- Deutsches Wochenblatt (Abbottstaun [sic]) (1848-18??)
- Di Idishe Shṭime (Reading) (1922–1929)
- Diocesan Record (Scranton) (1890-190?)
- Dollar Weekly News (Scranton) (18??-18??)
- Draugas (Wilkes-Barre) (1909–1916)
- The Druid (Scranton) (1907–1914)
- DuBois Daily Express (1909–1927)
- DuBois Courier Express (1947–1964)
- DuBois Weekly Courier (1882–1917)
- East Berlin News (East Berlin) (1893–1925)
- East Berlin news and Biglerville News (East Berlin) (1925–1930)
- East Penn Free Press (Emmaus) (1984–1988)
- Echo Polskie (Kingston) (1927-19??)
- Elk Advocate (Ridgway) (186?–1868)
- Erie Gazette (Erie) (1820-1864)
- Evening Chronicle (Allentown)
- Evening Express (DuBois) (1892–1909)
- Evening Gazette (Pittston) (1882–1900)
- Evening Herald (Shenandoah) (1891–1966)
- Evening Leader (Wilkes-Barre) (1884–1898)
- Evening News (Wilkes-Barre) (1909–1939)
- Evening Public Ledger (Philadelphia) (1914–1942)
- Exeter Echo (1939–1956)
- Farmers' and Mechanics' Journal (Gettysburg) (1842-18??)
- Fest-Zeitung (Scranton) (1884-18??)
- Forest Republican (Tionesta) (1869–1952)
- Free Lance (State College) (1887–1904)
- Freeland Progress (1881–1890)
- Free Patrol (Scranton) (1877-18??)
- Free Press (Emmaus) (1980–1984)
- Galeton Dispatch (1896–1903)
- Galeton Democrat (1903–1909)
- Garfield Thomas Watertunnel (University Park) (1969)
- Gazette of the United States, & Philadelphia Daily Advertiser (Philadelphia) (1796–1800)
- Genesee Times (1899–1902 & 1903–1914)
- Gettysburg Compiler (Gettysburg) (1866–1961)
- Gettysburg Star (Gettysburg) (1864–1867)
- Gettysburg Truth (Gettysburg) (1887–1891)
- Gleaner (Wilkes-Barre) (1812–1818)
- Glen Summit Breeze (1893–1902)
- Górnik (Wilkes-Barre) (192?–194?)
- Greater Hazleton Mirror (1972-19??)
- Gwerinwr Cymreig (Scranton) 18??-?)
- Gwiazda (Philadelphia) (1902–1985)
- Harrisburg Telegraph (1879–1948)
- Hazleton Journal (1936-19??)
- Hazleton Patriot (1975-19??)
- Hazleton Sentinel (1866–1880)
- Hazleton Standard-Speaker (1961–1980)
- Das Hazleton Volksblatt (1872–1906)
- Herald of the Union (Scranton) (1856-186?)
- Der Herold (Scranton) (187?-?)
- The Hershey Chronicle
- The Hershey News
- The Hershey Press
- Highland Patriot (Coudersport) (1854–1858)
- Honesdale Democrat (1844–1864)
- Houtzdale Citizen (1900–1934)
- Houtzdale Citizen and Coalport Standard (1934–1942)
- Houtzdale Observer (1882–1899)
- Howard Hustler (1898–1915)
- Howard Weekly Hornet (1894–1898)
- Hyde Park Item and Real Estate Journal (Scranton) (1874-18??)
- Index (Scranton) (1887–1899)
- Industrial Advocate (Scranton) (1877–1878)
- Investigator (East-Berlin) (1844-18??)
- Jednota (Scranton) (1902–1904)
- Jeffersonian (Littlestown) (1899-190?)
- Jewish Journal of the Anthracite Region (Wilkes-Barre) (193?–193?)
- Journal (White Haven) (1900–1981)
- Keystone Gazette (Bellefonte) (1937–1959)
- Kingston Times (188?–1???)
- Lackawanna Herald and American Advocate (Scranton) (185?-?)
- Lackawanna Intelligencer (Scranton) (1882–1886)
- Lackawanna Register (Scranton) (1863-186?)
- La Libera Parola (Philadelphia) (1918–1969)
- Leader-Courier (Osceola Mills) (1890–1922)
- Leader-Dispatch (Galeton) (1903–1958)
- Lebanon County Bulletin - Fredericksburg
- Lebanon Semi-Weekly News
- Der Lecha Caunty Patriot (Allentown) (1859–1872)
- Der Lecha Patriot und Northampton Demokrat (Allentown) (1839–1848)
- Lehigh Regiater (Allentown), 1846–1912
- Der Liberale Beobachter und Berks, Montgomery und Schuylkill Caunties Allgemeine Anzeiger (Reading) (1839–1864)
- Light on the Hill (Scranton) (1873-18??)
- Literary Visitor (Wilkes-Barre) (1813–1815)
- Littlestown News (1874–1878)
- Luzerne Federalist and Susquehannah Intelligencer (Wilkes-Barre) (1801–1809)
- Luzerne Union (Wilkes-Barre) (1853–1879)
- Marienville Express (1890–1952)
- McKeesport Daily News
- Millheim Journal (Millheim) (1876–1984)
- Il Minatore (Scranton) (1912–1940)
- Monitor (Clearfield) (1892–1905)
- Montgomery County Record
- Mountaineer (Curwensville) (1903–1915)
- Mountain Times (Bellefonte) (1918–1933)
- Multum in Parvo, and Plain Talker (Clearfield) (1833–1885)
- Narodna voli︠a︡ (Scranton) (1910–?)
- National Gazette and Literary Register (Philadelphia)
- New Oxford Item (1879–1967)
- News (Cross Fork) (1897–1902)
- News Comet (East Berlin) (1930–1952)
- Oswayo Valley Mail (Shingle House) (1901–1962)
- Oswayo Valley Record (1900–1902)
- Palladium (Shinglehouse) (1882–1884)
- The Patriot (Indiana) (1914–1955)
- The Patriot (Harrisburg) (1891–1996)
- Penn State Collegian (State College) (1911–1940)
- Pennsylvania Chronicle (Philadelphia) (1767-?)
- The Pennsylvania Journal (Philadelphia) (1742-?)
- Pennsylvania Mirror (State College) (1968–1977)
- True American (Philadelphia) (?)
- Pennsylvania Packet (Philadelphia) (?)
- Pennsylvanische Staats Zeitung (Harrisburg) (1843–1887)
- The People (Scranton) (1886–1892)
- People's Journal (Coudersport) (1850–1857)
- Petroleum Centre Daily Record (1868–1873)
- Philadelphia Afro-American (1937–1965)
- Philadelphia Aurora
- Philadelphia Bulletin (1847–1982)
- Philadelphia Demokrat
- Philadelphia Evening Telegraph
- Philadelphia Journal (1977–1981)
- Philadelphia North American
- Philadelphia Press (1885–1920)
- Philadelphia Record (1877–1947)
- Pittsburgh Commercial
- Pittsburgh Dispatch
- Pittsburgh Leader
- Pittsburgh Mercury
- Pittsburgh Press (1884–1992)
- Pittsburgh Sun-Telegraph (1927–1960)
- The Pittsburg Times
- Pittsburgh Tribune-Review (print edition 1992–2016)
- Polish American Journal (Scranton) (1948–1972)
- Potter County journal (Coudersport) (1880–1969)
- Potter Democrat (Coudersport) (1893–1919)
- Potter Enterprise (Coudersport) (1950–1987 & 1931–1950)
- Potter Journal (Coudersport) (1857–1872)
- Potter Pioneer (Coudersport) (1843–1851)
- Press (Philadelphia) (1880–1885)
- Providence Echo (Scranton) (1879–1881)
- Potter enterprise and the Potter Independent (Coudersport) (1920–1931)
- Public Ledger (Philadelphia) (1836–1942)
- Quakertown Free Press
- La Ragione (Philadelphia) (1917–?)
- La Rassegna (Philadelphia) (1917–?)
- Republic (Honesdale) (1864–1868)
- Republican Compiler (Gettysburg) (1818–1857)
- Roulette Recorder (1903–1919)
- Sprig of Liberty (Gettysburg) (1804–1807)
- Tribune-Republican (Scranton) (1910–1915)
- Scranton Republican (1877–1910)
- Scranton Tribune (1891–1910)
- Scranton Wochenblatt (Scranton) (1865–1918)
- Sokol Sojedinenija = Sokol Soedynenii︠a︡ (Homestead) (1914–1926)
- Star (Scranton) (1871-18??)
- Star and Banner (Gettysburg) (1847–1864)
- Star and Republican Banner (Gettysburg) (1832–1847)
- Star-Independent (Harrisburg) (1904–1917)
- State College Times (1932–1934)
- Sunbury American (1848–1879)
- The Sunday Morning News (Scranton) (1878–1901)
- Sunday News (Wilkes-Barre) (1899–1904)
- Sunday News Dealer (Wilkes-Barre) (1833–1898)
- Der Susquehanna Beobachter, und Luzerne und Columbia Caunty Advertiser (Wilkesbarre) (1826–1830)
- Times (State College) (1898–1932)
- True Democrat (Wilkes-Barre) (1852–1854)
- True Republic (Scranton) (1882-1???)
- Turtle Creek Independent
- Ulysses Sentinel (1881–1916)
- Der Vaterlands-Wächter (Harrisburg) (18??-1876)
- Wage-earner's Journal (Philipsburg) (1885–1907)
- Wayne Citizen (Honesdale) (1868–1873)
- Weekly Press (Philadelphia) (1857–1861, 1883–1905)
- West Oak Lane Beacon (Philadelphia) (1951–1965)
- West Philadelphia Saturday Star (Philadelphia) (1860–1872)
- West Philadelphia Times (Philadelphia) (1924–1946)
- West Side Progress (Scranton) (1884-18??)
- Whig State Journal (Harrisburg) (1851–1853)
- Wilkes-Barre Times Leader (1907–1939, 1978–1982)
- Wilkes-Barre Weekly Times (1894–1904)
- Workingman (Pottsville) (1873–1876)
- Wyoming Herald (Wilkes-Barre) (1818–1835)
- Wyoming Observer (1967–1970)
- Wyoming Republican (Kingston) (1832–1835)
- Wyoming Valley Observer (1970–1979)

=== Bristol ===
Newspapers published in Bristol, Pennsylvania:

- Aurora. General Advertiser. D., Aug. 30-Oct. 19, 1799.

=== Bustleton ===
Newspapers published in Bustleton, Pennsylvania:

- Porcupine's Gazette. W., Sept. 6-Oct. 26, 1799.

=== Carlisle ===
Newspapers published in Carlisle, Pennsylvania:

- The Carlisle Gazette, and The Western Repository Of Knowledge. W., Aug. 10, 1785-Jan. 1, 1794.
- Kline's Carlisle Weekly Gazette. W., Jan. 8, 1794-Dec. 31, 1800+
- The Telegraphe.. W., Feb. 10, 1795-May 3, 1796.

=== Chambersburg ===
Newspapers published in Chambersburg, Pennsylvania:

- Farmer's Register. W., Apr. 18, 1798-Apr. 10, 1799.
- The Franklin Repository. W., Apr. 21, 1796-Dec. 25, 1800+ In 1852 it was purchased by Alexander McClure, who built it into a leading Republican (anti-slavery) paper.

=== Chestnut Hill ===
Newspapers published in Chestnut Hill, Pennsylvania:

- Chesnuthiller Wochenschrift. W., Dec. 15, 1790-Aug. 20, 1793.

=== Doylestown ===
Newspapers published in Doylestown, Pennsylvania:

- The Farmers' Weekly Journal. W., July 25 (?), 1800+

=== Easton ===
Newspapers published in Easton, Pennsylvania:

- American Eagle
- Neuer Unpartheyischer Eastoner Bothe, Und Northampton Kundschafter. W., Aug. (?), 1793-Dec. (?), 1800+

=== Gettysburg ===
Newspapers published in Gettysburg, Pennsylvania:

- The Gettysburg Times (1800-today)

=== Germantown ===
Newspapers published in Germantown, Pennsylvania:

- Die Germantauner Zeitung. Bi-W., W., Feb. 8, 1785-July 16, 1793.
- Pensylvanische Berichte, Oder, Sammlung Wichtiger Nachrichten Aus Dem Natur- Und Kirchen-Reich. M., S.M., Fortnightly, June 16, 1746-July 1766.

=== Harrisburg ===
Newspapers published in Harrisburg, Pennsylvania:

- The Harrisburgh Journal, and The Weekly Advertiser. W., Aug. 26. 1789-(?).
- The Oracle Of Dauphin, and Harrisburgh Advertiser. W., Oct. 20, 1792-Dec. 29, 1800+
- Harrisburg Telegraph, being published in 1874

=== Lancaster ===
Newspapers published in Lancaster, Pennsylvania:

- Der Deutsche Porcupein, Und Lancaster Anzeigis-Nachrichten. W., Jan. 3, 1798-Dec. 25, 1799.
- Lancaster Journal. W., June 18, 1794-Dec. 27, 1800+
- Neue Unpartheyische Lancaster Zeitung, Und Anzeigs- Nachrichten. W., Aug. 8, 1787-Nov. 1, 1797 (?).
- The Pennsylvania Packet, Or, The General Advertiser. W., Nov. 29, 1777-June 17, 1778.
- Das Pennsylvanische Zeitungs-Blat, Oder, Sammlung Sowohl Auswartig- Als Einheimischer Neuigkeiten.. W., Feb. 4- June 24, 1778.

=== Media ===
Newspapers published in Media, Pennsylvania:

- Delaware County American, 1859-?

=== Norristown ===
Newspapers published in Norristown, Pennsylvania:

- The Norristown Gazette. W., June 15, 1799 – June 6, 1800.

=== Northumberland ===
Newspapers published in Northumberland, Pennsylvania:

- The Sunbury and Northumberland Gazette.. W., Oct. 9(?), 1793-Dec. 27, 1800+

=== Philadelphia ===
Newspapers published in Philadelphia, Pennsylvania:

- The American Herald, and General Advertiser. S.W., June 21-July 5, 1784.
- The American Naval and Commercial Register. S.W., Nov. 25- Dec. 19, 1795.
- The American Star. L'Etoile Americaine. TW., W., Apr. 1- May 3, 1794.
- The American Star, Or, Historical, Political, Critical, and Moral Journal. T.W., Feb. 1-Mar. 25, 1794.

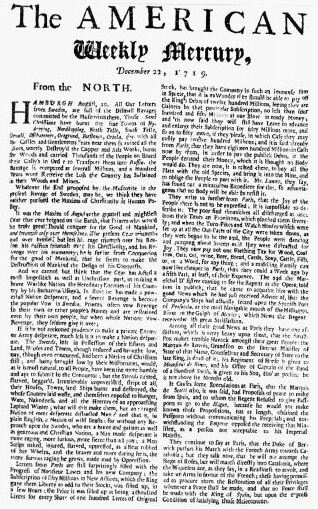
American Weekly Mercury, 1719; established by Andrew Bradford

- The American Weekly Mercury. W., Dec. 22, 1719-May 22 (?), 1746.
- Aurora. General Advertiser. D., Nov. 8, 1794-Dec. 1800+
- Bache's Philadelphia Aurora. T.W., June 14, 1797- Mar. 6/7, 1800.
- Carey's Pennsylvania Evening Herald. S.W., Jan. 25- Feb. 8, 1785.
- Carey's Pennsylvania Evening Herald and American Monitor. S.W., Feb. 12-Mar. 22, 1785.
- Carey's United States' Recorder. T.W., Jan. 23-Aug. 30, 1798.
- Claypoole's American Daily Advertiser. D., Jan. 1, 1796- Sept. 30, 1800.
- The Complete Counting House Companion. W., Mar. 19, 1785(?)-Oct. 30, 1790.
- The Constitutional Diary and Philadelphia Evening Advertiser. D., Dec. 2, 1799-Feb. 3, 1800.
- Country Porcupine. T.W., Mar,. 3/5, 1798-Aug. 27/28, 1799.
- Courier De l'Amerique. S.W., July 27-Oct. 26, 1784.
- Courier De l'Amerique. S.W., Dec. 4, 1792-Feb. 22, 1793.
- Courrier Francais. D., T., W. Apr. 15, 1794-July 3, 1798.
- The Daily Advertiser. D., Feb. 7-July 4, 1797.
- The Dessert To The True American. W., July 14, 1798- Aug. 19, 1799.
- Dunlap and Claypooles American Daily Advertiser. D., Dec. 9, 1793-Dec. 31, 1795.
- Dunlap's American Daily Advertiser. D., Jan. 1, 1791- Dec. 7, 1793.
- Dunlap's Pennsylvania Packet, Or, The General Advertiser. W., Oct. 25, 1773-Sept. 9, 1777.
- The Evening Chronicle. T.W., S.W., May 5-Nov. 7, 1787.
- The Evening Chronicle, Or, The Philadelphia Advertiser. T.W., Feb. 6-May 3, 1787.
- The Federal Gazette and Philadelphia Daily Advertiser. D., Apr. 1, 1790-Dec. 31, 1793.
- The Federal Gazette, and Philadelphia Evening Post. D., Oct. 1, 1788-Mar. 31, 1790.
- The Federal Gazette, and The Philadelphia Evening Post. T.W., Mar. 8-Apr. 24, 1788.
- Finlay's American Naval and Commercial Register. S.W., Dec. 28, 1795-May 1, 1798.
- The Freeman's Journal, Or, The North-American Intelligencer. W., Apr. 25, 1781-May 16, 1792.
- Gale's Independent Gazetteer. S.W., Sept. 16, 1796- Sept. 12, 1797.
- Gazette of the United States. S.W., Nov. 3, 1790-Sept. 18, 1793.
- Gazette Of The United States. D., July 1, 1795 – June 30, 1796.
- Gazette of the United States, & Daily Advertiser. D., June 28-Dec. 31, 1800+
- Gazette of the United States and Daily Evening Advertiser. D., June 12, 1794 – June 30, 1795.
- Gazette of the United States and Evening Advertiser. D., Dec. 11, 1793-June 11, 1794.
- Gazette of the United States, & Philadelphia Daily Advertiser. D., July 1, 1796 – June 27, 1800.
- Gemeinnutzigige Philadelphische Correspondenz. W., May 2, 1781-Sept. 24, 1790.
- General Advertiser. D., Aug. 16, 1791-Nov. 7, 1794.
- General Advertiser, and Political, Commercial, Agricultural and Literary Journal. D., Oct. 1, 1790-Aug. 15, 1791.
- Der General-Postbothe An Die Deutsche Nation In Amerika. S.W., Jan. 5, 1790-June 29, 1790.
- Heinrich Millers Pennsylvanisher Staatsbote. S.W, W., May 23, 1775 – May 26, 1779.
- The Independent Gazetteer. S.W., Jan. 11, 1794-Sept. 10, 1796.
- The Independent Gazetteer, and Agricultural Repository. W., Jan. 16, 1790-Jan. 4, 1794.
- The Independent Gazetteer, Or, The Chronicle Of Freedom. W., S.W., D., Apr. 13, 1782-Jan. 9, 1790.
- The Level Of Europe and North America.. Oct. 1, 1794.
- The Level Of Europe and North America, Or, The Observer's Guide. Feb. 9, 1795-Jan. 27, 1796.
- The Mail, Or, Claypoole's Daily Advertiser. D. June 1, 1791-Sept. 30, 1793.
- National Gazette. S.W., Oct. 31, 1791-Oct. 26, 1793.
- Neue Philadelphische Correspondenz. S.W., W., Oct. 1, 1790-Nov. 20, 1792.
- The New World. D., Oct. 24, 1796-Aug. 16, 1797.
- The New World, Or, The Morning and Evening Gazette. Twice Daily, Aug. 15, 1796-Oct. 24, 1796.
- The Pennsylvania Chronicle, and Universal Advertiser. W., Jan. 26, 1767-Feb. 8, 1774.
- The Pennsylvania Evening Herald: and The American Monitor. S.W., Mar. 26, 1785-May 27, 1786.
- The Pennsylvania Evening Post. T.W., S.W., Jan. 24, 1775- July 30, 1781.
- The Pennsylvania Evening Post, and Daily Advertiser. D., May 30, 1783-Oct. 26, 1784.
- The Pennsylvania Evening Post, and Public Advertiser. D., Aug. 3, 1781-May 19, 1783.
- The Pennsylvania Gazette. W., Oct. 2, 1729-Sept. 10, 1777; Dec. 20, 1777-June 20, 1778; Nov. 13, 1782-Dec. 24, 1800+
- The Pennsylvania Gazette, and Weekly Advertiser. W., Jan. 5, 1779-Nov. 6, 1782.
- The Pennsylvania Herald, and General Advertiser. S.W., T.W., May 31, 1786-Feb. 14, 1788.
- The Pennsylvania Journal, and The Weekly Advertiser. W., Jan. 30, 1766-Sept. 1777.
- The Pennsylvania Journal and The Weekly Advertiser. W., S.W., May 17, 1780-Sept. 18, 1793.
- The Pennsylvania Journal, and Weekly Advertiser. W., June 13, 1751-Jan. 23, 1766.
- The Pennsylvania Journal and Weekly Advertiser. W., Dec. 23, 1778-May 10, 1780.
- The Pennsylvania Journal, Or, Weekly Advertiser. W., Dec. 21, 1742-June 6, 1751.

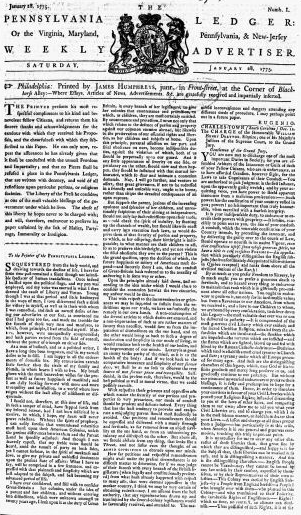
Pennsylvania Ledger: or the Virginia, Maryland, Pennsylvania, & New-Jersey Weekly Advertiser, 1775

- The Pennsylvania Ledger, Or, The Philadelphia Market-Day Advertiser. S.W., Dec. 3, 1777-May 23, 1778.
- The Pennsylvania Ledger, Or, The Virginia, Maryland, Pennsylvania, & New-Jersey Weekly Advertiser. W., Jan. 28, 1775-Nov. 30, 1776.
- The Pennsylvania Ledger, Or, The Weekly Advertiser. W., Oct. 10-Nov. 26, 1777.
- The Pennsylvania Mercury, and Philadelphia Price-Current. T.W., W., July 21, 1791-Mar. 1, 1792.
- The Pennsylvania Mercury, and The Universal Advertiser. W., Apr. 7, 1775.
- The Pennsylvania Mercury, and Universal Advertiser. W., T.W., Aug. 20, 1784-July 19, 1791.
- The Pennsylvania Packet, and Daily Advertiser. D., Sept. 21, 1784-Dec. 31, 1790.
- The Pennsylvania Packet, and General Advertiser. T.W., Oct. 14, 1783-Sept. 18, 1784.

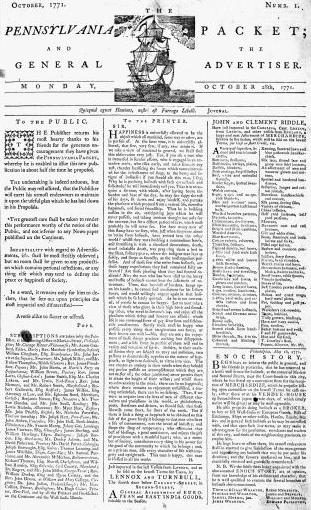
Pennsylvania Packet; and the General Advertiser, 1771

- The Pennsylvania Packet. and The General Advertiser. W., Oct. 28, 1771-Oct. 18, 1773.
- The Pennsylvania Packet, Or, The General Advertiser. T.W., S.W., July 4, 1778-Oct. 11, 1783.
- Pennsylvanische Fama, Oder, Ordentlicher Relation Derer Einlauffenden Neuigkeiten. W., Feb. 1748(?)-1751.
- Die Pennsylvanische Gazette, Oder, Der Allgemeine Americanische Zeitungs-Schreiber. W., Feb. 3, 1779.
- Pennsylvanische Staats-Courier. W., Oct. 4, 1777- June(?), 1778.
- The Philadelphia Aurora. T.W., Mar. 10-Nov. 5, 1800.
- The Philadelphia Gazette & Daily Advertiser. D., June 18- Dec. 31, 1800+
- The Philadelphia Gazette and Universal Daily Advertiser. D., Jan. 1, 1794-June 17, 1800.
- The Philadelphia Minerva. W., Feb. 7, 1795-July 7, 1798.
- The Philadelphia Price Current. B.W., Oct. (?), 1783- Nov. (?), 1785.
- Philadelphische Correspondenz. W., S.W., Nov. 27, 1792- April, 1800.

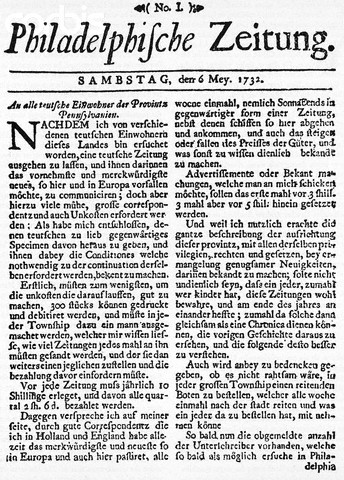
First issue of Philadelphischer Zeitung.

- Philadelphischer Zeitung. May 6, 1732-(?)
- Porcupine's Gazette. D., Apr. 24, 1797-Aug. 28, 1799.
- Porcupine's Gazette and United States Daily Advertiser. D., Mar. 4-Apr. 22, 1797.
- Poulson's American Daily Advertiser. D., Oct. 1, 1800+
- The Royal Pennsylvania Gazette. S.W., Mar. 3-May 26, 1778.
- Southwark Gazette, and Philadelphia Chronicle. T.W., July 15-Aug. 1, 1797.
- Story & Humphreys's Pennsylvania Mercury, and Universal Advertiser. W., Apr. 14-Dec. 22, 1775.
- The Supporter, Or, Daily Repast. D., W., Apr. 4 (?)- Nov. 10, 1800.
- The True American and Commercial Advertiser. D., July 2, 1798-Dec. 31, 1800+
- The Universal Gazette. Indexed. W., Nov. 16, 1797- Sept. 11, 1800.
- The Universal Instructor In All Arts and Sciences, and Pennsylvania Gazette. W., Dec. 24, 1728-Sept. 25, 1729.
- Der Wochentliche Philadelphische Staatsbote. W., Jan. 18, 1762-Dec. 28, 1767.
- Der Wochentliche Pennsylvanische Staatsbote. W., Jan. 5, 1768-May 16, 1775.

=== Pittsburgh ===
Newspapers published in Pittsburgh, Pennsylvania:

- The Pittsburgh Gazette. W., Jul. 29, 1786–Dec. (?), 1800+
- The Tree Of Liberty. W., Aug. 16, 1800+

=== Reading ===
Newspapers published in Reading, Pennsylvania:

- Neue Unpartheyische Readinger Zeitung, Und Anzeigs- Nachrichten. W., Feb. 18, 1789-Dec. 31, 1800+
- Der Unpartheyische Reading Adler. W., Nov.29, 1796- Jan. 10, 1797.
- Der Unpartheyische Readinger Adler. W., Jan. 17, 1797- Dec. 30, 1800+
- The Weekly Advertiser, Of Reading, In The County Of Berks. W., May 7, 1796-Dec. 27, 1800+

=== Washington ===
Newspapers published in Washington, Pennsylvania:

- Herald Of Liberty. W., Feb. 6, 1798-Dec. 31, 1800+

=== York ===
Newspapers published in York, Pennsylvania:

- The Pennsylvania Herald, and York General Advertiser. W., Jan. 7, 1789-Jan. (?), 1800.

== See also ==
- Media in Erie, Pennsylvania
- Media of Philadelphia
- Media in Pittsburgh

Adjoining states

Comprehensive

- Lists of newspapers
- List of newspapers in the United States

Frequency

- List of free daily newspapers in the United States
- List of weekly newspapers in the United States

Circulation

- List of international newspapers originating in the United States
- List of national newspapers in the United States
- List of newspapers in the United States by circulation

Foreign language

- List of French-language newspapers published in the United States
- List of German-language newspapers published in the United States
- List of Spanish-language newspapers published in the United States

Specialty

- List of African-American newspapers in the United States
- List of alternative weekly newspapers in the United States
- List of business newspapers in the United States
- List of family-owned newspapers in the United States
- List of Jewish newspapers in the United States
- List of LGBTQ periodicals in the United States
- List of student newspapers in the United States
- List of supermarket tabloids in the United States
- List of underground press in the United States

Other

- List of defunct newspapers of the United States
