= WRAX =

WRAX may refer to:

- WRAX (AM), a radio station (1600 AM) licensed to serve Bedford, Pennsylvania, United States
- WRAX (FM), a defunct radio station (98.9 FM) formerly licensed to serve Lake Isabella, Michigan, United States
- WJQX, a radio station (100.5 FM) licensed to serve Helena, Alabama, United States, which held the call sign WRAX from 2005 to 2006
- WUHT, a radio station (107.7 FM) licensed to serve Birmingham, Alabama, which held the call sign WRAX from 1997 to 2005
- WERC-FM, a radio station (105.5 FM) licensed to serve Hoover, Alabama, which held the call sign WRAX from 1996 to 1997
- WAYC, a radio station (100.9 FM) licensed to serve Bedford, Pennsylvania, United States, which held the call sign WRAX from 1980 to 1993
