= Watertown Daily Times =

Newspaper in New York, US

- Type: Daily newspaper
- Format: Berliner
- Owner: Johnson Newspaper Corporation
- Publisher: Alec Johnson
- Managing editor: Brian Kelly
- Founded: 1861
- Language: English
- Headquarters: 260 Washington Street; Watertown, New York 13601; United States
- Circulation: 16,546 Daily (as of 2017)
- Website: www.nny360.com

The Watertown Daily Times is a newspaper published Tuesday through Saturday in Watertown, New York. It began in 1850 as the New York Reformer and became the Watertown Daily Informer when purchased by Beaman Brockway in 1861. The newspaper was renamed the Watertown Daily Times in 1870 and is owned by the Johnson family of Watertown.

== Overview ==
The Watertown Daily Times provides coverage of Jefferson County, Lewis County, St. Lawrence County and Oswego County. For years, the Times was the smallest newspaper in the country to have its own Washington, D.C., bureau.

The Times covers its geographically expansive coverage area through a network of bureaus and shared resources with its sister newspapers. In addition to Watertown, the newspaper has news-gathering operations in Lowville, Canton, Massena and Malone.

== Johnson Newspaper Corporation ==
In 1904 Harold B. Johnson joined the Times as a reporter, and by the 1930s had purchased controlling interest in its publisher, the Brockway Company. The company name was changed to Johnson Newspaper Corporation in 1977.

The Times is the flagship publication of the Johnson Newspaper Corporation, which owns newspapers across New York. In addition to the Times and its weeklies, it owns The Malone Telegram and Lowville’s Journal & Republican.

Johnson Newspaper produces a number of publications, including the Jefferson County Pennysaver, monthly NNY Business magazine, and seasonal NNY Living magazine. In 2025, it was announced that the Massena Courier Observer, the Ogdensburg Journal, and the St. Lawrence Plaindealer would be amalgamated into a single county-wide title, the Advance News, yet continue to feature the mastheads of The Journal, Plaindealer, and Courier Observer. All of these publications are represented online by the Times' NNY360 brand, and online at NNY360.com and mymalonetelegram.com.

In 2023, the Johnson Newspaper Corporation sold the Batavia Daily News, Livingston County News, Oswego County News, and the Oswego Shopper to the Sample New Group. During the same period, the Hudson Register-Star and Catskill Daily Mail were sold to the Schenectady Daily Gazette.

Johnson Newspaper (as the Brockway Company) also spawned the WWNY radio and television stations. The television station still has the WWNY-TV calls, while the radio station is now WTNY.
