= Eagle Newspapers =

Eagle Newspapers may refer to one of these U.S. newspaper publishers:

- Eagle Newspapers (New York)
- Eagle Newspapers (Oregon)

== See also ==
- The Eagle (newspaper), a list of newspapers
