= HMZ =

HMZ may refer to:

- Bedford County Airport, in Pennsylvania, United States
- Hmong Shua language, spoken in China
- Hydrometeorological Institute of Slovenia (Slovene: Hidrometeorološki zavod Slovenije)
