= KHMZ =

KHMZ may refer to:

- KHMZ (FM), a radio station (94.9 FM) licensed to serve Snyder, Texas, United States
- Bedford County Airport (ICAO code KHMZ)
