= Rutland Herald =

Daily newspaper in Rutland, Vermont

- The July 27, 2005 front page of the Rutland Herald
- Type: Daily newspaper
- Format: Broadsheet
- Owner: Sample News Group
- Publisher: Ed Coats
- Editor: Jim Sabataso
- Founded: 1794
- Headquarters: 77 Grove Street; Rutland, VT 05702; United States
- Circulation: 9,100 (as of 2021)
- Website: rutlandherald.com

The Rutland Herald, previously called the Rutland Daily Herald, is the second largest daily newspaper in the U.S. state of Vermont (after The Burlington Free Press). It is published in Rutland with its source of news geared towards the southern part of the state, along with the Brattleboro Reformer and the Bennington Banner. The Rutland Herald is the sister paper of the Barre Montpelier Times Argus.

== History ==
The Williams–Williams partnership launched the Herald as a weekly on December 8, 1794. The Rev. Samuel Williams (1743–1800) was a Federalist; his newspaper barely touched upon local news. Judge Samuel Williams (1756–1800) was a distant cousin and political leader of early Vermont. Both are buried on North Main Street in Rutland in the same cemetery. In the era of printing, William Fay (1797–1840) put out papers that were largely devoted to biblical parables, fables, poems and homilies.

George Beaman (1844–1856) provided welcome invigoration for political and technological reasons. He was an abolitionist who wanted to influence his Whig party (which soon became the Republican party) with anti-slavery sentiments. Due to Beaman's boosterism, the railroad was routed through Rutland.

During the era of George and Albert Tuttle (father and son, 1856–1882), the Herald moved to daily publication when the Civil War began and provided some distinguished reportage on the war. In 1877, a major competitor, the Globe, and the Herald merged. Seeking new investors, Albert Tuttle netted P. W. Clement; Clement owned the Herald from 1882 to 1927. A Rutland native, Clement also owned Rutland Railroad, the Clement National Bank, New York real estate interests and a brokerage house. He used his newspaper to support his own projects and political views. He had a rivalry with the Proctor family of the Vermont Marble Co. Clement held several political offices and ran for governor three times before being elected in 1918 at the age of 73.

During William H. Field and his son William's (1927–1947) time, also a Rutland native, Field had a career as an executive with the Chicago Tribune and was co-founder of the nation's largest-circulation newspaper, the New York Daily News, before returning to Rutland on the death of his father-in-law, Clement, in 1927. At the Herald, he started an advertising department, modernized business operations, and wrote the annual "Lilac Time" editorial. Bill Field engaged a distinguished typographer to re-design the paper, and he moved the Herald into its present Wales Street building.

Mitchell started at the Herald in 1935 as a Vermont Press Bureau reporter in Montpelier, later became editor in 1941, and was acting publisher during World War II, when Field enlisted. Rutland was hit by a massive flood in 1947, losing railroad infrastructure and stoneworking and smokestack industries. In 1950, he launched some 10,000 editorials over 40 years that promoted the economy and industrial diversification of Rutland. Mitchell opposed "chain" newspapers, but the Herald in 1964 acquired the Barre-Montpelier Times Argus to keep it in local ownership. In 1975, his papers launched a joint Sunday edition. In 1986, the Mitchells acquired the Noble interests in both papers, fending off interest from national newspaper chains based on a Noble–Mitchell handshake agreement. Bob Mitchell died in 1993, and his son, R. John Mitchell, publisher since 1978 of the Times Argus, succeeded his father as Herald publisher.

In 2016, the Mitchell family sold the Herald and Times Argus to Vermont Community Media, owned by businessmen Chip Harris of New Hampshire and Reade Brower of Maine. In 2018, Vermont Community Media sold the Herald and Times Argus to Sample News Group, who owns the Eagle Times.

== Notable contributors ==
In 2001, the Herald won a Pulitzer Prize for the work of journalist David Moats. Given for his series of editorials defending the civil union decision in Vermont, this was the first Pulitzer given to the state for journalism.

Award-winning cartoonist Jeff Danziger started his career with the Herald in 1975 and still contributes editorial cartoons and a weekly serial titled 'The Teeds: Tales of Agriculture for the Young and Old'.

Susan Youngwood's 2007 article detailing the anti-Wikipedia stance of professors at Middlebury College has become a commonly cited description of the lack of expertise of Wikipedia editors.
