= Mac Martin =

American musician (1925–2022)

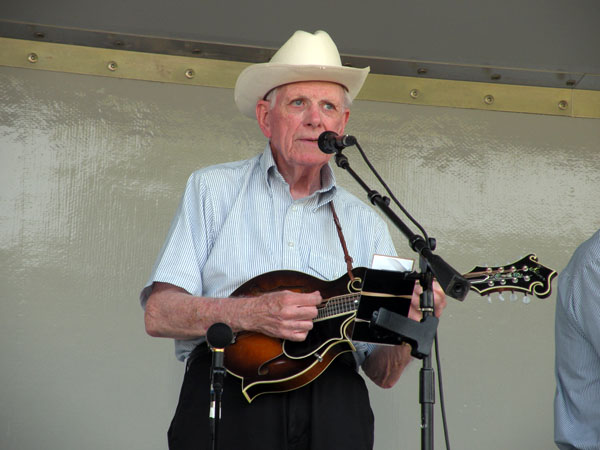
- Martin in 2012

Background information
- Born: William D. Colleran; April 26, 1925; Pittsburgh, Pennsylvania, U.S.
- Died: February 28, 2022 (aged 96) McMurray, Pennsylvania, U.S.
- Genres: Bluegrass, country
- Occupation: Musician
- Instrument(s): Vocals, mandolin, guitar
- Years active: 1948–2022
- Website: http://www.thedixietravelers.com/

William Dermot Colleran (April 26, 1925 – February 28, 2022), better known as Mac Martin was an American bluegrass musician.

== Biography ==
He was born in Pittsburgh, Pennsylvania on April 26, 1925. William "Mac Martin" Colleran used to listen to "hillbilly music" on WWVA and WSM Grand Ole Opry when he was young. Colleran had his first guitar at the age of fifteen. Shortly afterwards, he joined up with Ed Brozi, performing as a duo. After graduating from high school he enlisted in the U.S. Navy and served on the island of Okinawa. In the late 1940s, Colleran formed his first group the Pike County Boys consisting of Bill Higgins, fiddle and Bill Wagner, bass, who began playing regularly on WHJB in Greensburg, Pennsylvania. Because there were three "Bills" in the group, Colleran changed his name to Mac Martin. In 1953, the Pike County Boys left WHJB. In the mid 1950s, Colleran got together with Mike Carson and Billy Bryant and, by 1957, the Dixie Travelers was formed. The newly formed group began performing at Walsh's Lounge in Pittsburgh, Pennsylvania and did so until 1976. Musicians such as Earl Banner, Slim Jones, Frank Batista, Norm Azinger, Bob Artis, Bud Smith, Keith Little, Bobby Martin (Colleran), Tim Custer, Brad Foust and Bob Artis have all been part of the Dixie Travelers. They recorded for Gateway Records and Rural Rhythm Records.

Martin died in McMurray, Pennsylvania, on February 28, 2022, at the age of 96.

== Bibliography ==
- Kristin Baggelaar and Donald Milton. Folk Music: More Than a Song. New York: Thomas Y. Crowell Company, 1976. p. 257-258
