= Eagle Times =

- Type: Daily newspaper
- Format: Broadsheet
- Owner(s): Sunshine Communications, LLC (Jay Lucas)
- Editor: Tyler Mahew
- Headquarters: 27 Pleasant Street; Claremont, New Hampshire 03743
- Country: United States
- Circulation: 9,000 (as of 2021)
- Website: eagletimes.com

The Eagle Times is a daily newspaper based in Claremont, New Hampshire. The paper circulates in Claremont, Charlestown, Cornish, Newport, Plainfield and Unity, New Hampshire, and Ascutney, Springfield, Weathersfield and Windsor, Vermont.

== History ==
The Eagle Times was formed when the Claremont Daily Eagle merged with the Bellows Falls-Springfield Times Reporter in the 1970s. The Eagle Times website went online September 1, 2005. The paper was independently owned by publisher Harvey Hill at this time.

Eagle Publications also owned several weekly and specialty publications, including the Connecticut Valley Spectator of Lebanon, New Hampshire, the Message for the Week of Chester, Vermont, the Weekly Flea, and the Argus Champion. The Argus Champion, which was based in New London, New Hampshire, was discontinued on July 30, 2008, a year prior to the other publications.

The combined papers had 197,445 readers, according to the company's last published rate card before the closure.

On July 9, 2009, the parent company of Eagle Times, Eagle Publications, Inc., filed for Chapter 7 in the U.S. Bankruptcy Court and printed its final edition on July 10, 2009. All of its employees were laid off and all of their remaining newspapers, the Connecticut Valley Spectator, the Weekly Flea, and the Message for the Week, were also discontinued at that time. The website was still accessible until the afternoon of July 14, 2009.

The publisher cited monthly losses, and the shift of readers and advertisers to the internet as reasons for the bankruptcy. It is also believed that the increasing cost of newsprint was partially to blame.

After emerging from bankruptcy in October 2009, the newspaper opened for business again, printing its first new issue Monday, October 12.

On February 23, 2012, the paper restarted its web site, at www.eagletimes.com.

In July 2020, Sunshine Communications, a division of the Sunshine Initiative Public Benefit Corp., acquired the newspaper from Sample News Group. In July 2025, the paper suspended operations due to financial difficulty, but management stopped shorting of saying the paper had ceased.

== Controversy ==
In November 2009, the state of New Hampshire guaranteed 75 percent of a $250,000 loan to the Eagle Times, leading to questions about conflicts of interest and journalistic integrity. The paper's publisher, Harry Hartman, denied any conflict of interest, saying that "No one gets deferential treatment in our newsroom."
