= Spotlight Newspapers =

- Type: Weekly newspaper
- Format: Tabloid
- Owner(s): Community Media Group, LLC
- Founded: 1955
- Headquarters: 341 Delaware Ave. Delmar, NY; United States
- Website: SpotlightNews.com

The Spotlight Newspapers is made up of 3 weekly newspapers in the suburban communities in the Capital District of New York State. The group began in 1955 with The Spotlight.

== History ==
The Spotlight newspaper was first published as a four-page penny saver in Delmar, New York on December 1, 1955.

It was founded by Tracy Walsh out of her home. In 1957, she sold the paper to Robert G. King, a former advertising salesman at the Times Union. In 1975, Nathaniel A. Boynton, a former Associated Presswriter, purchased the paper. Boynton stopped the free distribution of the paper and promoted subscription sales.

In 1980, Boynton sold the paper to Richard Ahlstrom, a retired vice-president of Westchester-Rockland Newspapers owned by Gannett. Ahlstrom turned The Spotlight into an 11- by 15-inch tabloid format, which allowed him to nearly double the news layout and photo content of the paper. He also started the Colonie and Loudonville editions of The Spotlight.

In 1998, Ahlstrom sold the papers to Eagle Newspapers in 1998, which formed Spotlight, LLC. Spotlight, LLC expanded through purchases of existing newspapers and start-ups in areas without local newspapers to a dozen weekly newspapers by 2007. Papers in Rotterdam, NY, Niskayuna, Scotia-Glenville, Clifton Park Guilderland, Burnt Hills, NY, Malta, NY, Milton and the City of Saratoga Springs were established.

On October 1, 2009, Spotlight Newspapers and its parent company Eagle Newspapers were sold to Community Media Group, LLC.
