= The Sentinel (Pennsylvania) =

American daily newspaper

- A sample front page of The Sentinel
- Type: Daily newspaper
- Format: Broadsheet
- Owner: Lee Enterprises
- Publisher: Kim Kamowski
- Editor: Jeff Pratt
- Founded: 1861; 165 years ago
- Headquarters: 327 B St. Carlisle, Pennsylvania, U.S. 17013
- Circulation: 6,477 Daily (as of 2023)
- Website: cumberlink.com

The Sentinel is a daily newspaper based in Carlisle, Pennsylvania, serving the Harrisburg–Carlisle metropolitan area.

== History ==
In 2012, the newspaper launched a partnership with abc27 News in Harrisburg, Pennsylvania. The media outlets coordinate and share news coverage. Also that year, The Sentinel expanded its print edition to include weekly local sections about food, health, outdoors, faith, entertainment, and history; a daily local opinion page; and a daily "Capital Region" page with news from Harrisburg and its suburbs.

In 2013, the newspaper's circulation rose when the nearby Patriot-News reduced its print distribution from seven days per week to three. It opened a bureau in the state Capitol Complex in Harrisburg with Calkins Media, which provides statehouse news coverage to The Sentinel and Calkins Media's newspapers across Pennsylvania.

Starting June 27, 2023, the print edition of The Sentinel will be reduced to three days a week: Tuesday, Thursday and Saturday. Also, the newspaper will transition from being delivered by a traditional newspaper delivery carrier to mail delivery by the U.S. Postal Service.

== See also ==
- List of newspapers in Harrisburg
- List of newspapers in Pennsylvania
