= Pennsylvania Business Central =

- Type: Biweekly newspaper
- Owner(s): Sample News Group
- Publisher: David Wells
- Editor: David Harry
- Founded: 1990
- Headquarters: 1001 University Drive; State College, PA; United States
- Circulation: 12,500 monthly
- Website: pabusinesscentral.com

Pennsylvania Business Central is a monthly business journal covering 23 counties in central Pennsylvania, both in print and on the Web. It is also published alternately with The Marcellus Business Central, which is dedicated to the Marcellus Shale gas play in Pennsylvania, eastern Ohio and northern West Virginia. The newspaper focuses on one or more Lists in every edition that are of interest to the B2B community. Important focuses are the Top 100 People, Top 100 Organizations, Foremost Under 40 and Women in Business lists. Additional publications include the annual Book of Lists, Marcellus Directory and more.

It covers business in the following Central Pennsylvania counties: Beaver, Bedford, Blair, Bradford, Cambria, Centre, Clearfield, Clinton, Fayette, Greene, Huntingdon, Indiana, Juniata, Lycoming, Mifflin, Northumberland, Snyder, Somerset, Susquehanna, Tioga, Union, Westmoreland, and Washington.

Current owner Sample News Group acquired the publication in 2007.

== See also ==
- List of newspapers in Pennsylvania
