= The Daily News (Batavia) =

Newspaper published in Batavia

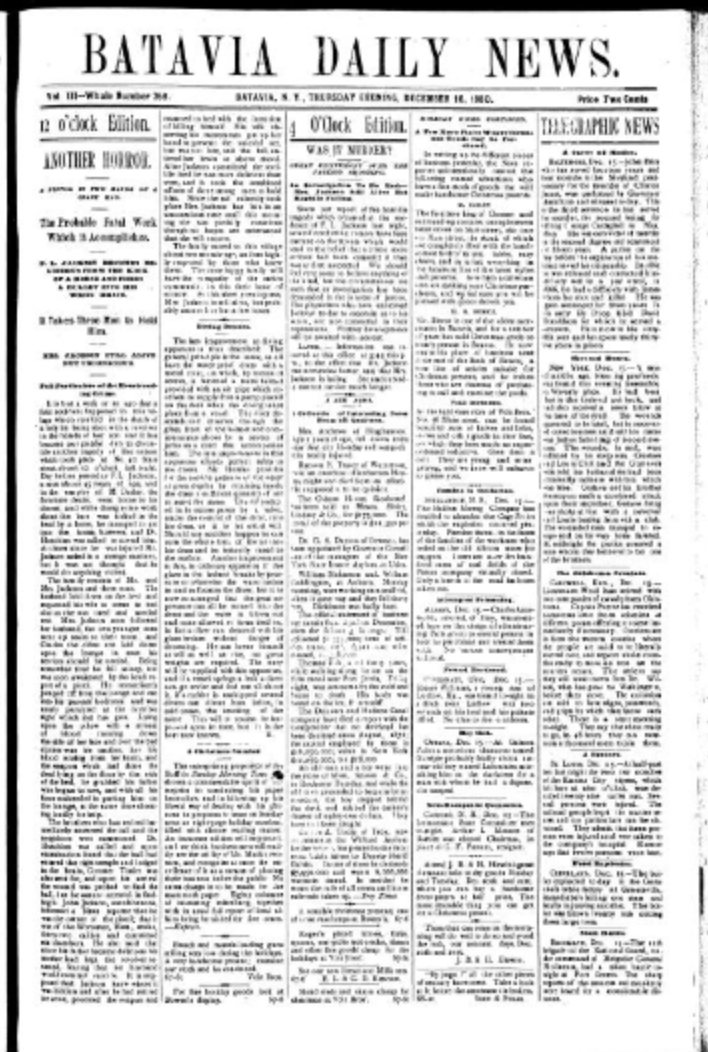
- Batavia Daily News, December 16, 1880
- Type: Daily newspaper, except Sunday, Monday
- Format: Broadsheet
- Owner: Sample News Group
- Publisher: Heather Zerillo
- Editor: Ben Beagle
- Founded: June 25, 1878
- Language: American English
- Headquarters: Batavia, New York
- Country: United States
- Circulation: 7,758 (as of 2017)
- ISSN: 1536-6901
- OCLC number: 9659012
- Website: thedailynewsonline.com

The Daily News is an American, English language newspaper serving Batavia, New York, and surrounding environs. Originally billed as the "Official Paper of the Village", it was known as The Batavia Daily News from 1879 through 1881, and the Daily Morning News from 1878 to 1879.

Published from the county seat of Genesee County, the paper also serves portions of neighboring Wyoming and Orleans counties. It is published five days a week, Tuesday through Saturday. It is currently owned by Sample News Group.

== History ==
The Daily News began publication on 25 June 1878. Its publishers were brothers Malcolm D. Mix and Samuel Mix, and its editor was W.H. Brandish.

In 1881, Gerrit S. Griswold and partner Andrew J. McWain purchased the paper for $2,750. Griswold was the paper's publisher until 1938. A prominent member of the community, he was one of the charter members of the Associated Press and its one-time president.

In 1897, the Daily News bought The Batavian, a rival weekly that had operated since 1868. Enlarging it, they turned it from an independent paper to a Republican one.

In 1981, the Johnson Newspaper Corporation of Watertown, New York, purchased The Daily News.

In 1984, The Daily News won a USA Today printing contract for regional printing of USA Today serving Western New York, resulting in a printing plant expansion. This contract ended in summer 2009.

Tom Turnbull was publisher from 2002 to 2013. On 17 February 2010, the Batavia Daily News joined the YouTube Channel. Then on 30 August the Buffalo News started to print the Batavia Daily News among other papers.

On 20 September 2014, the newspaper's historic headquarters building was sold to an outside buyer. During 2015, long time Managing Editor Mark Graczyk left and was succeeded by Tiffany Towner; in September 2017, John Anderson replaced Towner as managing editor. Then later in 2019 Ben Beagle took over the job.

The Batavia Daily News switched in 2019 from publishing six days a week to a five day cycle, Tuesday–Saturday.

A 2009 poll in The Batavian, an online news site and a competitor to the Batavia Daily News founded in 2008, indicated that 37.2 percent of respondents felt that partisanship did not figure into The Daily News coverage, while 23.4 percent of respondents felt it leaned Republican, and 17.9 percent felt it leaned Democrat. 21.1 percent answered, "not sure."

On 1 May 2023, Sample News Group of Huntingdon, Pennsylvania, purchased The Daily News.

On 2 November 2024, The Daily News established the Le Roy Weekend Gazette, a weekly newspaper covering Le Roy, New York, with Samuel Zerillo as associate editor.

== Awards and recognition ==
Tiffany Towner, a former managing editor at The Daily News, was selected for Editor & Publisher's 2017 "25 under 35" list of the “next generation of newspaper publishing leaders.”

In 2017, The Daily News gained recognition at the New York Press Association's Better Newspaper Awards in a number of categories, including second place in Division Three editorials and first place in Division Three feature photos.
