= The Eagle (newspaper) =

The Eagle is the name of the following daily newspapers:

== Active ==
- The Berkshire Eagle, Pittsfield, Massachusetts
- The Bryan-College Station Eagle, Bryan, Texas
- Butler Eagle, Butler, Pennsylvania
- Dothan Eagle, Dothan, Alabama
- Reading Eagle, Reading, Pennsylvania
- The Wichita Eagle, Wichita, Kansas

== Other ==
- The Eagle, Washington, D.C., an American University student-run online newspaper
- The Eagle, many in the List of newspapers in Michigan

== Defunct ==
- Brooklyn Eagle (1841–1955), Brooklyn, New York
- California Eagle (1879–1964), an African-American newspaper in Los Angeles, California
- The Eagle (Queensland) (1893–1906), Charters Towers, Australia

== Newspaper publishers ==
- Eagle Newspapers (New York), a newspaper publisher
- Eagle Newspapers (Oregon), a newspaper publisher
