= Cortland Standard =

Daily newspaper published in Cortland, New York

- Type: Daily newspaper
- Owner: Sample News Group
- Founder: Francis G. Kinney
- Publisher: Mindy Lawrence
- Founded: June 25, 1867
- Language: English
- Ceased publication: March 13, 2025
- Relaunched: May 17, 2025
- Headquarters: 110 Main St, Cortland, NY 13045
- OCLC number: 17629201
- Website: cortlandstandard.com

The Cortland Standard is a digital and print newspaper covering the Cortland, New York area. The newspaper was founded on June 25, 1867. It ceased in March 2025 and was relaunched two months later under new ownership.

== History ==
The Standard was founded in 1867 by Francis G. Kinney. In 1876, the newspaper was purchased by William H. Clark, who became the first of five generations of his family to run the paper. In 2024, the paper was added to New York State's historic business registry.

The newspaper closed on March 1, 2025 with proposed tariffs on Canada, which would raise the cost of news print cited as a major contributing factor. At the time, it was one of the five oldest family-owned newspapers in the United States. As a result of the newspaper's closure, the Cortland area became a news desert. Sample News Group acquired the assets of the defunct Cortland Standard and announced plans to relaunch the paper. It resumed print publication on May 17, 2025.
