= Barre Montpelier Times Argus =

Vermont newspaper

- Type: Daily newspaper
- Format: Broadsheet
- Owner: Sample News Group
- Publisher: R. John Mitchell
- Editor: Steven Pappas
- Founded: 1897
- Headquarters: Barre, Vermont, U.S.
- Circulation: 4,500 (as of 2021)
- Website: timesargus.com

The Barre Montpelier Times Argus is a daily newspaper serving the capital region of Vermont. The circulation area includes Washington, Orange, Lamoille, Addison, Caledonia, and parts of Chittenden, Franklin, Orleans and Windsor counties.

== History ==
The Times Argus is the product of a union of the Barre Daily Times and the Montpelier Evening Argus in 1959. The Barre Times was founded by Frank E. Langley, a printer from Wilmot, New Hampshire. Langley and his wife printed the paper out of their house, with a news policy of "Barre first and the rest of the world after." The first edition came out on March 16, 1897, and cost one cent. Langley's son remembered playing on the floor while Mrs. Langley set type in their Barre home.

In 1917, Langley encouraged his employees to become partners, and upon his death in 1938 six men became shareholders, including Alex Walker. Walker bought out his partners in 1958, and purchased the Montpelier Argus on August 29, 1959. The first Barre-Montpelier Times Argus was published on August 30, 1959.

The Montpelier Argus was struggling financially when it was purchased, working with an antiquated press and a dilapidated building (the Times Argus has a Montpelier office in the same building that once housed the Argus, at 112 Main Street in Montpelier. Currently the office houses the Vermont Press Bureau and the Montpelier reporter for the Times Argus).

Founded as the weekly Argus-Patriot in 1863 by Hiram Atkins, the Argus became a daily on October 30, 1897. The first edition cost one cent, and included this proposition: "... know how to make a newspaper, and one which will merit the name and prove a credit to the city of Montpelier." By then it was owned by Atkins' son Morris, who assumed ownership when his father died in 1893. Morris Atkins passed on the newspaper to his daughter Elaine in the 1940s. At that time, the newspaper had an all-female reporting staff due to World War II. One of these women, Doris Jones, started at the Argus in 1945 and was employed by the newspaper until 1995.

In 1959, the newspaper was bought by Walker, who then sold the combined newspaper to Robert W. Mitchell and Gene Noble, owners of the Rutland Herald, in 1963. In 1979, Robert's son R. John became publisher of the Times Argus. Mitchell and his son R. John bought out the Noble family in 1986, and the newspaper remained family-owned for some time.

In 2015, R. John Mitchell turned over publishing duties of the Times Argus to Catherine Nelson who had been vice president and CEO of the paper. R. John stayed connected to the newspaper by continuing to serve as the president and chairman of the board of directors while his son, Rob Mitchell, became editor-in-chief.

In 2016, the Times Argus and Rutland Herald were sold to Reade Brower of Maine and Chip Harris of New Hampshire. Earlier in the year, both papers had cut back their publication frequency from a daily cycle to four days per week. In 2018, Brower and Harris sold the Times Argus and Rutland Herald to Sample News Group.

In 2020, the Times Argus stopped printing the Waterbury Reader, which it had offered as a free community paper for two years.
