= WBVE =

- Bedford, Pennsylvania; United States
- Broadcast area: Bedford, Pennsylvania; Bedford County, Pennsylvania
- Frequency: 107.5 MHz
- Branding: B-Rock 107.5

Programming
- Format: Classic rock
- Affiliations: Fox News Radio; Pittsburgh Steelers Radio Network; Radio Pennsylvania

Ownership
- Owner: Cessna Communications, Inc.
- Sister stations: WRAX, WAYC, WBFD

History
- First air date: August 15, 1988
- Former call signs: WAYC-FM (1988–1994); WWCW (1994–2000)

Technical information
- Licensing authority: FCC
- Facility ID: 10069
- Class: A
- ERP: 1000 watts
- HAAT: 399 meters (1,309 ft)
- Transmitter coordinates: 40°0′46.0″N 78°33′12.0″W

Links
- Public license information: Public file; LMS
- Website: B-Rock 107.5

WBVE is a Classic Rock formatted broadcast radio station licensed to Bedford, Pennsylvania, serving Bedford and Bedford County in Pennsylvania. WBVE is owned and operated by Cessna Communications, Inc.
