= Slovenian Environment Agency =

Coordinates: 46°3′54.78″N 14°30′48.65″E

The Slovenian Environment Agency (Slovenian: Agencija Republike Slovenije za okolje or ARSO) is the main organisation for environment of the Republic of Slovenia. It was established in 2001 with a reorganisation of the Hydrometeorological Institute of Slovenia. Since 2012, it is part of the Ministry of Agriculture and the Environment; before, it was part of the Ministry of the Environment and Spatial Planning. As of May 2012, its director general is Silvo Žlebir. The range of duties of this organisation are in the field of monitoring, analysing and forecasting of natural phenomena and processes in the environment and reduction of the danger to people and their property as follows:

- national service for meteorology
- national service for hydrology
- national service for seismology
- monitoring of the pollution of the environment and the provision of quality public environmental data
- exercise the requirements for the protection of the environment, which result from forcing regulations, conservation of natural resources, biodiversity and the provision of sustainable development of the country.
