= WBFD =

- Bedford, Pennsylvania; United States
- Broadcast area: Bedford County, Pennsylvania
- Frequency: 1310 kHz
- Branding: "NewsTalk 1310 WBFD"

Programming
- Format: News/Talk and Sports
- Affiliations: Fox News Radio; Compass Media Networks; Premiere Networks; Radio Pennsylvania; Salem Radio Network; Westwood One; Pittsburgh Panthers

Ownership
- Owner: Cessna Communications, Inc.
- Sister stations: WRAX, WAYC, WBVE

History
- First air date: July 2, 1955; 70 years ago
- Former call signs: WBFD (?-1993); WAYC (1993–1997); WOOX (1997–2000)
- Call sign meaning: Bedford

Technical information
- Licensing authority: FCC
- Facility ID: 10071
- Class: D
- Power: 1,000 watts (day); 85 watts (night)
- Transmitter coordinates: 40°2′34.99″N 78°30′11.96″W
- Translator: 98.7 W254DF (Bedford)

Links
- Public license information: Public file; LMS
- Website: www.bedfordcountyradio.com/links/WBFD-1310-98-7.html

WBFD (1310 AM) is a Talk and Sports radio formatted broadcast radio station licensed to Bedford, Pennsylvania, and serving Bedford County, Pennsylvania. WBFD is owned and operated by Cessna Communications, Inc.

WBFD also broadcasts on FM translator W254DF on 98.7 MHz in Bedford.
