= The News-Item =

Newspaper in Pennsylvania, US

News-Item
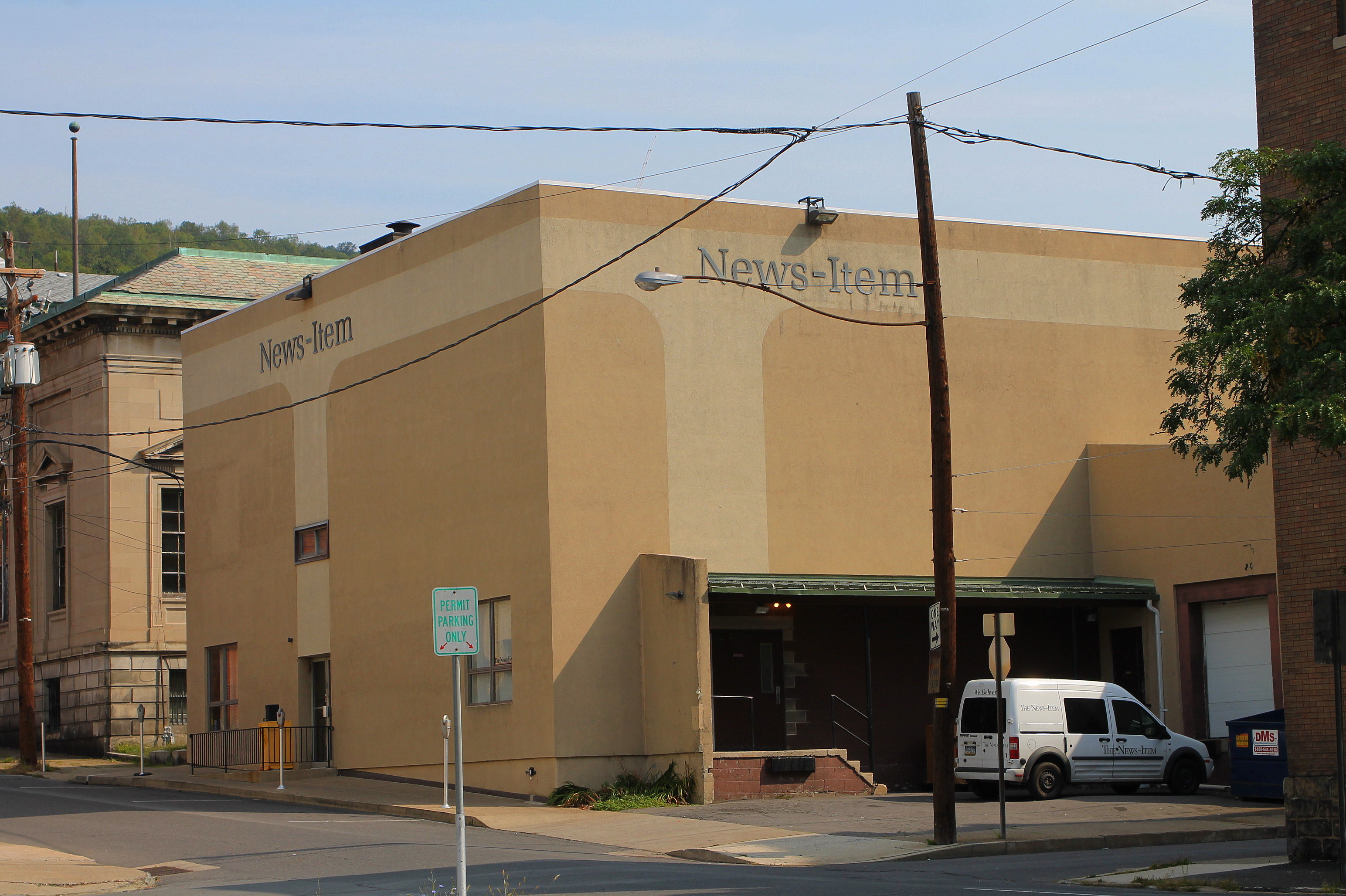
- News-Item headquarters in Shamokin
- Type: Daily newspaper
- Format: Broadsheet
- Owner: Sample News Group
- Publisher: Amy Moyer
- Managing editor: Tim Zyla
- Founded: 1969
- Language: American English
- City: Shamokin
- Country: United States
- Circulation: 7,817 (as of 2021)
- ISSN: 2158-9410
- OCLC number: 14088698
- Website: newsitem.com

The News-Item is the main newspaper serving the City of Shamokin, Pennsylvania, and the surrounding areas. It is based in Shamokin.

== History ==
On October 1, 2015, Sample News Group acquired The News-Item and other properties from Times-Shamrock Communications.
