= WAYC =

- Bedford, Pennsylvania; United States
- Broadcast area: Bedford, Pennsylvania; Bedford County, Pennsylvania
- Frequency: 100.9 MHz
- Branding: Star 100.9

Programming
- Format: Hot adult contemporary
- Affiliations: Fox News Radio; Radio Pennsylvania

Ownership
- Owner: Cessna Communications, Inc.
- Sister stations: WRAX, WBFD, WBVE

History
- First air date: December 22, 1966
- Former call signs: WAKM (1966–1980); WRAX (1980–1993); WOOX (1993–1997); WAYC-FM (1997–1997); WAYC (1997–2009); WAYC-FM (2009–2020)

Technical information
- Licensing authority: FCC
- Facility ID: 10070
- Class: A
- ERP: 500 watts
- HAAT: 390 meters (1,280 ft)
- Transmitter coordinates: 40°0′46.0″N 78°33′12.0″W

Links
- Public license information: Public file; LMS
- Website: WAYC online

WAYC (100.9 FM) is a hot adult contemporary formatted radio station licensed to Bedford, Pennsylvania, serving Beford and Bedford County in Pennsylvania. WAYC is owned and operated by Cessna Communications, Inc.

== WAKM-FM ==
WAKM 100.9 launched on December 22, 1966 as an easy listening station with the tagline "Broadcasting the finest in Music, News, Sports, and Entertainment". The station initially was on-air from 7 a.m. until 1 a.m. every day. The WAKM studios were located in the Penn Bedford Hotel. The station was owned by Fort Bedford Enterprises which also operated WKMC in Roaring Spring. WAKM was sold to the Inquirer Printing Company in 1968 for $54,000. WAKM began broadcasting local sporting events in addition to easy listening programming in 1970. In 1976, WAKM-FM was sold to Bedford Broadcasting for $265,000. The station became part of The Penn State Radio Network in the 1970s.

== WRAX ==
WAKM 100.9 changed call signs to WRAX in 1980. In the 1980s, the station changed formats to country music. WRAX kept its country music format into the 1990s.

== WOOX ==
In 1993, WRAX again changed call signs, this time to WOOX-FM. The station played an oldies format until 1997 when WOOX was moved to AM.

== WAYC ==
On July 1, 1997, 24-hour talk radio station WAYC-AM moved to 100.9 FM and assumed the call sign WAYC-FM and switched formats to adult soft rock. WAYC later changed to a hot adult contemporary format.
