= Potter Leader-Enterprise =

- Type: Weekly newspaper
- Owner(s): Community Media Group / Tioga Publishing Group
- Publisher: Philip Husick II
- Editor: Recommended
- Founded: 1875
- Headquarters: 6 2nd Street, Coudersport, Pennsylvania United States
- Circulation: 6,000
- ISSN: 0895-6839
- OCLC number: 16729019
- Website: tiogapublishing.com/potter_leader_enterprise/

The Potter Leader-Enterprise is an American weekly newspaper serving Coudersport, Pennsylvania, with a circulation of over 6,000 copies. It is published weekly on Wednesdays. The paper is owned by Community Media Group, Inc.

== History ==
The Potter Enterprise was founded by F. W, Knox and W. W. Thompson and several others in 1875. The paper had 24 stockholders, residents of county holding 151 shares. By 1880, W.W. Thompson became sole owner of the paper's shares. The paper was purchased by David Butterworth in December 1886. Butterworth had previously published the Potter County Journal for 9 years. Under his "clever management" Potter Enterprise became the leading paper in the county.

Butterworth died suddenly in 1901 and his son sold the paper to M.J. Ostrander, who made the paper into a strict Republican newspaper. M.T. Stokes joined the paper as publisher and editor around 1903 and became known for his "aggressive politics and fearless opposition to many interests, business and political." Stokes made many enemies during his time at the paper, and is reported to have been kicked down by a bank president, horsewhipped by a woman, and paddled by a printer. There were also numerous libel suits against the paper while it was under Stokes. Things became so bad that in 1913, "political antagonists" set off dynamite in the Potter Enterprise printing plant. Stokes ran for Congress as a Washington Party candidate in 1914, but was labeled as a joke. Stokes was accused of blackguardism when he used the Potter Enterprise to abuse his Congressional opponent. In 1920, Stokes sold his interests in the paper in 1920, and the Potter Enterprise continued to be the top paper in the county.

Stokes sold the paper to A.A. Bernard and William Fish, who were owners of the rival Potter Democrat. The paper stayed with the Fish family for a number of years. Bill Fish Jr. became co-owner of the paper in 1957, along with his wife Jill, after having worked at the paper since he was in high school. In 1958, the Enterprise acquired the Galeton Leader Dispatch. After Bill Fish Jr. died in 1977, Jill remained as the publisher of the paper until she sold it in 1983. The paper was purchase by Stauffer Media, though Fish Sr.'s grandson, Paul Heimel, was appointed editor of the paper. In 1986, Heimel left the Enterprise to work at the Potter County Leader and soon after, the Leader Publishing Company purchased the Enterprise. The paper was renamed as the Potter Leader-Enterprise.

The paper was purchased by Community Media Group and is operated under its Tioga Publishing Group. In 2017, Philip Husick II was named Publisher for the Tioga Publishing Group.

In 2018, The Potter Leader-Enterprise was named one of the eight best newspapers in Pennsylvania.

== Notable Coverage ==
In 2010, The Potter Leader-Enterprise broke the news that the company Adelphia Communications Corporation was involved in illegal activity. The paper published a full securities filing that detailed illegal activities by the company and founder John Rigas and his sons. John Rigas and one of his sons, Timothy, were sentenced to 15 and 20 years of prison, respectively.
