= Hydrometeorological Institute of Slovenia =

Hydrometeorological Institute of Slovenia (Slovene: Hidrometeorološki zavod Slovenije, HMZ) was the national hydrological and meteorological service of Slovenia. It was founded of 15 April 1947 by the then Socialist Republic of Slovenia.

On the day of establishment to it passed the then hydrological and meteorological stations and institutions on the territory of the Republic of Slovenia, with the exception of stations of the federal (Yugoslavian) interest.

The Hydrometeorological Institute of Slovenia was in 2001 transformed into the Slovenian Environment Agency.
