= Ambler Gazette =

American weekly newspaper in Ambler, Pennsylvania

- Type: Weekly newspaper
- Owner(s): Digital First Media
- Publisher: Edward S. Condra
- Editor: Ann Cornell
- Founded: 1882
- Headquarters: 307 Derstine Ave., Lansdale, Pennsylvania, United States
- Circulation: 7,000
- OCLC number: 13448090
- Website: www.montgomerynews.com/amblergazette/

The Ambler Gazette is a weekly newspaper serving Ambler, Pennsylvania and the surrounding community. It has a circulation of 7,000. It is owned by Digital First Media.

== History ==
Founded in 1882, six years before the borough of Ambler was incorporated, the Gazette was the successor to the Ambler Times, which had been founded in 1879 by Dr. Rose. Irwin S. Weber took over the paper in 1882 and renamed it Ambler Gazette. Arthur K. Thomas took over the paper in 1885 and, in 1886, after a fire destroyed the paper's printing plant, he opened a larger printing facility. In 1898 Thomas sold the Gazette to J. Morris Haywood. Haywood ran the paper for more than 38 years. Mrs. J. Maurice Haywood (Elizabeth Godfrey Haywood) continued to publish the paper until her death in 1951.

In 1952, Bill Strasburg purchased the Gazette. He later founded the Montgomery Publishing company in 1954, and over time purchased 15 local weeklies. He sold the company in 1989.

In 2001, the Montgomery Publishing Company was sold to Journal Register Co., which was later acquired by Digital First Media which, in turn, is owned by the hedge fund Alden Global Capital. After the sale of the company to Journal Register Co., former Publisher Arthur W. Howe sued his former business partners for allegedly cutting him out of profits from the sale.
