= Bedford Gazette =

American daily newspaper in Bedford, Pennsylvania

- Type: Daily newspaper
- Format: Broadsheet
- Owner: Sample News Group
- Founder: Charles M'Dowell
- Publisher: Joseph A. Beegle
- Managing editor: Ryan Spring
- Founded: 1805
- Language: English
- Headquarters: Bedford, Pennsylvania
- Circulation: 10,000
- Website: bedfordgazette.com

The Bedford Gazette is an American daily newspaper serving Bedford, Pennsylvania, with a circulation of approximately 10,000 copies. It is run by Sample News Group.

== History ==
Launched as a Federalist weekly on September 21, 1805, its founder McDowell sold the paper in 1832, to George W. Bowman, a Jacksonian Democrat who supported James Buchanan, a fellow Pennsylvanian Democrat. Early on, the paper developed a reputation for fanning the flames of racial hatred. An article in 1837 claimed that free blacks, under the influence of Thaddeus Stevens, had broken into the voting polls, and threatened to shoot those trying to stop them from voting. During the Civil War, they lamented that the Fugitive Slave Act was not being enforced in Pennsylvania.

Bowman in turn sold the operation to Benjamin Franklin Meyers in August 1857. Myers, a disciple of Stephen Douglas and supporter of Buchanan, was hailed by his contemporaries as a gifted literary stylist with a "trenchant pen", though more recent evaluations have noted that his vitriolic editorials and articles vilifying Lincoln and abolition "make for difficult reading today." His reputation with Buchanan was such that when Buchanan was being pressured to run for president again in 1859, he chose to announce his rejection of those calls in a letter sent to the Gazette.

In 1974, the paper made headlines when Representative Bud Schuster, who had been the target of a number of investigations by the Gazette, offered to buy paper, in what some saw as an attempt to silence reporting.

In 2000, the paper was sold by the Frear family to the Sample family for an undisclosed sum.
