= The Gettysburg Times =

Daily newspaper in Gettysburg, Pennsylvania

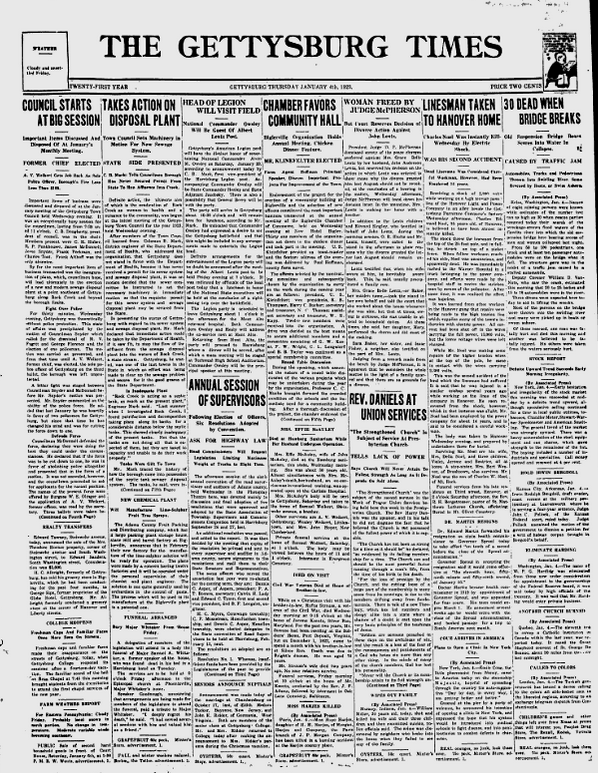
- Historical front page (January 4, 1923)
- Type: Daily newspaper
- Format: Broadsheet
- Owner(s): Sample News Group, LLC; Gettysburg Times Publishing LLC
- Publisher: Wayne Lowman
- President: Joe Beegle
- Editor-in-chief: Andy Andrews
- General manager: Kyle Smith
- Photo editor: Darryl Wheeler
- Staff writers: Liz Caples; Richard Franki
- Founded: January 1, 1902
- Language: English
- Headquarters: Gettysburg, Pennsylvania
- City: Gettysburg
- Country: United States
- Circulation: 10,000 (as of 2023)
- OCLC number: 12443209
- Website: gettysburgtimes.com

The Gettysburg Times is an American newspaper in Gettysburg, Pennsylvania, owned by the Sample News Group. It is published daily, except for Sundays, Christmas Day, and New Year's Day.

The Times was founded in 1902 as The Progress, but is also the successor to prior newspapers going back to the Adams Centinel which was founded in 1800 and was the first newspaper in Adams County.

== History ==
In September 1902, Madison Alexander Garvin started The Progress. By 1905, it was renamed The Gettysburg Times.

The Adams Centinel was founded by Robert Harper in November 1800 as the first newspaper of any kind in the county. It was a weekly. The wording of "Centinel" was later changed to "Sentinel". In 1867, the Sentinel combined with the Star (founded in 1828) to become the Star and Sentinel. The Times and News Publishing Company, then owner of the Gettysburg Times, took over the Star and Sentinel in 1920, and it published as a weekly until 1961. The Gettysburg Compiler, founded in 1818, was also acquired by the Times' owner.

The Sample News Group, then owner of 12 papers, acquired the paper in early 2013 from the Jones family, after longtime publisher Phil Jones died in 2011.
