= The Pennsylvania Journal =

18th-century American weekly newspaper published by William Bradford

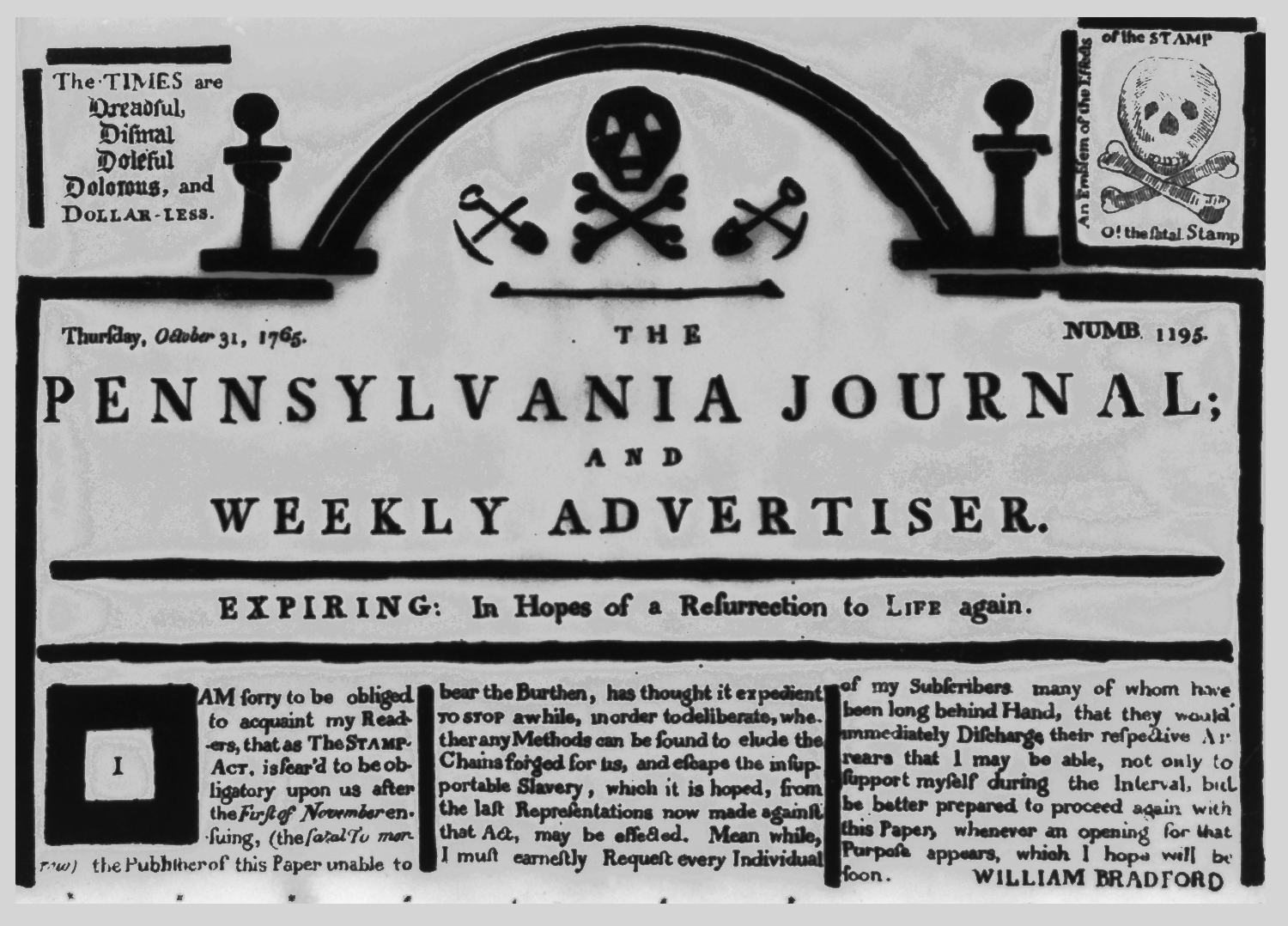
Masthead of The Pennsylvania Journal (October 31, 1765)

The Pennsylvania Journal was an American weekly newspaper published by William Bradford during the 18th century.

The first edition of The Pennsylvania Journal appeared in December 1742. A famous contributor was Thomas Paine, who published his first-ever journalism in the Journal in 1775 and contributed a series of pamphleteering essays entitled The American Crisis from December 1776 onwards. After Bradford's death in 1791, his son and business partner Thomas Bradford continued the journal, eventually changing its name to the True American.
