= The Leader Vindicator =

Weekly newspaper in New Bethlehem, Pennsylvania

- Type: Weekly newspaper
- Format: Broadsheet
- Owner: Independent Publications
- Founder: S.C Hepler
- Publisher: Pat Patterson
- Editor: Josh Walzak
- Founded: 1929
- Language: English
- Headquarters: New Bethlehem, Pennsylvania
- Circulation: 4,300
- Website: www.thecourierexpress.com/the_leader_vindicator/

The Leader-Vindicator is a weekly newspaper serving New Bethlehem, Pennsylvania and the surrounding community.

It is owned by Independent Publications, under the Community Media Group of Frankfort, Illinois. According to the American Newspaper Representatives, the newspaper has a paid circulation of approximately 4,300 copies.

== History ==
The paper is the result of the 1929 merger of the New Bethlehem Vindicator and the Bethlehem Leader. The New Bethlehem Vindicator was founded in 1879 as a seven column Independent paper, expanding to eight pages in 1880. It was sold by Ed Himes to S.C. Hepler of the slightly older Bethlehem Leader in 1929, and the papers were merged into a single paper, making it the only local paper available in Bethlehem.

The paper was bought from L. O. Hepler, by Tom T. Andrews in 1947. Counting his work at the Bethlehem Leader Hepler had at that point been editor and later publisher of the weekly newspaper for almost forty-five years.

In 1953, Herbert Phillips was appointed editor, succeeding his father B. E. Philipps .

The paper was sold to James Shaffer in 1986, but Andrews stayed on as co-publisher until his death in 1996. After the death of Andrews, Shaffer sold the company to McLean Publishing, a company run by a family that owned other local papers. The paper was put under the Independent Publishers Group.

In 2013, McLean Publishing's holdings under the Independent Publishers group were sold to Community Media, including The Leader Vindicator.
