= The Standard-Journal (Milton, Pennsylvania) =

American newspaper

- The Voice of Your Hometown
- Type: Daily newspaper
- Format: Broadsheet
- Owner: Sample News Group
- Founder: William Penn Hastings
- Publisher: Amy Moyer
- Editor: Kevin Mertz
- Founded: 1890
- Headquarters: 21 N Arch Street, Milton, Pennsylvania, U.S.
- Website: www.standard-journal.com

The Standard-Journal is an American daily newspaper published in Milton, Pennsylvania. It is owned by Sample News Group.

== History ==
The newspaper was founded by William Penn Hastings on Jan. 23, 1890. In 1997, Hollinger Inc. sold the paper to Liberty Group Publishing. In June 2005, Fortress Investment Group bought Liberty and changed its name to GateHouse Media. The company sold The Standard-Journal to Sample News Group in September 2008.
