= The Wayne Independent =

Newspaper published in Honesdale, Pennsylvania

- Type: Daily newspaper
- Format: Broadsheet
- Owner: Gannett
- Publisher: Michelle Fleece
- Editor: Melissa Lee
- Founded: February 7, 1878; 148 years ago, as Wayne Semi-Weekly Independent
- Ceased publication: 2019
- Headquarters: 220 Eighth Street, Honesdale, Pennsylvania 18431, United States
- Circulation: 2,500 daily
- ISSN: 0899-479X
- Website: WayneIndependent.com

The Wayne Independent was an American daily newspaper published Tuesdays through Saturdays in Honesdale, Pennsylvania. It was owned by Gannett.

It was the only daily serving Wayne County, Pennsylvania. It was founded as a semiweekly publication in 1878.

== History ==
In 1986, the newspaper was purchased by Roy H. Park and his media conglomerate Park Communications.
