= Indiana Gazette =

Daily newspaper

- Type: Daily newspaper
- Owner: Sample News Group
- Founded: 1890
- Headquarters: Water Street, Indiana, Pennsylvania, United States
- Circulation: 10,500 (as of 2021)
- Website: indianagazette.com

The Indiana Gazette is a newspaper in Indiana, Pennsylvania. It is delivered daily except for holidays and special occasions.

== History ==
The Indiana Gazette was established by the Ray family 1890, and is printed by Indiana Printing and Publishing. The Indiana Printing and Publishing Company came to the Donnelly family when Joe Donnelly, father of current president Michael J. Donnelly, married into the Ray family. Joseph Donnelly wed Lucille Ray, daughter of the generation of Rays that founded the then-titled the Indiana Evening Gazette. Joseph and Lucy had three children, Hastie, Stacie and Michael.
