= Eagle Newspapers (New York) =

New York community newspapers

Coordinates: 43.0686°N 76.1119°W

- Type: Community weeklies, specialty publications newspaper
- Format: Tabloid
- Owner: Sample News Group
- Founded: 1993 (Merger of Brown Newspapers and Manlius Publishing)
- Headquarters: 2501 James Street, Suite 100; Syracuse, New York 13206; U.S.
- Circulation: 144,000 readers each week
- Website: eaglenewsonline.com

Eagle Newspapers is company that publishes five community newspapers and several niche publications serving Syracuse, New York and Central New York.

== History ==
In 1993, Eagle Newspapers formed when the Brown Newspapers in Baldwinsville and Manlius Publishing Co. in Fayetteville merged. In 1998, the company purchased Spotlight Newspapers in Albany, a group of 10 suburban weeklies.

In 2009, John McIntyre, David Tyler and Daniel Alexander formed Community Media Group, LLC. to buy the Spotlight and Eagle Newspaper chains.

In 2012, Eagle Newspapers laid off two reporters and closed The Eagle CNY. That same year, the company switched from paid subscriptions to free home delivery. In 2025, Community Media Group sold Eagle News Group to Sample News Group. In 2026, the company started charging for home delivery and digital access. At that time the total circulation of its five papers was 21,000.

== Publications ==
- Baldwinsville Messenger - serving Baldwinsville, Lysander and Van Buren
- Cazenovia Republican - serving the town and village of Cazenovia
- Eagle Observer - serving town/village of Camillus, Marcellus, Elbridge and village of Jordan
- Eagle Bulletin - serving Manlius, Fayetteville, Minoa, Kirkville, East Syracuse, DeWitt and Jamesville
- Eagle Star Review - serving Cicero, North Syracuse, Clay and Liverpool. The Clay Insider is also sent exclusively to Clay residents monthly.
- Skaneateles Press - serving Skaneateles and Spafford
