= Bedford County Airport =

- IATA: none; ICAO: KHMZ; FAA LID: HMZ

Summary
- Airport type: Public
- Owner: Bedford County Airport Authority
- Serves: Bedford, Pennsylvania
- Elevation AMSL: 1,162 ft (354 m)
- Coordinates: 40°05′10″N 078°30′48.6″W
- Interactive map of Bedford County Airport

Runways
Direction	Length		Surface
Direction	ft	m	Surface
14/32	5,006	1,526	Asphalt

Statistics (2023)
- Aircraft operations (year ending 1/25/2023): 16,700
- Based aircraft: 22
- Source: Federal Aviation Administration

Bedford County Airport (ICAO: KHMZ, FAA LID: HMZ) is a public airport in Bedford County, Pennsylvania. It is owned by the Bedford County Airport Authority and is five miles north of the borough of Bedford, Pennsylvania. It opened in 1994.

Most U.S. airports use the same three-letter location identifier for the FAA and IATA, but this airport is HMZ to the FAA and has no designation from the IATA.

== Facilities ==
The airport covers 168 acres (68 ha) at an elevation of 1,162 feet (354 m). Its one runway, 14/32, is 5,005 by 75 feet (1,526 x 23 m) asphalt.

In the year ending January 25, 2023, the airport had 16,700 aircraft operations, average 46 per day: 87% general aviation, 9% air taxi and 4% military. 22 aircraft were then based at the airport: 12 single-engine, 1 multi-engine, 7 jet and 2 glider.

== See also ==
- List of airports in Pennsylvania
