= Sample News Group =

American publisher of newspapers

Sample News Group, LLC is an American publisher of newspapers serving suburban and rural markets in the tri-state area of New Jersey, New York, and Pennsylvania, as well as in Vermont. The company is family owned and structured as a limited liability company. According to their website, their address is in State College, Pennsylvania.

== History ==
Sample News Group was founded by George Raymond Sample, Jr. (1924–2008). Sample was married to a woman named Janet. As of October 2022, George "Scoop" Sample (né George Raymond Sample III; born 1952), one of eight children of George Sample Jr., is the CEO. Scoop's hometown is Corry, Pennsylvania. The group is also actively managed by Scoop's wife, Marlene Sample (aka "Sissie" Kane; née Marlene Sue Kane; born 1951).

The family of Joseph Franklin Biddle sold the Joseph F. Biddle Publishing Company to Sample in October 1991; the deal included Huntingdon's Daily News, as well as three other publications.

In 2018, Sample purchased The Times Record and the Journal Tribune from Reade Brower. That same year, Sample acquired two dailies in Vermont, sister papers Rutland Herald and The Times Argus, purchasing them from Vermont Community Media, a company partially owned by Brower. Two other weeklies and some websites were also included in the sale. Brower's company had acquired the two dailies as well as the Rutland Reader and the Central Vermont Reader in 2016; they are now both owned by Sample. Also in 2018, Sample sold its Chester, Vermont paper The Message for the Week to KMA Publishing, who ended its publication.

In early 2022, the group announced they had introduced a new publisher and a new VP of digital development to serve its holdings in southwestern Pennsylvania. later in 2022, the Titusville News-Journal was started by Sample.

The Batavia Daily News and Livingston County News of Livingston County, New York and Genesee County, New York were purchased in 2023, from the Watertown, New York–based Johnson Newspaper Corporation.

In November 2024, the company acquired Bee Group Newspapers from the Measer family.

In May 2025, the company acquired the assets of the defunct Cortland Standard and announced plans to relaunch the paper. In July 2025, Sample purchased Eagle News Group, and The Fulton County News in September 2025.

== Publications ==
The group, as listed on their website in October 2023, owns the following:

=== Dailies ===
==== New York ====
- The Palladium-Times (Oswego)
- The Daily News (Batavia)

==== Pennsylvania ====
- Bedford Gazette (Bedford)
- Indiana Gazette (Indiana)
- Mature Living (Indiana)
- Westmoreland Homes (Indiana)
- Indiana Property (Indiana)
- The Shopper's Guide (Indiana)
- The Daily News (Huntingdon)
- Gettysburg Times (Gettysburg)
- The News Item (Shamokin)
- The Review (Towanda)
- Latrobe Bulletin (Latrobe)
- Monthly Values (Latrobe)
- Morning Times (Sayre)
- Corry Journal (Corry)
- The Standard-Journal (Milton)
- The Daily Herald (Tyrone)
- The Leader Times (Kittanning)
- Monthly Values (Kittanning)
- The Daily Courier (Connellsville)
- Mature Living (Connellsville)

===== Vermont =====
- Rutland Herald (Rutland)
- Barre-Montpelier Times Argus (Barre–Montpelier)

=== Weeklies ===
==== New Jersey ====
- Somers Point Sentinel (Somers Point)
- Upper Township Sentinel (Upper Township)
- Ocean City Sentinel (Ocean City)
- Ocean City Sure Guide (Ocean City)
- Cape May Star and Wave (Cape May)
- Cape May/Wildwood Sure Guide (Cape May)

==== New York ====
- The Valley News (Fulton)
- Livingston County News (Geneseo)
- The Oswego County News (Oswego)

==== Pennsylvania ====
- Mercersburg Journal (Mercersburg)
- Philipsburg Weekender (Philipsburg)
- North East News Journal (North East)
- The Farmers Friend (Towanda)
- Mainline Extra (Ebensburg)
- The Star-Courier (Northern Cambria)
- The Dispatch (Portage)
- The Mainliner (Cresson)
- Mountaineer Herald (Ebensburg)
- The Journal (Nanty Glo)
- Union City Express (Union City)
- Titusville News-Journal (Titusville)
- Forest County News Journal (Tionesta)
- Susquehanna County Weekender (Montrose)
- Susquehanna County Independent (Montrose)
- Shippensburg News Chronicle (Shippensburg)
- The Citizens Standard (Valley View)
- The Valley Times-Star (Newville)
- The Valley Log (Orbisonia)
- Broad Top Bulletin (Broad Top)
- West County News-Journal (Girard)
- The Blairsville Dispatch (Blairsville)
- The Mt. Pleasant Journal (Mount Pleasant)
- The Independent Observer (Scottdale)
- The Ligonier Echo (Ligonier)

===== Vermont =====
- Rutland Reader (Rutland)
- Central Vermont Reader (Barre)
- Vermont Journal (Ludlow)

=== Business ===
==== Pennsylvania ====
- Marcellus Business Central (State College)
- Pennsylvania Business Central (State College)
- Pennsylvania Business Woman (State College)

=== Lifestyle ===
==== Pennsylvania ====
- Centered: Life in Balance (State College)
- State College Magazine (State College)

=== Shopping ===
==== New York ====
- Owego Pennysaver (Owego)
- The Oswego Shopper (Oswego)

==== Pennsylvania ====
- Bargain Street (State College, Pennsylvania)
- Shoppers Guide (Everett)
- Warren County Guide (Warren)
- Trader (Kittanning–Ebensburg)
- Your Local Auto (Kittanning–Ebensburg)
