= WRAX (AM) =

- Bedford, Pennsylvania; United States
- Broadcast area: Bedford, Pennsylvania; Bedford County, Pennsylvania
- Frequency: 1600 kHz
- Branding: RAX 106.5 FM

Programming
- Format: Adult standards
- Affiliations: Fox News Radio; Radio Pennsylvania; Penn State Sports Network

Ownership
- Owner: Cessna Communications, Inc.
- Sister stations: WAYC, WBFD, WBVE

History
- First air date: August 5, 1974 (as WAYC)
- Former call signs: WAYC (1974–1993); WBFD (1993–2000); WHJB (2000–2009); WAYC (2009–2020)
- Call sign meaning: W RAX (branding)

Technical information
- Licensing authority: FCC
- Facility ID: 51881
- Class: D
- Power: 1,000 watts day 18 watts night
- Transmitter coordinates: 40°2′35.0″N 78°30′12.0″W
- Translator: 106.5 W293DF (Bedford)

Links
- Public license information: Public file; LMS
- Website: WRAX Online

WRAX (1600 kHz) is an adult standards-formatted broadcast AM radio station licensed to Bedford, Pennsylvania, serving Bedford and Bedford County, Pennsylvania. WRAX is owned and operated by Cessna Communications, Inc.

Known as WAYC from 1974 to 1993 and again from 2009 to 2020, the station adopted the call letters WRAX on September 15, 2020.

Studios are located on the second floor of the Pitt Theater building at 134 E Pitt Street in Bedford.

WRAX also broadcasts on FM translator W293DF at 106.5 MHz in Bedford, Pennsylvania.
