= Bedford, Pennsylvania =

Borough in Pennsylvania, US

- Borough
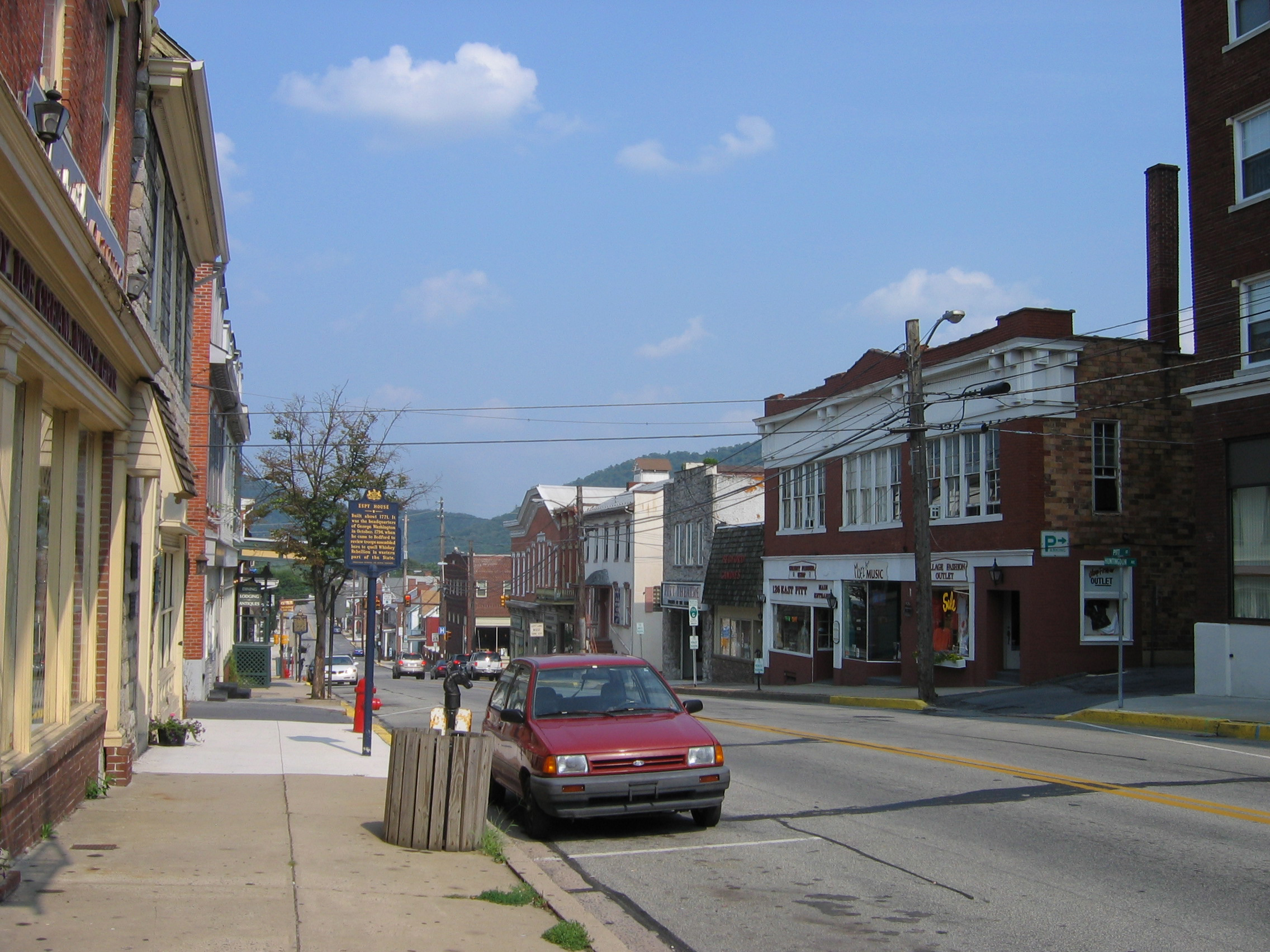
- East Pitt Street in Bedford

- Logo

- Location of Bedford in Bedford County, Pennsylvania (left) and of Bedford County in Pennsylvania (right)

- Location of Bedford in Pennsylvania Bedford (the United States) Bedford (North America)
- Coordinates: 40°00′59″N 78°30′15″W
- Country: United States
- State: Pennsylvania
- County: Bedford County
- Settled: 1751
- Laid out: 1766
- Incorporated: March 13, 1795

Government
  - Mayor: Michael Meehan

Area
  - Total: 1.11 sq mi (2.88 km^{2})
  - Land: 1.08 sq mi (2.81 km^{2})
  - Water: 0.027 sq mi (0.07 km^{2})
- Elevation: 1,100 ft (340 m)

Population (2020)
  - Total: 2,865
  - Density: 2,640.4/sq mi (1,019.45/km^{2})
- Time zone: UTC−5 (EST)
  - Summer (DST): UTC−4 (EDT)
- ZIP Code: 15522
- Area code: 814
- FIPS code: 42-04944
- Website: bedboro.com

Pennsylvania Historical Marker
- Official name: Bedford Village
- Designated: November 6, 1982

Bedford is a borough, spa town, and the county seat of Bedford County in the U.S. state of Pennsylvania. It is located 102 miles (164 km) west of Harrisburg, the state capital, and 107 miles (172 km) east of Pittsburgh. Bedford's population was 2,865 at the 2020 census.

== History ==
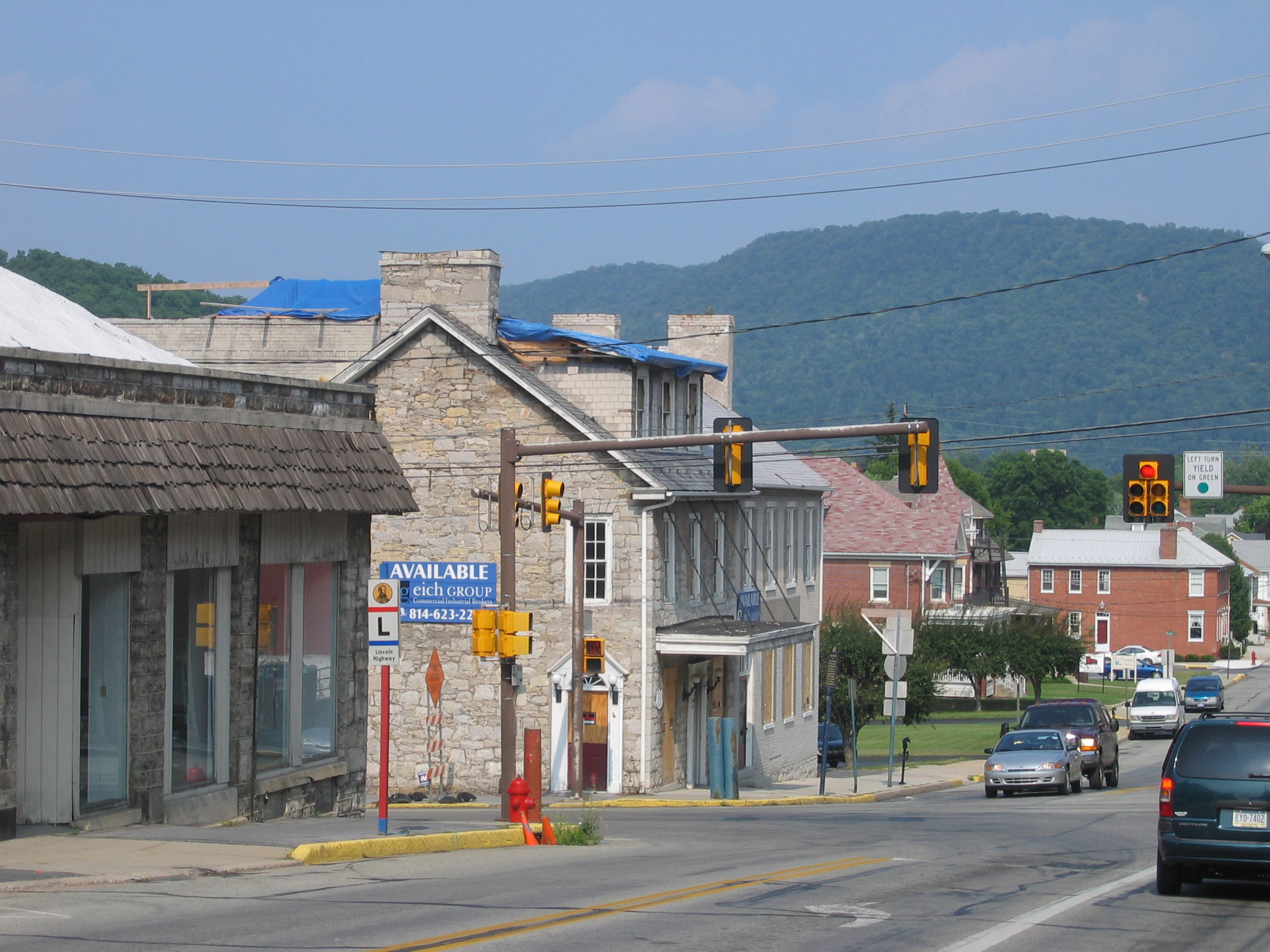
Fraser Tavern, a stone structure built after 1789, on the site of the original structure, which opened in 1758

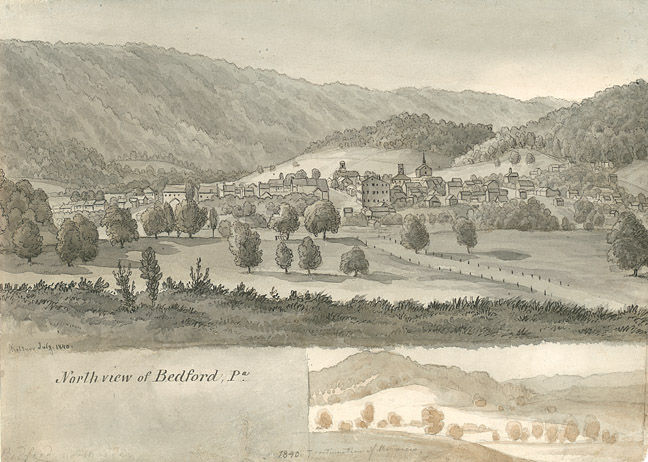
North View of Bedford, PA an 1840 portrait by Augustus Kollner

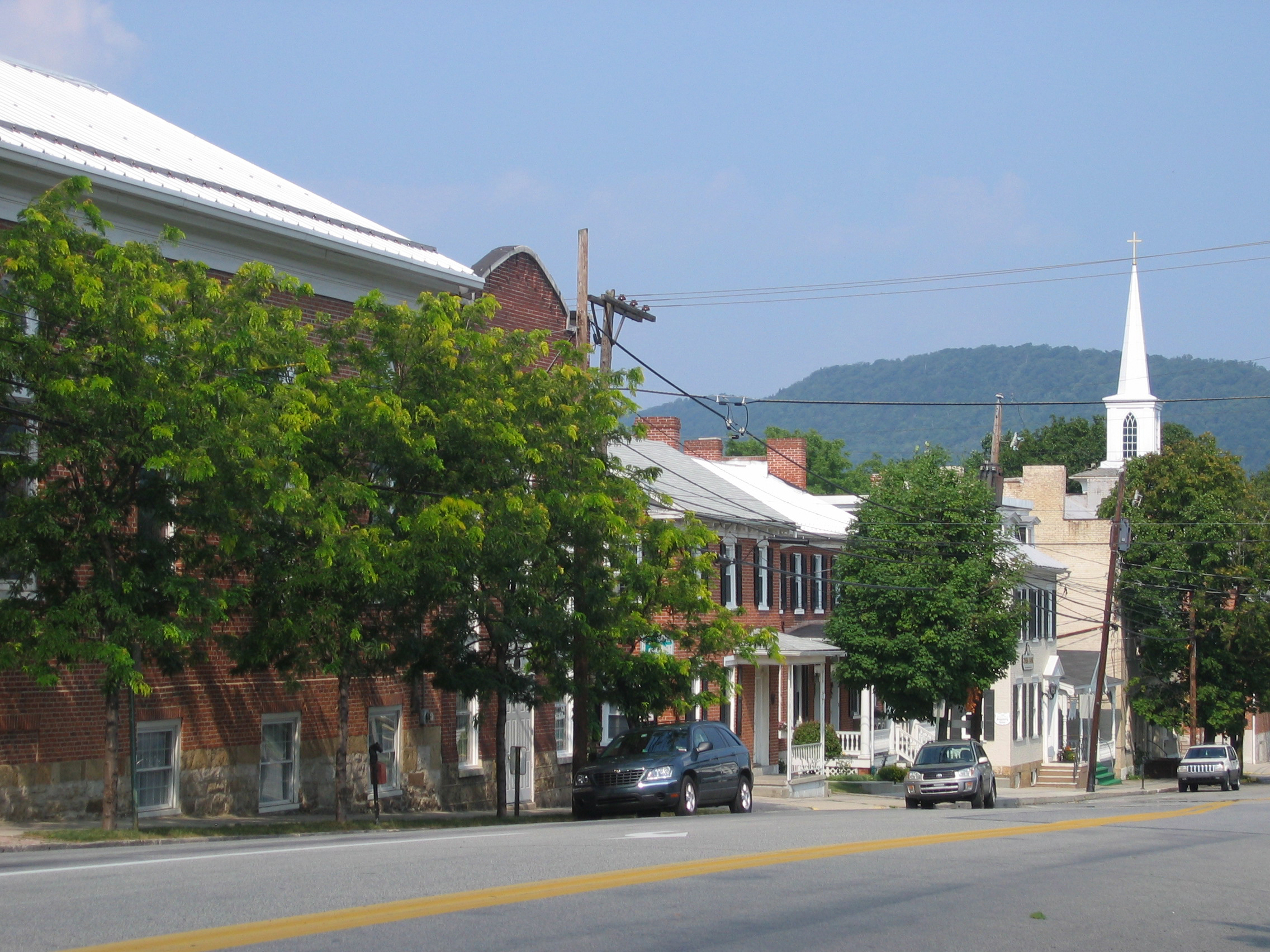
East Penn Street in Bedford

The area around Bedford was inhabited by European traders during the late 1740s and early 1750s. Permanent settlers, however, did not arrive until after Forbes Road was constructed in 1758 to support the Forbes Expedition's campaign against Fort Duquesne.

In 1758, the British Army under General John Forbes arrived at the location of John Ray's trading post to establish Fort Bedford, which served as a supply depot along the line of fortifications between Carlisle and the Forks of the Allegheny River. The fort was named after John Russell, the 4th Duke of Bedford. Some believe that the town later took its name from this fort. Fort Bedford was one of a series of British Army outposts leading west from Carlisle to the Forks of the Ohio, which had been claimed by the French, who had constructed Fort Duquesne to control fur trading in the Ohio Valley and along the Mississippi River. During the American Revolutionary War, Fort Bedford served as a refuge for settlers fleeing raids by Indigenous groups.

There is a popular myth that Fort Bedford was captured by American rebels, James Smith's "Black Boys," ten years before the American Revolution, making it the "first British fort to fall to American rebels." However, this claim is inaccurate. The British Army had already abandoned the fort in 1766, following the conclusion of Pontiac's Rebellion, whereas Smith's raid occurred in 1769. During the raid, a group of men attacked a pack train, seizing weapons and other goods intended for trade. These men were imprisoned, prompting Smith and his followers to attack the fort, which was guarded only by local settlers. The attackers freed the prisoners and seized additional firearms before departing. In his memoirs, Smith sought to portray himself as a figure akin to Robin Hood.

in 1766, John Lukens laid out the village of Bedford, which was formally incorporated on March 13, 1795. Due to administrative issues, the town had to be re-incorporated in 1816.

Fort Bedford eventually fell into ruin. In 1958, a structure modeled after one of the fort's blockhouses was built and now houses the Fort Bedford Museum. The original fort, which stood to the east of the museum, was not reconstructed.

In 1794, President George Washington mustered 13,000 Federal troops near Bedford to suppress the Whiskey Rebellion, which was sparked by a tax on whiskey. The troops are believed to have assembled near Jean Bonnet Tavern, four miles west of Bedford, while Washington himself used the Espy House in Bedford as his headquarters. The rebellion mainly involved farmers who argued that transporting whiskey was more economically viable than transporting grain. The uprising escalated, leading Washington to act decisively to ensure that federal laws were upheld. One historian later remarked, "It was at Bedford that the new federal government was finally to establish itself as sovereign in its own time and place."

During the 19th century, Bedford County became well known for its medicinal springs, leading to the development of three resorts: Bedford Springs, Chalybeate Springs, and White Sulphur Springs. The Bedford Springs Resort, established in 1806 by Dr. John Anderson, became particularly popular for its "healing waters." The resort offered several types of mineral springs and attracted visitors seeking cures for various ailments. President James Buchanan used Bedford Springs as his "summer White House," and it was there that he received the first trans-Atlantic cable message from Queen Victoria on August 17, 1858. In 1855, the resort also hosted the only U.S. Supreme Court hearing ever held outside of Washington, D.C.

The Chalybeate Springs Hotel was another prominent destination for affluent visitors during the 19th century. Notable guests of the Bedford Springs and Chalybeate Springs hotels included Presidents William Henry Harrison, James Polk, Zachary Taylor, Rutherford B. Hayes, and Benjamin Harrison, as well as Thaddeus Stevens and other notable figures.

U.S. Route 30, also known as the Lincoln Highway, passes through Bedford. Prior to the opening of the Pennsylvania Turnpike in 1940, U.S. Route 30 was the primary east-west route connecting Philadelphia to the west. In 1927, a coffee pot-shaped building, originally a diner, was constructed by David Koontz in Bedford. This unique landmark was relocated to the Bedford County Fairgrounds in 2003.

The Bedford Historic District was added to the National Register of Historic Places in 1983.

== Geography ==
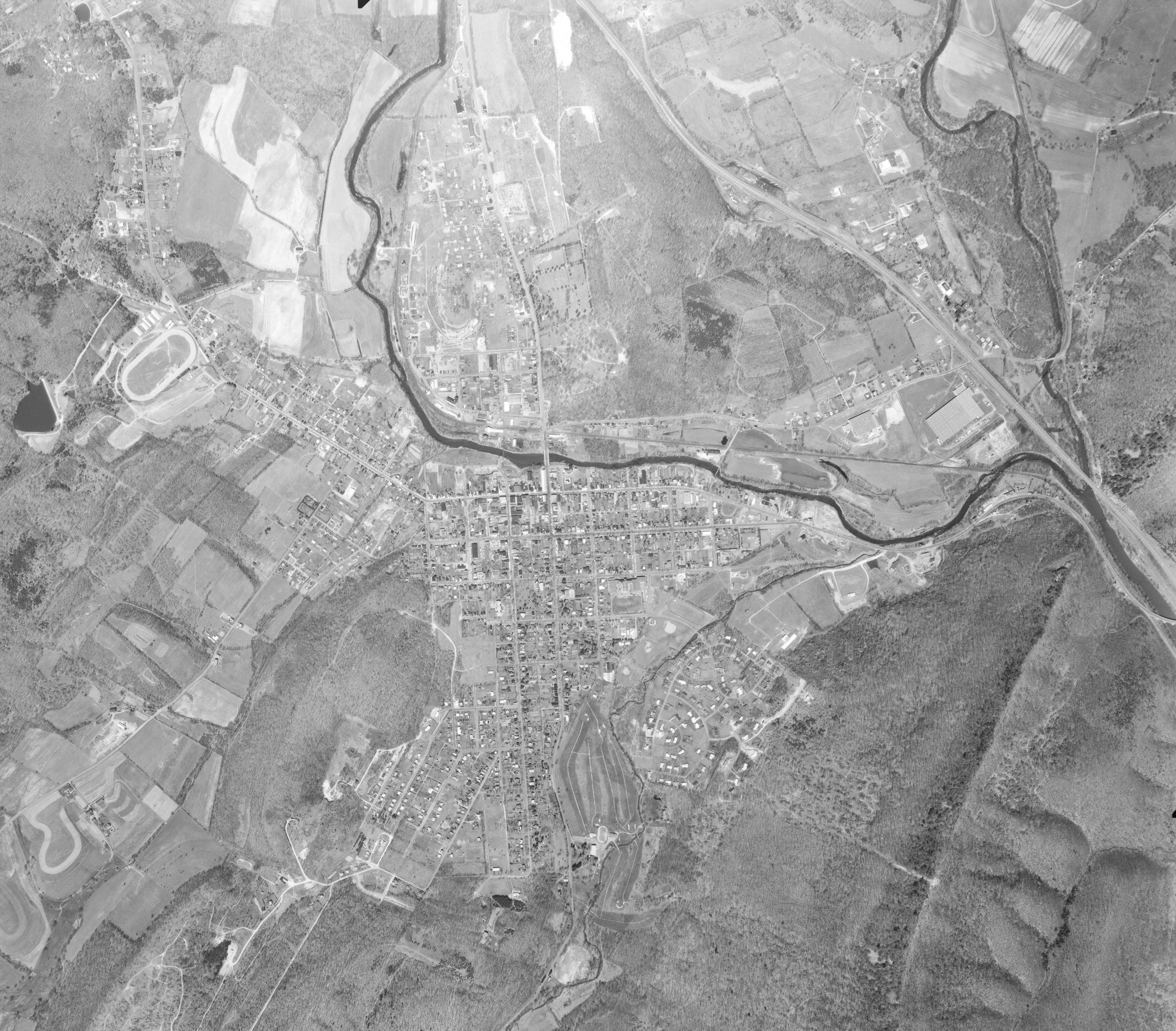
Bedford in 1969

Bedford is completely surrounded by Bedford Township.

The Raystown Branch of the Juniata River, a tributary of the Susquehanna River, flows west to east through the center of Bedford. The borough is accessible from Exit 146 of the Pennsylvania Turnpike at the midpoint between Harrisburg and Pittsburgh. U.S. Route 220 is a four-lane north-south highway that bypasses Bedford to the west and becomes Interstate 99 just north of town where it crosses the Pennsylvania Turnpike. US-220 Business passes through the center of Bedford as Richard Street.

According to the United States Census Bureau, the borough has a total area of 1.11 square miles (2.88 km^{2}), of which 0.03 square miles (0.07 km^{2}), or 2.51%, is water.

== Events ==
A Fall Foliage Festival is held in the beginning of October on the first two weekends of the month. The celebration stretches from Penn Street, down Juliana Street, to the park by the Fort Bedford Museum. The event includes many vendors, touring of the fort, the Children's Theater, pony rides, and an antique car show. There is also a crowning of a Fall Foliage Queen every year. This program lasts for about four months where nominees from all of the high schools in the area compete and participate in various events in hopes of winning the scholarship money. Each year there are three winners who each receive scholarship money to help with their future endeavors.

The Bedford County Fair takes place annually in July or August. Alongside a classic midway of rides, games, and food vendors are a multitude of 4-H-sponsored events (including animal shows and livestock auctions), automobile racing, demolition derbies, and a petting zoo. The automobile racing and demolition derbies take place at the Bedford Fairgrounds Speedway, adjacent to the remainder of the Fair.

== Demographics ==
Historical population
Census	Pop.	Note	%±
1800	257		—
1810	547		112.8%
1820	789		44.2%
1830	869		10.1%
1840	1,022		17.6%
1850	1,203		17.7%
1860	1,328		10.4%
1870	1,247		−6.1%
1880	2,011		61.3%
1890	2,242		11.5%
1900	2,167		−3.3%
1910	2,235		3.1%
1920	2,330		4.3%
1930	2,953		26.7%
1940	3,268		10.7%
1950	3,521		7.7%
1960	3,696		5.0%
1970	3,302		−10.7%
1980	3,326		0.7%
1990	3,137		−5.7%
2000	3,141		0.1%
2010	2,841		−9.6%
2020	2,865		0.8%
2021 (est.)	2,846	▼	−0.7%

Census data shows that as of 2021, there were 2,851 people, 1,265 households, and 1,492 housing units in Bedford. 50% of the population was female and 50% male. The racial makeup of the borough was 95% White, 2% African American, 1% Asian, 0% from other races, and 2% from two or more races. Hispanic or Latino of any race were 0% of the population. Only 0.1% of the population was foreign born, with 91% coming from Europe. 49% of the population was married and 51% single.

Of the 1,265 households, 62% were married couples living together, 8% had a female householder, 7% male householder, and 23% were non-families. The average household size was 2.3. Of the 1,492 housing units, 85% were occupied and 58% owner-occupied. 56% of the housing units were single unit and 44% multi-unit. The median value of owner-occupied housing units was $148,600 - about 75% of the state median.

The median age of borough residents was 49.5, about 20% higher than the state median. 18% of residents were under the age of 18, 54% from 18 to 64, and 29% were 65 years of age or older.

The median household income in the borough was $57,182, while per capita income was $30,401, both below the state medians. 6.6% of the population were below the poverty line, including 0% of those under age 18 and 12% of those age 65 or over. 91.9% had a high school degree or better, and 24.7% had a bachelor's degree or better.

== Economy ==
Bedford has both Walmart and REI distribution centers and JLG Inc. due to its close location to major highways and cities. There is also the Omni Bedford Springs Resort located just five miles (8.0 km) from downtown. Each year this resort brings in hundreds of thousands of guests who support the local economy. The Bedford County Airport is also a local economy booster. In the year 2022 they had a total output of over $8,000,000 and employed 55 people.

== Transportation ==
Bedford County Airport is a public use airport in Bedford County. It is owned by the Bedford County Airport Authority and is located four nautical miles (7.4 km) north of the central business district of the borough of Bedford.

== Media ==
=== Magazines ===
- Hometown Magazine

=== Newspapers ===
- Bedford Gazette

=== Television ===
Bedford receives television programming from the Johnstown-Altoona-State College, Pennsylvania media market.

=== Radio ===
Six radio stations are licensed to serve Bedford:

- WBFD - 1310 AM
- WRAX - 1600 AM
- W254DF - 98.7 FM (rebroadcasts WBFD)
- WAYC - 100.9 FM
- W293DF - 106.5 FM (rebroadcasts WRAX)
- WBVE - 107.5 FM

== Notable people ==
- William Mann Irvine, founding headmaster of Mercersburg Academy
- Lawrence Taliaferro, U.S. diplomat to the Dakota and Ojibwe nations from 1819 to 1839
- John Tod, U.S. Congressman for Pennsylvania from 1821 to 1824
- George Washington Williams, historian, clergyman, politician, lawyer, lecturer, and soldier
- Henry Woods, U.S. Congressman for Pennsylvania from 1799 to 1803

== See also ==
- Cannondale Bicycle Corporation had a factory in Bedford from 1983 until 2015.
