= List of New York City newspapers and magazines =

This is a list of New York City newspapers and magazines.

== Largest newspapers by circulation ==
Total circulation, as of March, 2013:

1. The Wall Street Journal (2,834,000 daily)
2. The New York Times (571,500 daily; 1,087,500 on Sunday)
3. New York Daily News (200,000 daily; 260,000 Sunday)
4. New York Post (230,634 daily)
5. Newsday (437,000 daily; 495,000 Sunday)

== Newspapers ==
In March 2023, The New Yorker reported there are 116 neighborhood newspapers in New York City. Several other newspapers serve the northern and western suburbs and Long Island.

- Akhon Samoy (Bengali weekly)
- AM New York Metro (free daily)
- Barron's (weekly)
- Bay Currents (bi-weekly)
- Bayside Times (weekly)
- The Bronx Beat
- The Bronx Chronicle, a century-old newspaper
- Bronx News
- Bronx Press-Review
- Bronx Times-Reporter
- Brooklyn Eagle (daily)
- Catholic Worker (monthly)
- The Chief (public service weekly)
- City & State (public service bi-weekly)
- Columbia Daily Spectator (weekly)
- Crain's New York Business (weekly)
- Der Blatt (Yiddish-language weekly)
- Der Yid (Yiddish-language weekly)
- El Diario La Prensa (Spanish-language daily)
- Empire State News (daily)
- The Epoch Times (daily)
- Filipino Reporter (weekly)
- Five Towns Jewish Times (weekly)
- The Fordham Observer (bi-weekly)
- Forṿerṭs (Yiddish; weekly, formerly daily)
- The Fordham Ram (weekly)
- Gay City News (now stylized as gcn) (weekly)
- Gotham Gazette (daily)
- Haitian Times (weekly)
- Hamodia (daily)
- The Indypendent (monthly)
- The Irish Echo (weekly)
- The Forward, formerly The Jewish Daily Forward (weekly)
- Jewish Post of New York (weekly)
- The Jewish Press (weekly)
- The Jewish Voice (weekly)
- The Jewish Week (weekly)
- Kanzhongguo (Chinese language weekly)
- The Korea Times (daily)
- Long Island Press (monthly)
- The Main Street WIRE (bi-weekly)
- Metro New York (free daily)
- Mott Haven Herald
- New York Amsterdam News (weekly)
- New York Daily News (daily)
- New York Law Journal (weekly)
- The New York Observer (weekly)
- New York Post (daily)
- The New York Times (daily)
- Newsday (daily)
- Norwood News (bi-weekly)
- Nowy Dziennik (Polish-language daily)
- Queens Chronicle (weekly)
- Queens Teens Voices (quarterly)
- Queens Tribune (weekly)
- Riverdale Press (weekly)
- Riverdale Review
- Show Business Weekly (weekly)
- Shukan NY Seikatsu (Japanese-language weekly)
- Sing Tao Daily (Chinese-language daily)
- Staten Island Advance (daily)
- Street News (every six weeks)
- Super Express USA (daily)
- The Tablet (weekly)
- The Tribeca Trib (monthly)
- Urdu Times (weekly)
- The Villager (weekly)
- The Wall Street Journal (daily)
- Washington Square News (daily)
- The Wave of Long Island (weekly)
- The Westsider (weekly)
- WestView News
- World Journal (Chinese-language daily)

== Defunct newspapers ==
- Al-Hoda (Arabic-language daily)
- The Bronx Home News
- The Brooklyn Baron
- Brooklyn Times-Union
- The City Sun (weekly)
- Colored American (weekly)
- Commercial Advertiser
- Daily Graphic
- East Village Other
- East Village Eye
- Freedom's Journal
- The Freeman
- Freie Arbeiter Stimme (Yiddish-language)
- Der Groyser Kundes (Yiddish-language weekly)
- Il Progresso Italo-Americano (Italian-language daily)
- Long Island Press (original daily)
- Ming Pao Daily News (free Chinese-language daily)
- National Guardian (weekly)
- New York Ace
- New York Age / New York Age Defender
- New York Avatar
- The New York Blade (weekly)
- New York City Tribune (daily)
- New York Clipper
- New York Courier and Enquirer
- New York Daily Mirror
- New York Daily News (19th century)
- New York Dispatch
- New York Enquirer (twice weekly)
- New York Evening Express
- New York Evening Mail
- New York Evening Telegram
- The New York Globe (two newspapers)
- New York Graphic
- New York Guardian (monthly)
- New York Herald (daily)
- New York Herald Tribune (daily)
- New York Independent
- New York Journal-American (daily)
- New-York Mirror
- New York Native (bi-weekly)
- New York Newsday
- New York Report
- New York Press (historical)
- The New York Sporting Whip
- New York Sports Express
- The New York Sun (daily)
- New-York Tribune (daily)
- New York World
- New York World Journal Tribune
- New York World-Telegram
- New Yorker Staatszeitung (German-language weekly)
- The Onion (free weekly)
- Other Scenes
- PM
- Rat Subterranean News
- Spirit of the Times
- Staten Island Register
- The Sun
- The Village Voice (free weekly)

== Magazines ==
Magazines with a primary focus on (parts or surroundings of) New York City

- Brooklyn Magazine
- The Brooklyn Rail
- City Limits
- Civilization
- GO NYC
- The L Magazine
- L'Idea
- Manhattan, inc. (defunct)
- New York
- Next Magazine
- The Real Deal
- Time Out NY

== See also ==
- Media in New York City
- List of newspapers in New York (state)
