= The Independent (East Hampton) =

Defunct US newspaper

- EVERYTHING EAST END
- Owner: Schneps Media
- Publisher: James J. Mackin, Jessica Mackin-Cipro
- Editor: Rick Murphy, Jessica Mackin-Cipro
- Managing editor: Bridget LeRoy
- News editor: Stephen J. Kotz, Rick Murphy
- Ceased publication: 2020 (print)
- Language: English, Spanish
- Headquarters: 74 Montauk Highway Suite 19 East Hampton, NY 11937
- City: East Hampton, NY
- Country: United States
- Circulation: 20,000
- OCLC number: 38838851
- Website: https://indyeastend.com/
- Free online archives: http://www.indyarchives.com/

The Independent is a local website, formerly a newspaper, published in East Hampton, New York by Schneps Media.

== History ==
The Independent was founded by James J. Mackin, President; Bridget LeRoy, Vice President; Lee Minetree, Treasurer; and Jodi Della Femina, Secretary. The first issue (vol. 1, no. 1) of the newspaper was released on September 1, 1993. The paper, originally named The East Hampton Independent, was renamed The Independent when they expanded to cover the entire East End. The paper was owned by East Hampton Media, and previously known as The East Hampton Independent News Co.

In 2005, the Independent acquired the Traveler Watchman. The Traveler Watchman is a newspaper from North Fork, Long Island, dating back to the 1800s.

Ultimately, Jerry Della Femia became a partner and was the majority owner of the paper until 2017. Jerry Della Femina is the father of daughter and co-founder of The Independent, Jodi Della Femina. On Wednesday April 19, 2017, the paper was sold to billionaire investor Ronald O. Perelman. Perelman, a resident of East Hampton himself, wanted to support and generously fund the paper's initial mission. In an article for Patch East Hampton he stated "As the paper's new owner, I am absolutely committed to supporting The Independent's mission with a continued focus on covering local news and events while enhancing and expanding the paper's focus and coverage of the vibrant local arts, culture, dining, social scene and real estate."

== Coverage ==
Every Wednesday, The Independent published coverage of local news and events on the entire East End. The print version of the paper is divided into several sections. In addition to the expected sections such as news & opinion, it included several unique sections such as Indy Style which discussed latest trends, store openings and designers and Indy Snaps which highlighted photography from all aspects of East End life.

The website was divided into five sections, news & opinion, arts, real estate, sports & health and the camps guide. The categories were then further divided into subsections encompassing the most important parts of each section. For example, the news & opinion header was separated into six sections, such as police and obituary. Within the sports section & health section of the paper, there was an entire subdivision focused on high school sports within the town. While The Independent covered all high school sports teams on the East End, they often covered sports within Pierson Middle-High School. One unique section of the newspaper that ran in the spring and summer months is the Camps Guide. The Camps Guide described children's summer camps throughout the New York Area such as Future Stars Camp and the Art Farm. The article contains a directory of camps with extensive summaries in addition to providing links and contact information for each camp.

In addition to the paper's online presence, The Independent has an online archive section of 767 copies online going back more than ten years.

== Merger and sale ==
On June 9, 2020, The Independent announced that it would be merging with competitor Dan's Papers to form a new media entity, Dan's Independent Media. While the merger was attributable partly due to falling advertising sales at the two publications as a result of COVID-19, discussions regarding the merger reportedly began in February 2020, prior to the major economic effects of the COVID-19 recession. After the merger, The Independent became online-only In September 2020, Dan's Independent Media was acquired by Schneps Media.

== Awards ==
At the 2018 New York Press Association Better Newspaper Contest Awards held in Albany, NY, The Independent won 21 awards. It won five first-place awards and nearly a dozen other awards; it additionally was awarded six honorable mentions.

The most prestigious award in the design category of the better newspaper contest is the Richard L. Stein Award for Overall Design Excellence. Although The Independent didn't receive this award, they received a significant honorable mention for the overall design and appearance of the entry provided. In addition to awards for individual contributors as well as presentation and design, Executive Editor Jessica Mackin-Cipro and Managing Editor Bridget LeRoy received awards for their writing.

- 1st Place, Coverage of Arts Editorial Award, Jessica Mackin-Cipro and Bridget LeRoy, (2018) - New York Press Association Better Newspaper Contest
- 1st Place, Best News Story “Deportations Of Those Convicted Of Crimes Ramp Up.” Award (2018) - New York Press Association Better Newspaper Contest
- 1st Place, Best Editorial Cartoon, Karen Fredericks "Is it Just Me?" (2018) - New York Press Association Better Newspaper Contest
- 1st Place, Photography, Karen Fredericks "Is it Just Me?" (2018) - New York Press Association Better Newspaper Contest
- 1st Place, Best Spot News Photo, Michael Heller "Is it Just Me?" (2018) - New York Press Association Better Newspaper Contest
- 1st Place, Best Sports Action Photo, Peggy Spellman Hoey"Is it Just Me?" (2018) - New York Press Association Better Newspaper Contest
- 2nd Place, Best Large Space Ad, Ty Wenzel (2018) - New York Press Association Better Newspaper Contest
- 2nd Place, Best Online Dynamic Ad, Ty Wenzel (2018) - New York Press Association Better Newspaper Contest
- 2nd Place, Obituaries, Jessica Mackin-Cipro and Bridget LeRoy (2018) - New York Press Association Better Newspaper Contest
- 2nd Place, Best Large Space Ad, Ty Wenzel (2018) - New York Press Association Better Newspaper Contest
- 2nd Place, Picture Store, Ed Gifford (2018) - New York Press Association Better Newspaper Contest
- 3rd Place, Sports Action Photos, Gordon M. Grant (2018) - New York Press Association Better Newspaper Contest
- 3rd Place, Spot News Coverage, Peggy Spellman Hoey (2018) - New York Press Association Better Newspaper Contest
- 3rd Place, Art Photo, Ed Gifford (2018) - New York Press Association Better Newspaper Contest
- 3rd Place, Best House Ad/Ad Campaign, Ty Wenzel (2018) - New York Press Association Better Newspaper Contest
- Honorable Mention, Best Public Service or Non-Profit Special Section (2018) - New York Press Association Better Newspaper Contest
- Honorable Mention, Picture Story, Justin Meinken (2018) - New York Press Association Better Newspaper Contest
- Honorable Mention, Feature Photos and Sports Feature Photos, Gordon M. Grant (2018) - New York Press Association Better Newspaper Contest
- Honorable Mention, Spot News Photos, Ed Gifford (2018) - New York Press Association Better Newspaper Contest

At the 2019 New York Press Association Better Newspaper Contest Awards held in Albany, NY, The Independent won 31 awards under the direction of Executive Editor Jessica Mackin-Cipro. The Independent won journalism awards like the Stuart C. Dorman Award for Editorial Excellence, Past Presidents Award for General Excellence, Richard L. Stein Overall Design Excellence, and Photographic Excellence.

- Newspaper Of The Year (2019) New York Press Association Better Newspaper Contest
- Stuart C. Dorman Award for Editorial Excellence (2019) New York Press Association Better Newspaper Contest
- Past Presidents Award for General Excellence (2019) New York Press Association Better Newspaper Contest
- Best Front Page (2019) New York Press Association Better Newspaper Contest
- Photographic Excellence (2019) New York Press Association Better Newspaper Contest
- Richard L. Stein Overall Design Excellence for In-Depth Reporting – Kim Velsey (2019) New York Press Association Better Newspaper Contest
- First Place – Coverage of Crime Police/Courts – T.E McMororow (2019) New York Press Association Better Newspaper Contest
- First Place – Editorial Cartoon – Karen Fredericks (2019) New York Press Association Better Newspaper Contest
- First Place – Picture Story – Gordon M. Grant (2019) New York Press Association Better Newspaper Contest
- First Place – Spot News Photo – Gordon M. Grant (2019) New York Press Association Better Newspaper Contest
- First Place – Special Section / Niche Publication (2019) New York Press Association Better Newspaper Contest
- Second Place - Thomas G. Butson Award for In-Depth Reporting – Kevin Gray (2019) New York Press Association Better Newspaper Contest
- Second Place – Editorial Cartoon – Karen Fredericks (2019) New York Press Association Better Newspaper Contest
- Second Place – Sports Feature Photos – Gordon M. Grant (2019) New York Press Association Better Newspaper Contest
- Second Place – Picture Story – Wil Weiss (2019) New York Press Association Better Newspaper Contest
- Second Place – Spot News Photo – T.E. McMorrow (2019) New York Press Association Better Newspaper Contest
- Second Place – Best House Ad – Ty Wenzel (2019)New York Press Association Better Newspaper Contest
- Third Place – Sports Action Photos – Gordon M. Grant (2019) New York Press Association Better Newspaper Contest
- Third Place – Sports Feature Photo – Desiree Keegan (2019) New York Press Association Better Newspaper Contest
- Third Place – Best News Website (2019) New York Press Association Better Newspaper Contest
- Third Place – Spot News Coverage – T.E. McMorrow (2019) New York Press Association Better Newspaper Contest
- Third Place – News Story – Bridget LeRoy (2019) New York Press Association Better Newspaper Contest
- Third Place – Best Use of Video – Jason Nower (2019)New York Press Association Better Newspaper Contest
- Third Place – Best Online Dynamic Ad- Ty Wenzel (2019) New York Press Association Better Newspaper Contest
- Third Place – Best Online News Project or Presentation – Ty Wenzel & Jessica Mackin (2019) New York Press Association Better Newspaper Contest
- Third Place – Sports Action Photo – Gordon M. Grant (2019) New York Press Association Better Newspaper Contest
- Third Place – Picture Story – Justin Meinken (2019) New York Press Association Better Newspaper Contest
- Third Place – Special Section / Niche Publication (2019) New York Press Association Better Newspaper Contest
- Honorable Mention – Sports Coverage – Desiree Keegan & Gordon M. Grant (2019) New York Press Association Better Newspaper Contest
- Honorable Mention – Art Photo – Irene Tully (2019) New York Press Association Better Newspaper Contest
- Honorable Mention – Best Special Section Cover – Ty Wenzel (2019) New York Press Association Better Newspaper Contest

== See also ==
- List of newspapers in the United States
- List of New York City newspapers and magazines
