= Matthew Spencer =

Matthew Spencer may refer to:

- Matthew Lyle Spencer (1881–1969), American minister, writer, and professor
- Matthew Spencer (footballer) (born 1985), Australian rules footballer
- Matthew Spencer (politician), American politician

== See also ==
- Matthew S. Petersen (Matthew Spencer Petersen, born 1970), member of the US Federal Election Commission
- Matthew Spence
