= AmNewYork =

Daily newspaper in New York City, US

amNewYork

- Type: Free daily newspaper
- Owner: Schneps Media
- Founder: Russel Pergament
- Publisher: Victoria Schneps
- Editor: Robert Pozarycki
- Founded: October 10, 2003
- Language: English
- Headquarters: New York City
- Sister newspapers: The Villager, Long Island Press, Gay City News, Metro Philadelphia
- Website: amny.com

amNewYork is a free newspaper that is published in New York City by Schneps Media. According to the company, the average Friday circulation in September 2013 was 335,900. When launched on October 10, 2003, it was the first free daily newspaper in New York City. By the 2020s, it was no longer published daily, instead being only published three times per week: Monday, Wednesday, and its weekend edition every Thursday.

amNewYork is primarily distributed in enclosed newspaper holders ("honor boxes") located on sidewalks at street corners with high pedestrian traffic, and racks in many major transportation hubs.

== History ==
Boston-based free newspaper publisher Russel Pergament moved into New York City's ultra-competitive newspaper market in the early 2000s, a move Time called "admirable in its audacity", by focusing on the 18-to-34 segment of the population that traditionally did not read newspapers and wanted content that was "fast, blather free and unbiased" according to Pergament. He launched amNewYork, published by the Tribune Company, on October 10, 2003. When it launched, amNewYork was the first free daily newspaper in New York City.

amNewYork grew quickly to a circulation of 290,000 by May 2004. The launch of amNew York was part of a broader effort across the United States to revive the moribund newspaper industry after a decade of eroding readership and declining business.

amNewYork, along with Newsday, was sold by the Tribune Company to Cablevision in July 2008. amNewYork was acquired by Schneps Media in October 2019 and subsequently merged with Metro New York to become amNewYork Metro in January 2020. On March 24, 2025, the "Metro" was dropped from the paper's name and it returned to its original title to align in with the paper's website, which remained at amny.com.

== See also ==
- Free daily newspaper
- List of New York City newspapers and magazines
