= John Nathan Cobb =

American author, naturalist, conservationist, and educator

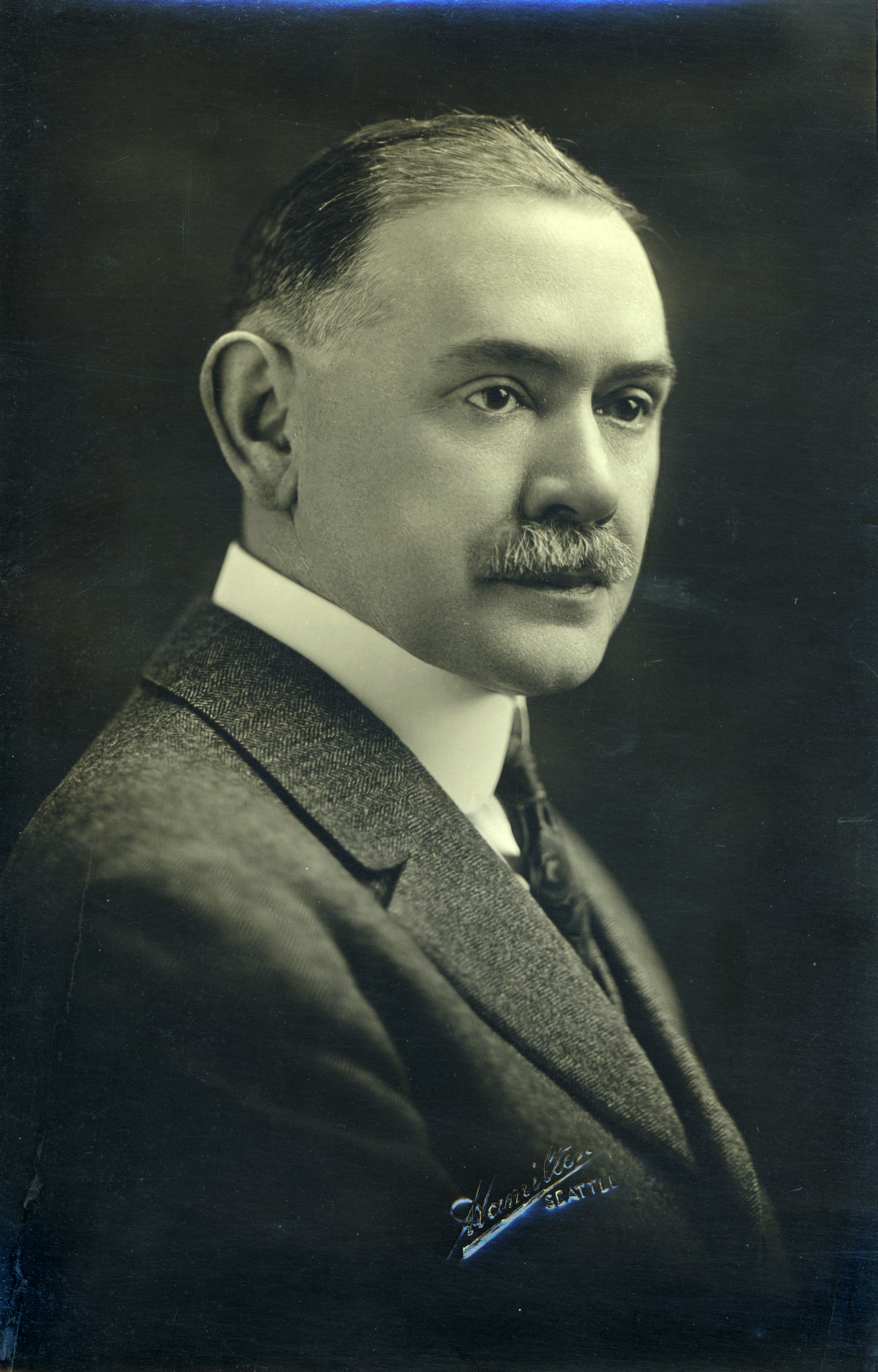
John Nathan Cobb, c. 1918

John Nathan Cobb (February 20, 1868 – January 13, 1930) was an American author, naturalist, conservationist, canneryman, and educator. He attained a high position in academia without the benefit of a college education. In a career that began as a printer's aide for a newspaper, he worked as a stenographer and clerk, a newspaper reporter, a field agent for the U.S. Fish Commission (USFC) and its successor the U.S. Bureau of Fisheries, as an editor for a commercial fishing trade magazine of the Pacific Northwest, and as a supervisor for companies in the commercial fishing industry. He took photographs during his extensive travels documenting scenes and people. In 1919, Cobb was appointed the founding director of the College of Fisheries at the University of Washington (UW), the first such college established in the United States.

== Early life and education ==
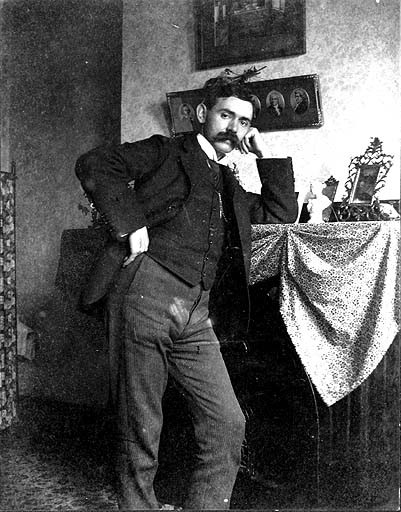

John Nathan Cobb was born in Oxford, New Jersey, on February 20, 1868, the son of Samuel Spencer Cobb (1842‒1921), a railroad engineer, and Louise Catherine Richard (1845?‒1918), a native of Belfort, France. He was one of at least twelve children in the family. He attended public schools and discontinued his education at an early age to go to work.

== Early career ==
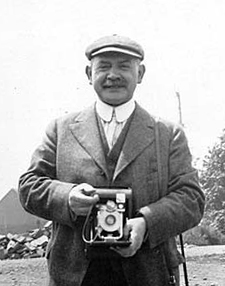
Cobb with camera

His family moved in the 1880s to Pennsylvania and records indicate that in 1884, at the age of 16 years, he was working for a Pennsylvania newspaper, the Carbondale Reader. He rose to become an editor of that periodical. For the next 15 years or so, Cobb worked, apparently as a stenographer and typist, in a variety of positions for a railroad company, a law firm, a supply and machinery enterprise, and a brick manufacturing company. In 1898, he married Harriet Collin Bidwell (1869‒1941), a cousin, with whom he had a daughter, Genevieve Catherine Cobb (1900‒1977) who graduated in zoology from the University of Washington and, after receiving a degree in librarianship at the UW, became a librarian at Princeton University and remained there until her retirement.

In 1895, Cobb successfully passed a civil service examination for the U.S. Government, qualifying him for a position as stenographer and typist at a salary of $720 per year. He accepted a position in Washington, D.C., on 1 July 1895 with the U.S. Fish Commission, where he was appointed clerk in the Division of Statistics. He was promoted to "Field Agent" on February 11, 1896, at a salary of $1,000 per annum and was responsible for collecting commercial fishery statistics. Thus, Cobb began a career in fisheries that was to last until his death 35 years later and one that led to his recognition as an "expert" in fisheries statistics.

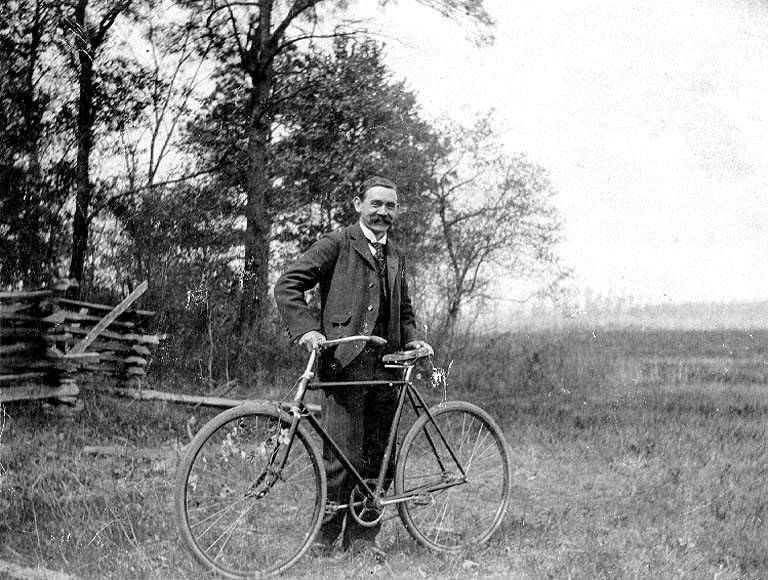
Cobb with bicycle in Hatteras, North Carolina 1898

Cobb's position with the Fish Commission demanded considerable travel, as he was required to proceed throughout the eastern seaboard to collect statistics on the commercial catch of fish and shell fish. For example, from 1896 to 1897 Cobb visited Jacksonville, Florida; Havre de Grace, Maryland; Key West, Florida; Wilkes-Barre, Pennsylvania; Key West again; and Cape Vincent, New York. After most of these trips he returned to the USFC headquarters in Washington, D.C. This pattern of frequent travel continued through 1900. Cobb's first publication for the Fish Commission, on the fisheries of Lake Ontario, was issued in 1898.

=== Alaska ===
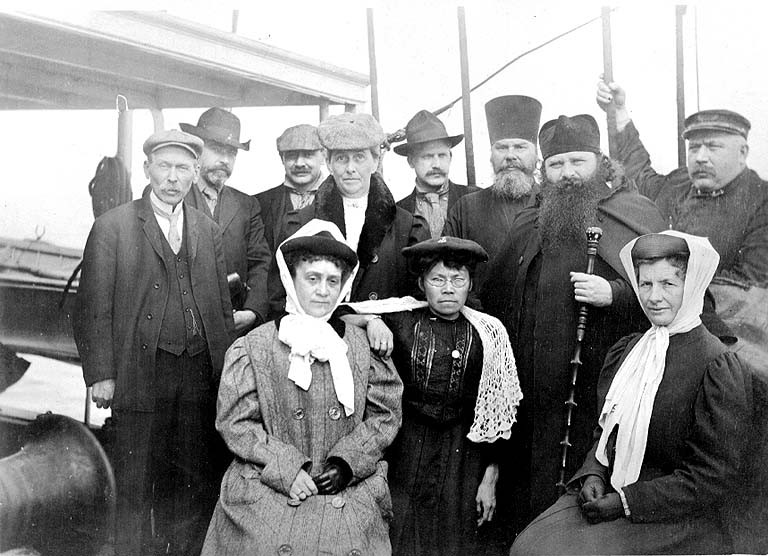
Cobb among passengers on the steamship Dora in the summer of 1907

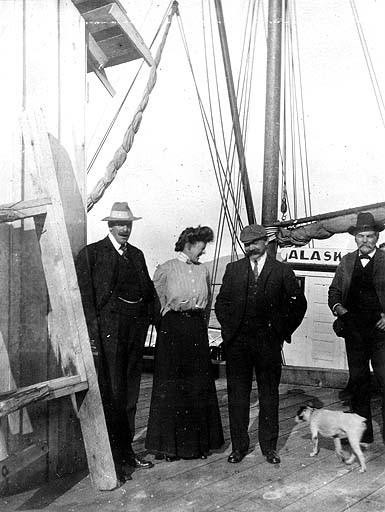
Cobb aboard a ship

In 1904, Cobb began to lobby the Bureau of Fisheries for a position in Alaska as a Field Agent in that territory. Cobb obtained the desired position in February 1905 and his appointment as "Assistant Agent" paid $200 per month. Still based in Washington, D.C., Cobb traveled to Alaska each summer to observe the commercial salmon fisheries and to collect catch statistics. He was apparently a conscientious worker and was known for his aggressive enforcement of fishery regulations.

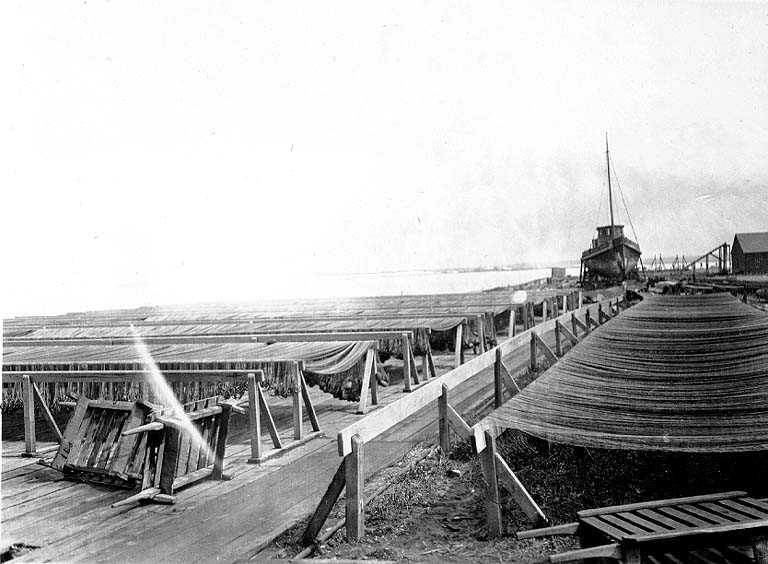
Cobb's photo of gillnets on racks in Nushagak, Alaska

Cobb wrote books and reports about fisheries. These included annual reports from 1905 to 1910 on the fisheries of Alaska and a book on Alaska salmon. He produced about 18 scientific publications and books during his tenure with the Fish Commission from 1895 to 1911.

=== Private sector ===
By early 1911, Cobb was eager for a transfer from Washington, D.C., to the west coast. In March of that year he wrote to George Mead Bowers (1863‒1925), Commissioner of the U.S. Bureau of Fisheries, asking to be transferred to Seattle. His request was denied, so Cobb turned to the private sector for employment. On March 5, 1912, Cobb wrote again to Commissioner Bowers, this time tendering his resignation. Cobb thus left the employ of the U.S. Bureau of Fisheries to pursue greener paths. He never worked for the Bureau again, but he was always interested in returning if an attractive position became available.

== Into the commercial world ==
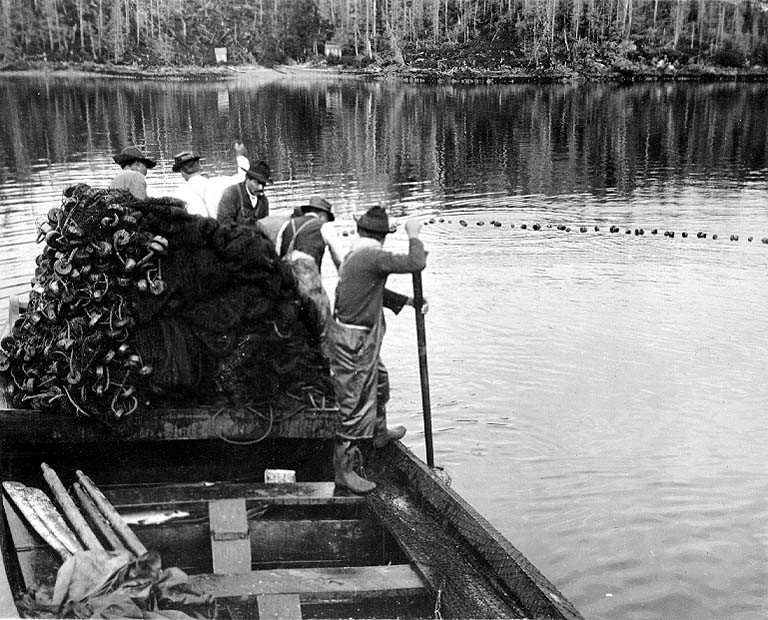
Cobb's photograph of gillnetters at work in Washington

In the spring of 1912, Cobb joined the Union Fish Company in San Francisco in a management position at a considerable increase in salary. The company fished for Pacific cod in Alaska, and Cobb traveled north on the company boats, the Union Jack in 1912 and the Sequoia in 1913, operating out of Sand Point and Unga, Alaska. Cobb's experience with the Union Fish Company was not satisfactory, as he apparently was not granted the freedom to manage as he had hoped, and he left the company on good terms in November 1913.

Cobb sought to improve his position, as he continually did, and in November 1913 the commercial fishing trade magazine Pacific Fisherman, based in Seattle, hired him, although at a significantly lower salary than that paid by the Union Fish Company. In his letter of acceptance, Cobb agreed to move to Seattle about 15 November 1913 and to accept a salary of $40 a week "for the present." His salary at the Union Fish Company was $200 a month. This monthly publication was the preeminent voice for the fishing industry of the west coast. He was hired as the editor of the journal and his particular experience in fisheries for the Bureau of Fisheries and the Union Fish Company brought rare skills to the magazine. The owner of the periodical, Leigh Miller Freeman (1875‒1955), became a power in the commercial fisheries industry and in fisheries conservation efforts. The Pacific Fisherman was a large format magazine devoted to all aspects of the fishing industry on the west coast. It paid particular attention to fishing developments in Alaska, and Cobb's experience in that territory was likely valuable to the magazine.

Cobb remained with the magazine for four years. During this period, he established himself as an informed observer of the commercial fishing and fisheries scenes. As editor, Cobb most likely had wide latitude over what was published in the journal. He wrote articles that appeared in the journal under his byline, such as "Utilizing waste products in the salmon industry" and "New methods in Pacific coast fisheries." Cobb also wrote for the scientific world, publishing in professional journals. An example of the latter includes "Pacific halibut fishery declining", published in the Transactions of the American Fisheries Society. During his years with the periodical he published one book Pacific Cod Fisheries, a revised edition of which was issued in 1927, and in 1917 he published a revised version of his book, Pacific Salmon Fisheries.

In Seattle in 1914, Cobb also helped found the Pacific Fisheries Society. Patterned after the American Fisheries Society, the new organization was directed toward the interests of fisheries workers, mainly scientific but also for members of the commercial industry of the U.S. west coast. Active membership in this new organization enabled Cobb to meet and to socialize with the leading men in both the scientific and commercial aspects of the Pacific coast fisheries. He longed, however, for a return to the Bureau of Fisheries. But a position with the latter agency was not forthcoming, so in 1917 he joined the Alaska Packers Association (APA) of San Francisco, California, at a salary nearly twice what he was receiving from the Pacific Fisherman. The Association was the largest and most influential commercial fishing enterprise in Alaska. At that time the APA operated the most fishing boats, employed the most workers, and canned the most salmon of any Alaska cannery. His move to the APA seemed part of his continuous desire to improve his status, economic and otherwise.

During the salmon fishing season in Alaska in the summers of 1917 and 1918, Cobb traveled north to visit the various APA concerns. His work involved inspecting the working and sanitary conditions in the canneries. Because of his previous work in Alaska with the Bureau of Fisheries, Cobb was familiar with most of the APA packing operations there. He was apparently satisfied with his work with the APA, but he again sought another position of advancement. Cobb's experience in the fisheries of Alaska, his former position at the Pacific Fisherman, and his involvement with the Pacific Fisheries Society placed him at the forefront of a burgeoning movement to establish a "school of fisheries" at the University of Washington. He was not an unwitting observer of this movement. Indeed, he kept his name always fresh to the University administration and the result was that Cobb resigned from the APA in January 1919 to accept the founding directorship of the College of Fisheries at the University of Washington. This new position would serve him well and allow him to use his diverse talents in the fisheries field.

== College of Fisheries ==
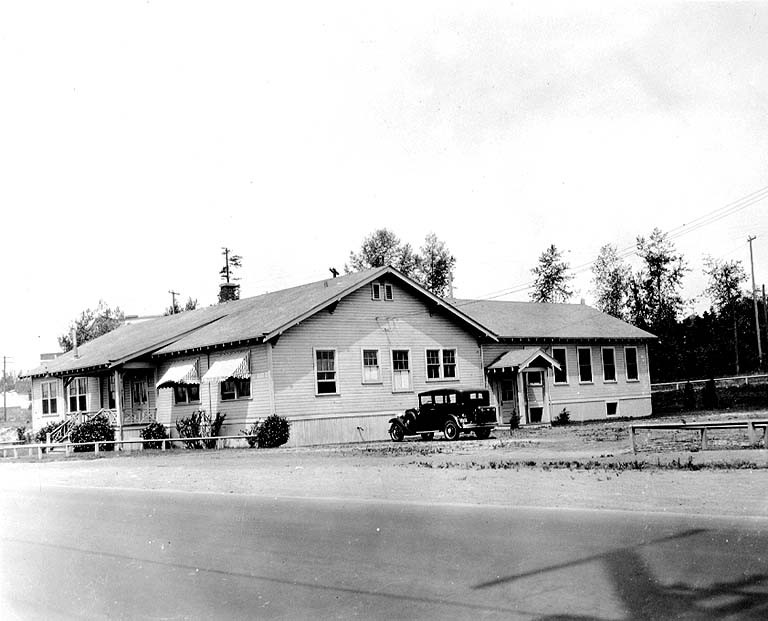
Cobb photo of the College of Fisheries building at UW, ca. 1921

The origin of the idea of a fisheries school at the University of Washington is unknown, but Miller Freeman, owner of Pacific Fisherman magazine and Cobb's one-time supervisor, likely played a vital role in the establishment of this new College. In his memoirs, Freeman wrote that he used the editorial pages of Pacific Fisherman to advocate the establishment of a school of fisheries at the University of Washington as early as 1914. Hugh McCormick Smith (1865‒1941), Commissioner, U.S. Bureau of Fisheries, was also an active supporter of the proposed school.

At the University of Washington, planning for a school of fisheries continued at a more rapid pace. In October 1918, UW President Henry Suzzallo (1875‒1933) wrote Cobb that through Miller Freeman he had heard that Cobb "might like to participate in the organization of such a school as a member of this faculty." Suzzallo was most concerned about the salary Cobb would require, noting that "Until this year our maximum salary has been $3,000." Cobb responded to Suzzallo on December 26, 1918, with his application for the position of director, and he noted that he had merely a common school education. He listed some 35 publications on fisheries topics in his application. Suzzallo answered Cobb on January 4, 1919, appointing him Professor of Fisheries, administrative head of the Department of Fisheries, and Director of the College of Fisheries, at a salary of $4,000 per year. Cobb's initial appointment was for a four-year period. Two weeks later, on 17 January 1919, Suzzallo recommended to the Board of Regents that a College of Fisheries be established at the University of Washington. The Board agreed and the establishment of the College was authorized. This event was duly reported in the Pacific Fisherman.

Cobb began the new College on a fast track. In an announcement for the College of Fisheries issued in early 1919, he wrote that so much interest was generated by the announcement of the establishment of the College that "Professor Cobb, the Director, is open [sic] it for the coming spring quarter, March 31st, instead of waiting until the beginning of the fall quarter as originally planned." The announcement indicated the College would offer a four-year course of instruction in Fish Culture and Fisheries Technology, and briefly described the potential job market for graduates. The announcement further stated that the College would, so far as possible, "assist students in securing employment during summer vacations" in various aspects of the fishing industry, hatcheries, and elsewhere.

The new college apparently began life housed in two temporary wooden buildings along the Lake Washington Ship Canal at the southern margin of the UW campus. The College soon relocated to other "temporary" housing located just north of the present UW Medical Center, where it remained until new quarters were built in the early 1950s. The initial faculty consisted of two new hires, one who taught courses in fish culture and another who was responsible for courses in fisheries technology. Trevor Charles Digby Kincaid (1872‒1970) of the Zoology Department taught ichthyology. Cobb taught at various times Introduction to Fisheries, Fisheries Methods, Fisheries Problems, and History of Fisheries.

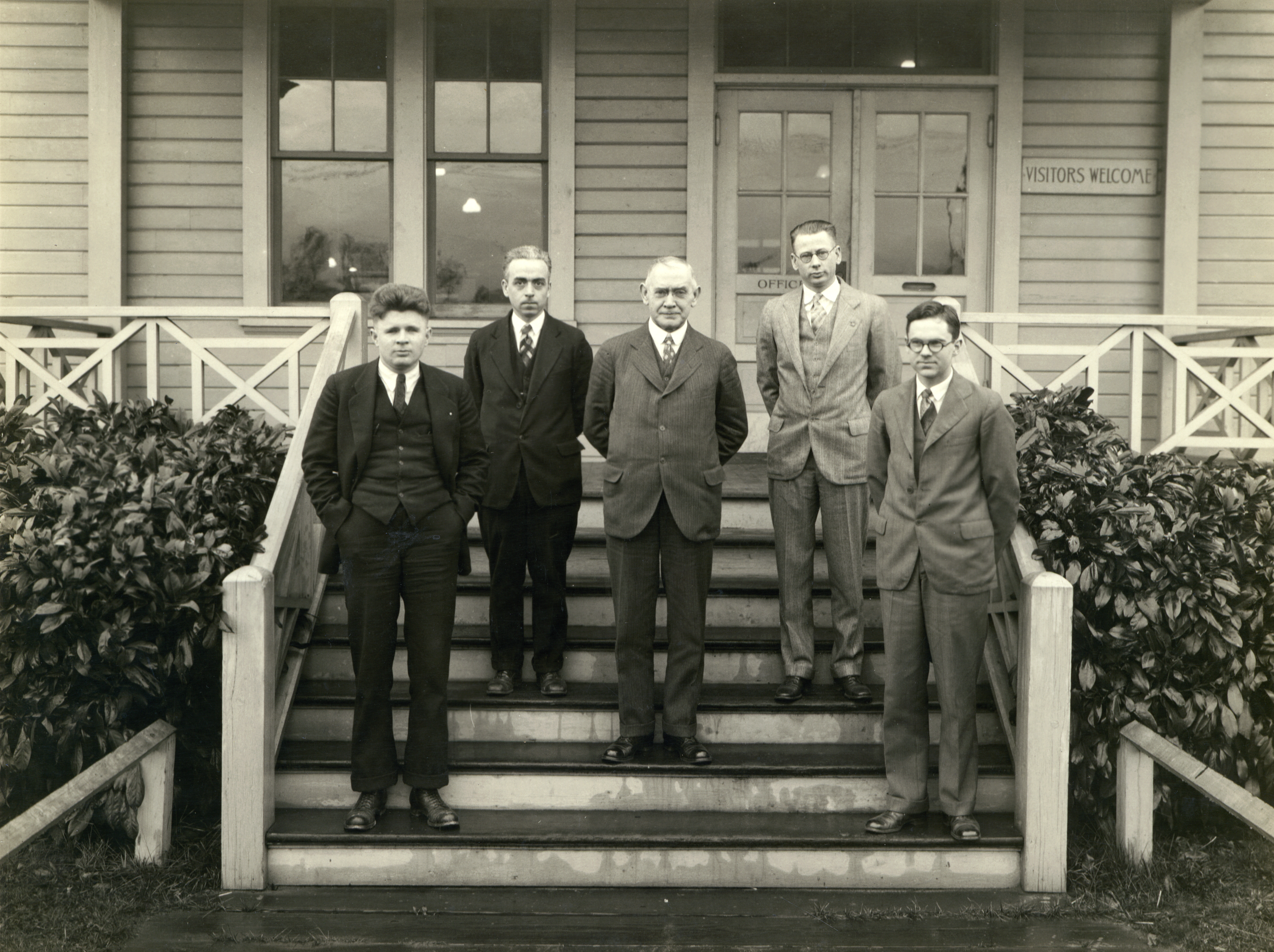
Faculty of the UW College of Fisheries, 1929. Left to right: Norman Jarvis, Donald Crawford, John Cobb, Clarence Parks, and Leonard Schultz. University of Washington Archives, UW 15484.

During Cobb's directorship, the faculty remained small and underwent considerable turnover, likely caused in part by the low salaries paid to instructors. The number of faculty listed in course catalogs from 1919 to 1930 ranged from two to five, including Cobb. Numerous "Associated Faculty" drawn from other UW departments or from industry or government agencies were listed in the Colleges entry in UW Course Catalogs.

The design of the curriculum largely followed that suggested earlier to the UW President by Professor Kincaid and previously outlined by Cobb. Two curricular tracks were initially established, fish culture and fisheries technology. The two lines of inquiry were quite similar for the first two years, differing mainly in that the requirements for the technology major included twice as many chemistry credits as did the fish culture major. The number of fisheries courses offered increased from 12 in the initial year of the College to 24 in the academic year 1928 to 1929.

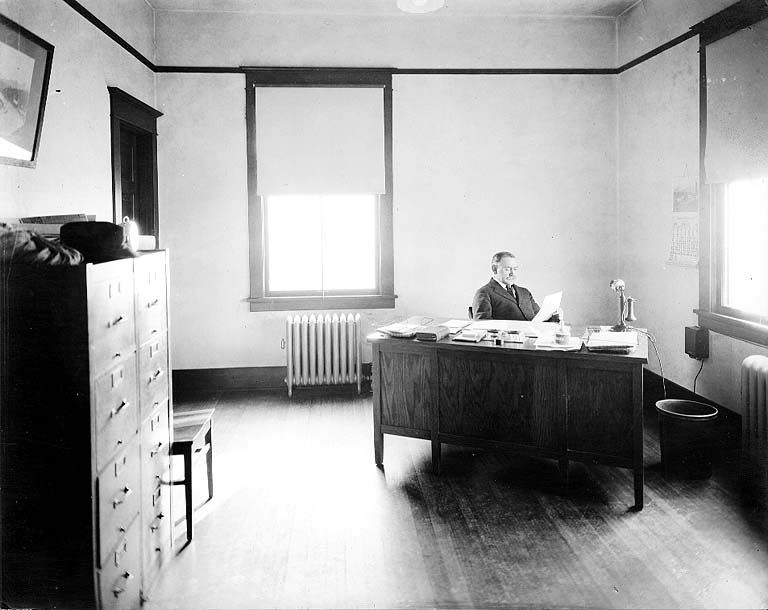
Cobb in his office at UW

Enrollment in the college was strong during the first decade of its existence, ranging from 30 to 117 students a year. The College initially offered Bachelor and Master of Science Degrees and, later, a Doctor of Philosophy Degree. The first graduating class in Fisheries was in 1922, with five B.S. degrees conferred as well as the first Ph.D. degree, awarded to Ray Clough, then on the College of Fisheries faculty. Identical numbers of degrees were apparently awarded each year in 1923, 1924, and 1925. The first M.S. degree was awarded in 1924 to Clarence Anderson, also on the faculty of the College. During Cobb's reign as Director and Dean, there were 31 B.S. degrees granted (from 1919 through the 1928 academic year) as well as one M.A., eight M.S., and two Ph.D. degrees. Thus, only about 42 students graduated during the first decade of the College.

Cobb vigorously promoted the college in a variety of ways. As a former newspaperman, he ensured that many articles were published in the local press. The College was also the subject of attention in the national and international print media. As Dean, he was the subject of a number of profiles in various newspapers and magazines. Cobb published several articles about the College and gave talks about fisheries to various clubs and organizations in Seattle as well as towns in outlying areas. Cobb was also active in the community, holding memberships in the Arctic Club of Seattle, the Puget Sound Academy of Science, and the Aquarium Society of Seattle for which he served as founding president. All of these social engagements served as a focal point for the College and for Cobb.

After spending some time in the university system, Cobb became aware that the college was not held in high esteem by many of his colleagues, likely because of its applied emphasis and lack of scholarly endeavor. Cobb initiated three actions likely designed to counter some of this criticism. In 1924 he began a research program on the passage of salmon over dams in which he was the sole investigator, he initiated in 1925 a journal of the College titled UW Publications in Fisheries, and he hired a trained ichthyologist to teach and conduct research.

Cobb and the department became involved in opposing the rise of new hydroelectric dams in the Northwest. Cobb himself began research on how to pass salmon over high dams, but was not qualified to do such research. He did not seek help from either biologists or engineers and his efforts became the focus of strong criticism. Cobb's experiments were a failure and he encountered substantial criticism from various quarters. It was obvious that he did not have a sufficient background in science or engineering to conduct this work.

In the late 1920s, Cobb planned to create a Department of Ichthyology that would be "separate" from the applied courses in the College. Presumably this new department would engage in "scholarly research." In 1927, he began to search for a qualified ichthyologist to teach, conduct research, and to begin a systematic fish collection in the College. After a nation-wide search, Cobb selected Leonard Peter Schultz (1901‒1986) whom Cobb had met in 1926. Schultz had received an M.S. degree at the University of Michigan and was teaching zoology at the Michigan State Normal College at Ypsilanti. Schultz was apparently planning to pursue a Ph.D. degree in ichthyology at the University of Michigan. Schultz moved to Seattle in the fall of 1928 and immediately began to teach and to assemble a research collection of fishes.

Cobb was well known for having a "strong personality." He apparently antagonized the faculty, but the hostility of his colleagues did not surface until Cobb's incapacitation due to ill health in 1929. In a ten-page memorandum titled "Confidential: Conditions at the College of Fisheries" and signed "Staff," the authors laid out a series of complaints against the Dean. The authors wrote that the College had lost prestige, mainly since 1925, due to the Dean's activities. They criticized Cobb's work on passage of salmon over dams complaining that he was unqualified to do so because he lacked training as a scientist and was neither a biologist nor an engineer. Complaints about his "science" also reached the news media.

== Later life and death ==
John Nathan Cobb suffered from heart disease and endured a heart attack in the summer of 1929. He was ill for many months and spent his final days in the warmer climate of La Jolla, California, where he died on January 13, 1930, at the age of 61. His death was prominently noted in local newspapers and in numerous fisheries publications.

Shortly after Cobb's death, Washington State Governor Roland Hill Hartley (1864‒1952) appointed a new President of the University, Matthew Lyle Spencer (1881‒1969). Spencer sought scholarship and high academic standards at the UW and he did not think highly of the College of Fisheries. Apparently, courses in canning and fishing methods did not meet the new President's criteria of scholarship. As a result, the College was dissolved in April, 1930, and all faculty of the College were dismissed, except for Leonard Schultz, who was apparently considered a bona-fide academic and was assigned to a position in the new College of Science.

Uproar occurred among the students in the College who now faced a situation wherein they now had no major field. They sent a telegram to Governor Hartley protesting President Spencer's decision, stating in part that his judgment was "Protested by unanimous action of fisheries students." Upon his inquiry of the UW, Governor Hartley was told that the Board of Regents had created a new College of Science and had elected to consolidate the College of Fisheries as a Department in the new College.

A new director was appointed for the department in the person of William Francis Thompson (1888‒1965), who was to become the dominant figure in the UW Department (later, School) of Fisheries for over 16 years and the preeminent fishery scientist of the Pacific Northwest for nearly 40 years. Thompson had offices in the College of Fisheries where, since 1925, he was Director of the International Fisheries Commission (now International Pacific Halibut Commission) charged with the management of, and research on, the Pacific halibut, Hippoglossus stenolepis, fishery. A Ph.D. from Stanford University, Thompson was appointed Research Professor and Director of the new department on a part-time basis, as he remained Director of the International Fisheries Commission. He remained Director of the School until 1947 when he resigned to establish and head the UW's new Fisheries Research Institute.

Thompson instituted an entirely new approach to fisheries education at the UW, concentrating on the emerging field of fisheries science. He revised the curriculum to emphasize basic science and not the technology of the commercial fishing industry. To the present day, the School of Fisheries (now School of Aquatic and Fishery Sciences) has continued the emphasis on fisheries science and on graduate study.

== Legacy ==
Through self-education, work, and ambition, John Cobb rose from unpretentious beginnings to become dean in a major university. His career was testimony not only to the democratic ideals of the United States, but it was evidence of his competence and an affirmation of the high level of respect in which he was held by his peers. Cobb excelled in knowledge of the commercial fisheries industry.

Cobb's tenure as Director (later, Dean) of the College of Fisheries from 1919 to 1930 must be considered successful, based upon the number of students enrolled in the College as well as in the records of attainment of its graduates. His approach to the educational focus of the College reflected his experience and mindset, focusing on the practical applied aspects of the commercial fishing industry. Initially, this approach was also that favored by the University administration. By the time of his death in 1930, however, it became apparent that his educational philosophy was out of date and was not accepted by the new University administration because of the College's failure to emphasize scholarly achievement. This was demonstrated by the rapid termination of the College by the UW administration upon Cobb's passing in 1930.

Cobb was a well-known "professional" naturalist of his day and his reputation was based on his keen knowledge of the commercial fisheries industry which was reflected in his many publications. He was a skilled compiler of fisheries catch statistics, and he produced well-received books on the fisheries of both Pacific salmon, Oncorhynchus spp., and Pacific cod, Gadus macrocephalus. Cobb's position as Dean of the College of Fisheries at the University of Washington emphasized his role as a leading national expert on fisheries.

== Namesake ==
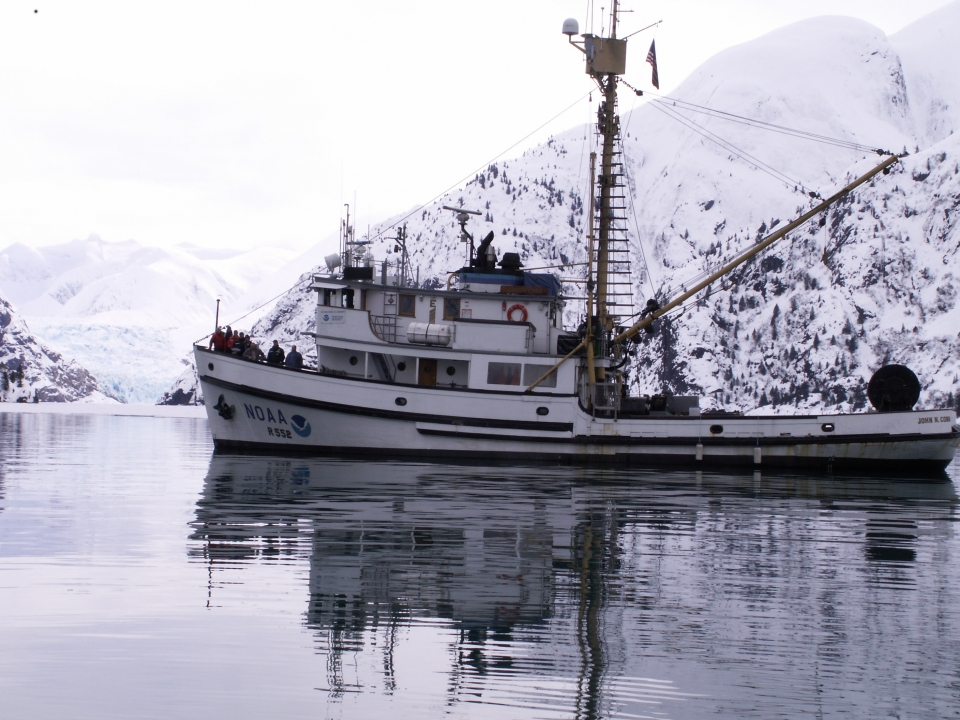
The National Oceanic and Atmospheric Administration research ship NOAAS John N. Cobb (R 552).

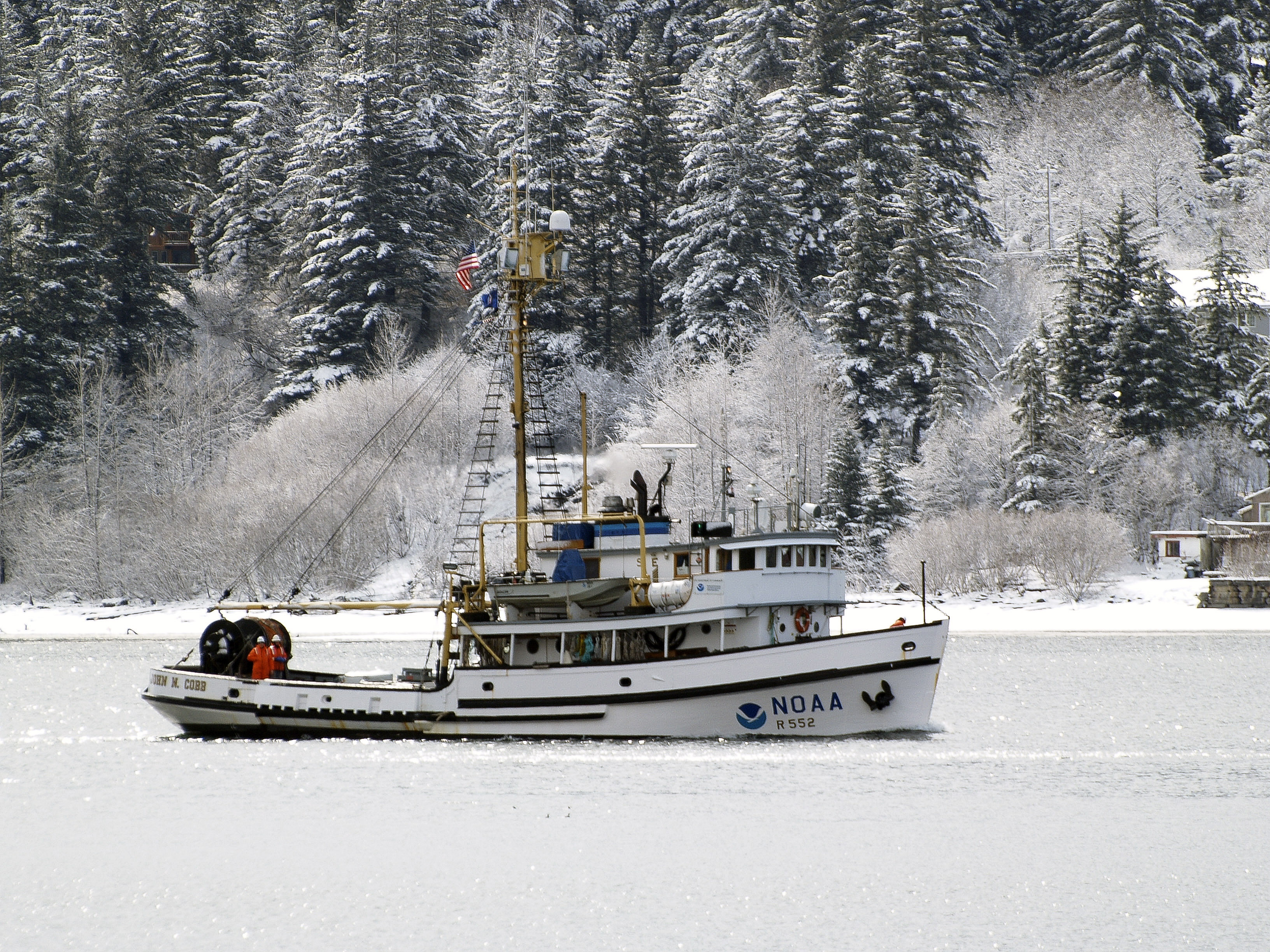
NOAAS John N. Cobb (R 552) at Juneau, Alaska, on April 17, 2008.

The research ship NOAAS John N. Cobb (R 552) was named for Cobb. She served in the fleet of the U.S. Bureau of Commercial Fisheries from 1950 to 1970 and in the U.S. National Oceanic and Atmospheric Administration (NOAA) fleet from 1970 until 2008. She was the longest-serving ship of the NOAA fleet and its predecessors at the time she left service, and has been listed on the U.S. National Register of Historic Places since 2009.
