= Schneps Media =

News source, publisher

- Industry: Publishing
- Founded: 1985; 41 years ago
- Founder: Victoria Schneps-Yunis
- Headquarters: New York City
- Area served: United States
- Key people: Josh Schneps (CEO)
- Products: Newspapers; mass media
- Website: www.schnepsmedia.com

Schneps Media is a New York City-based media company that owns and operates over 50 publications including newspapers and magazines in both print and online formats as well as seminars and events. It is led by Victoria Schneps-Yunis and her son, CEO Joshua Schneps.

== History ==
In 1985, Victoria Schneps-Yunis founded the company with the publication of The Queens Courier in her Bayside home.

In 2017, Schneps purchased the Long Island Press from Morey Publishing.

In October 2019, Schneps acquired amNewYork from Newsday Media Group. Three months later, Schneps acquired Metro New York, merging the two papers under the current amNewYork Metro title; Metro Philadelphia was also acquired.

In May 2024, the company acquired Anton Media Group.

In July 2024, the company acquired Blank Slate Media.

In July 2025, Schneps sold Metro Philadelphia, Metro.us, and Philly Sports Network to O’Rourke Media Group.

In June 2026, editorial employees at Schneps Media announced plans to unionize with the NewsGuild of New York citing concerns over compensation, workplace conditions, and editorial independence.

In October 2026, the company acquired the Queens Chronicle.

== Controversies ==
=== Bias in favor of Eric Adams ===
Schneps Media’s leadership has faced criticism over its relationships with political figures, particularly former Mayor of New York City Eric Adams, who publicly credited Victoria Schneps with supporting his mayoral campaign. Critics also alleged that the company encouraged favorable coverage of political figures with personal ties to Schneps. The company was criticized in 2019 for its involvement in One Brooklyn, a free mailing by Adams, then-Brooklyn borough president, described by Gothamist as "full of glowing stories about the borough president" and described by the New York Daily News as a "pseudo-newspaper." Former Schneps reporters said that "the Schneps owners forced them to write sponsored content, while shielding advertisers and local officials from critical coverage." HellGate included Victoria Schneps in its "Table of Success" exposé of powerful figures with close ties to Adams. The entry about her and her son, CEO Josh Schneps, quotes Adams saying at an October 2023 event: “When I write my book, there’s going to be a chapter on what she did to get me to become the mayor.”

== Publications ==
Publications include:

- amNewYork Metro
- Bronx Times-Reporter
- The Brooklyn Paper
- Dan's Papers
- Gay City News
- The Independent (East Hampton)
- TimesLedger Newspapers
- The Villager
- Long Island Press (Long Island)
