= New York Metro =

New York Metro can refer to:

- New York metropolitan area
- Metro New York, a free daily newspaper in New York
- New York City Subway
