= ICJP =

ICJP may refer to:

== Organisations ==
- International Centre of Justice for Palestinians
- International Council of Jewish Parliamentarians
