= The Reporter (1935–1937) =

Black-owned New York City newspaper

- Type: Weekly newspaper
- Publisher: Newspaper Guild of New York
- Founded: October 11, 1935
- Ceased publication: April 10, 1937
- Headquarters: 205 West 135th Street, New York, NY 10030
- City: New York City
- Country: United States
- OCLC number: 19059659

The Reporter was a weekly Black-owned newspaper serving the New York City area from 1935 to 1937. It was published by the Newspaper Guild of New York on behalf of the editorial members of the New York Amsterdam News during a 1935 strike, the first such strike within a Black-owned newspaper.

== History ==
In 1935 fifteen editorial workers within the Amsterdam News sought to form a local unit of the then recently founded American Newspaper Guild. In response, the owners of the Amsterdam News locked out the majority of their editorial workers, leading to picketing and calls for a boycott against the newspaper. This is reported to be the first such case of successful labor action by Black workers against Black employers.

In response to these calls for a boycott, The Reporter was published a few days later by the former editorial workers and by the Newspaper Guild. Issues of the newspaper were typically two pages long, with one page consisting of news and updates about the strike and the other page consisting of "DON'T BUY AMSTERDAM NEWS" in large font filling the page. This newspaper was published out of the Dumas Hotel on West 135th Street, in an office set up by the Newspaper Guild for the striking workers.

The final publication made during the strike was on December 12, 1935. The strike ended on December 24, 1935, after eleven weeks, with the striking workers reinstated and receiving a 10% pay raise.The Reporter stopped publishing due to the end of the strike, as the people who wrote and edited for it returned to their jobs at the Amsterdam News.

The Reporter had a second volume published in 1937, to deny the existence of segregationist policies by the Newspaper Guild of New York and deny allegations that their union had tried to seize control of the Amsterdam News. No volumes of The Reporter were published after 1937.

== See also ==
- New York Amsterdam News
- NewsGuild-CWA
- Labor history of the United States
- List of New York City newspapers and magazines
- Media in New York City
