= Dan's Papers =

Weekly newspaper in the Hamptons, Long Island

Dan's Papers is a free weekly lifestyle publication in the Hamptons, Long Island, New York, United States, founded by Dan Rattiner. The first of the papers that would later collectively come to be known as Dan's Papers was the Montauk Pioneer, which debuted July 1, 1960.

Dan's Papers has gained notoriety for perpetrating various hoaxes, such as stories of a Hamptons Subway beneath the East End of Long Island. The first of these, in 1963, happened by mistake when founder Dan Rattiner incorrectly printed the timetable of trains in the paper. He received a call from the local stationmaster, who told him a crowd of people were there waiting for a train that doesn't exist. The error made Rattiner realize he could do things to get the whole town talking about his paper. It began publishing stories about the fictional Old Man McGumbus in 2011.

The magazine regularly included Rattiner's pen-and-ink cartoons and sketches. His art depicted the East End of Long Island, both its landscape and people ranging from "farmers, movie stars, fishermen and Wall Streeters." 30 years after starting Dan's Paper, Rattiner had his first exhibition when he had two solo shows at the Ferregut Tower Gallery in Southampton, NY in 2007. Among the titles that emerged in the same market was Hamptons, founded in 1978, which competed directly with Dan's Papers for East End readership before evolving into a luxury lifestyle publication.

Rattiner sold Dan's Paper in 2007 to Ohio-based Brown Publishing Company. Rattiner sold the magazine for $19.6 million, significantly more than the $1.75 million Brown sold it for three years later in 2010. Manhattan Media purchased the magazine from Brown, which sold Dan's Paper as part of its bankruptcy. On June 9, 2020, Manhattan Media also purchased the East Hampton-based outlet The Independent and merge it with Dan's Paper to create Dan's Independent Media. Just a few months later, in September 2020, Schneps Media purchased Dan's Independent Media from Manhattan Media.

Since 2020, Timothy Bolger has served as its editor-in-chief. Its managing editors are Oliver Peterson and Michael Malaszczyk.
