= Old Man McGumbus =

2011 hoax

Old Man McGumbus is a hoax based upon the alleged exploits of a fictional American World War II veteran living in Shelter Island, New York. Fake police blotter reports about incidents involving "Old Man McGumbus" were published in the weekly publication Dan's Papers.

== History ==
The first story about Old Man McGumbus, a 104-year old, libertarian veteran of World War II, appeared in the police blotter section of Dan's Papers in 2011. The story claimed that he had been found unconscious by the side of the road with a sex doll, a bouquet of roses, and three bottles of bourbon whiskey. Stories related to Old Man McGumbus typically attribute outlandish feats to him, such as taming a Bengal tiger with his belt. Other stories involve his participation in Shelter Island society, such as attending polo matches. The hoax went viral on the social media platform reddit in 2012. In 2015, Dan's Papers claimed that he had built a bunker on the beach of Shelter Island and sealed himself inside with a supply of dried meat.
