= Gary Ackerman =

American politician (born 1942)

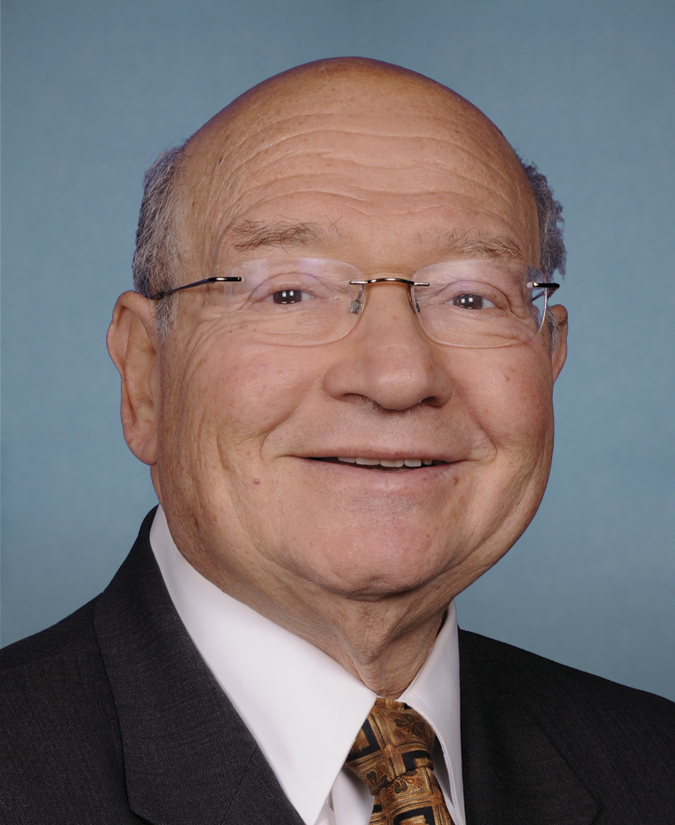

Member of the U.S. House of Representatives from New York
- In office March 1, 1983 – January 3, 2013
- Preceded by: Benjamin S. Rosenthal
- Succeeded by: Grace Meng (redistricted)
- Constituency: 7th district (1983–1993); 5th district (1993–2013)

Member of the New York State Senate from the 12th district
- In office January 1, 1979 – March 1, 1983
- Preceded by: Jack E. Bronston
- Succeeded by: Leonard P. Stavisky

Personal details
- Born: Gary Leonard Ackerman; November 19, 1942 (age 84) New York City, New York, U.S.
- Party: Democratic
- Education: Queens College (BA)
- Ackerman's voice Ackerman on a House resolution in remembrance of the September 11 attacks. Recorded September 11, 2008

Gary Leonard Ackerman (born November 19, 1942) is an American retired politician and former U.S. representative from New York, serving from 1983 to 2013. He is a member of the Democratic Party. On March 15, 2012, Ackerman announced that he would retire at the end of the 112th Congress on January 3, 2013, after fifteen terms, and would not seek re-election in November 2012.

== Early life, education, and early career ==
Ackerman was born in Brooklyn, the son of Eva (née Barnett) and Max Ackerman. His grandparents were Jewish immigrants from Russia and Poland. He was raised in Flushing, Queens. He attended local public schools, Brooklyn Technical High School and graduated from Queens College in 1965. After college, Ackerman became a New York City School teacher where he taught social studies, mathematics, and journalism to junior high school students in Queens.

Following the birth of his first child in 1969, Ackerman petitioned the New York City Board of Education for an unpaid leave of absence to spend time with his newborn daughter but his request was denied, under then existing policy which reserved unpaid "maternity-child care" leave to women only. In what was to be a forerunner of the Family and Medical Leave Act of 1993, then teacher Ackerman successfully sued the board in a landmark case which established the right of either parent to receive unpaid leave for child care. A quarter of a century later, now a congressman, Ackerman in the House–Senate Conference Committee, signed the report of the Family and Medical Leave Act which became the law of the land.

Ackerman's second career move occurred in 1970, when he left teaching to start a weekly community newspaper in Queens called The Flushing Tribune which soon became the Queens Tribune. Ackerman served as its editor and publisher.

== New York Senate ==
Ackerman was a member of the New York State Senate from 1979 to 1983, sitting in the 183rd, 184th and 185th New York State Legislatures.

== U.S. House of Representatives ==
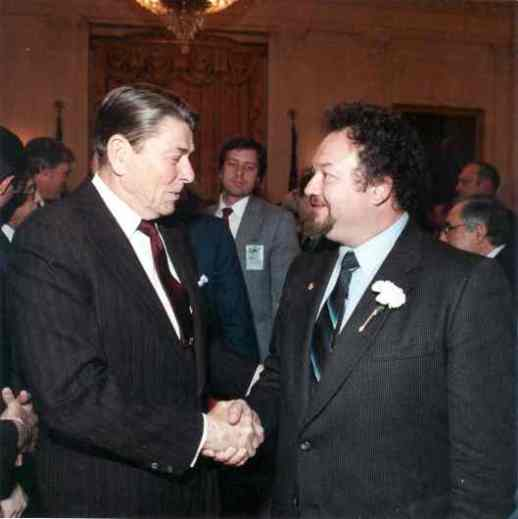
Ackerman with President Ronald Reagan in 1985

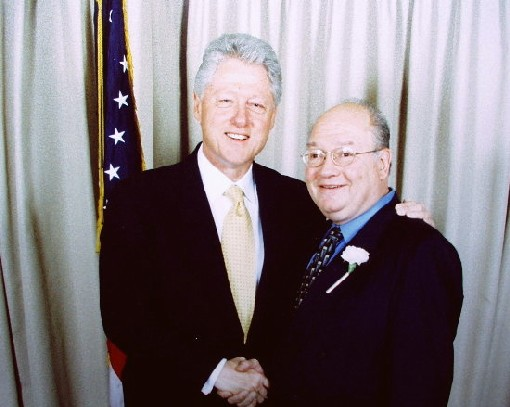
Ackerman with former president Bill Clinton in 2002

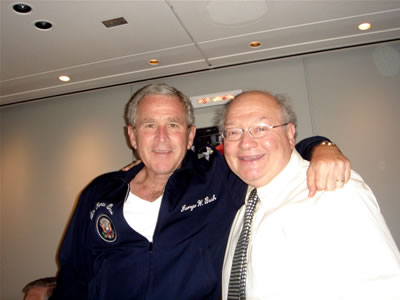
Ackerman with President George W. Bush in 2006

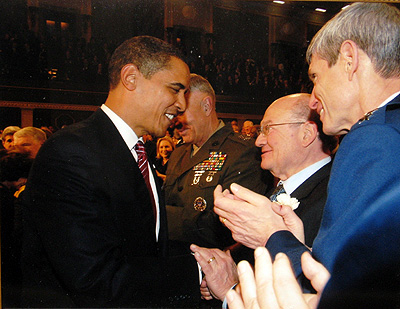
Ackerman with President Barack Obama in 2009

=== Elections ===
Incumbent Democratic U.S. congressman Benjamin Rosenthal died on January 4, 1983. Ackerman won the special election with a plurality of 49%. In 1984, he won re-election to a full term with 69% of the vote. In 1986, he won re-election with 77%, and was unopposed in 1988 and 1990. After redistricting, he ran in New York's 5th congressional district. He won the Democratic primary with 60%, and the general election with 52% against Republican county legislator Allan E. Binder. In 1994, he won re-election with 55% of the vote. Since then, he has won re-election with at least 63% of the vote.

On March 15, 2012, Ackerman announced that he would retire at the end of the 112th Congress on January 3, 2013, after fifteen terms, and would not seek re-election in November 2012.

=== Tenure ===
Ackerman was the Congressional delegate to the United Nations. In addition, he was the ranking Democrat on the Congressional Caucus on India and Indian Americans. In 2002, he was awarded India's third highest civilian award, the Padma Bhushan for his contributions as member of the India Caucus in the Congress.

Ackerman was one of only 22 Congressman and one of 2 Democrats from New York to vote against a resolution calling for the protection of the symbols and traditions of Christmas. The resolution, which did not include language that would protect the symbols of other religious holidays, passed 401–22 in the House in December 2005. In April 2003 the Catholic League for religious and civil rights attacked Ackerman for voting against a non-binding resolution that would have declared a day of prayer in recognition of the U.S. war in Iraq.

Ackerman received an "A" on the Drum Major Institute's 2005 Congressional Scorecard on middle-class issues. Ackerman was also a member of the Cuba Democracy Caucus and is currently the head of the International Council of Jewish Parliamentarians (ICJP).

Ackerman has missed voting on 80 occasions pertaining to a variety of issues, including the Pension Protection Act, the Tax Relief Extension Reconciliation Act, and the Honoring the Contributions of Catholic Schools.

In June 2001, Ackerman honored King Christian X of Denmark for his wearing a yellow badge armband during World War II in support of the Danish Jews who had been ordered by the Nazi occupation to wear yellow badges, although Jews in Denmark were never forced to wear an armband, and the story is merely a legend.

==== Health ====
Among Ackerman's significant legislative undertakings, was the passage of his Baby AIDS amendment to the Ryan White Care Act. The measure requires mandatory HIV testing of newborns and disclosure of the results to the mother.

Ackerman championed the issue of newborn testing after discovering that 45 states, including New York, tested babies for HIV but used the data solely to track the prevalence of the disease in the population, and did not disclose the results to the mothers. As a result, thousands of mothers brought their infants home from the hospital, never aware that their children had tested positive for HIV. Ackerman stopped the anonymous testing from being reinstated in years that followed.

Ackerman also scored a victory in his efforts to ban downed animals from being sold as meat in supermarkets, restaurants and butcher stores. For a decade, Ackerman warned that use of such livestock was not only inhumane treatment of animals but also risked causing a Mad Cow disaster in the United States. His legislation fell on deaf ears until December 2003, when his warning became prophetic and the Bush Administration—among those who had opposed the bill—finally imposed his ban through regulation.

Ackerman was also successful in getting Medicare to cover testing for prostate cancer.

In addition, Ackerman sponsored the first federal legislation to ban the use of handheld cell phones while driving.

==== Finance ====
Law of the land is Ackerman's measure requiring banks and financial companies to notify consumers when negative information is placed on their credit reports. Ackerman also sponsored legislation which is now law that in the wake of the Enron, WorldCom and other corporate scandals, prohibits accounting firms from consulting for the companies they audit.

On October 3, 2008, Ackerman voted in favor of the Troubled Asset Relief Program.

On January 8, 2009, Ackerman introduced a bill to order the Securities and Exchange Commission to re-institute the uptick rule, limiting the circumstances under which traders can sell stock short.

On February 4, 2009, Ackerman criticized SEC Officials over the handling of tips given to them about the Bernie Madoff scandal. Ackerman believed that he was reflecting the public's opinion, saying: "How are they supposed to have confidence that if somebody goes to you with a complaint—gives it to you on a silver platter with all the investigations, with all the numbers, with all of the data, telling you exactly what he did, how he did it, and why he did it and how he knows that—and after a period after half a dozen or eight years, you don't know anything?"

==== Foreign policy and terrorism ====
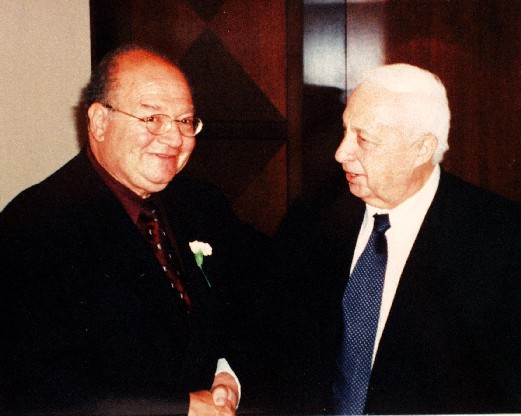
Ackerman with Israeli prime minister Ariel Sharon in 2001

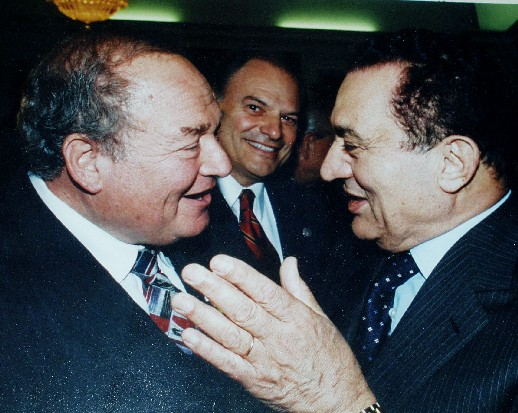
Ackerman with Egyptian president Hosni Mubarak in 2003

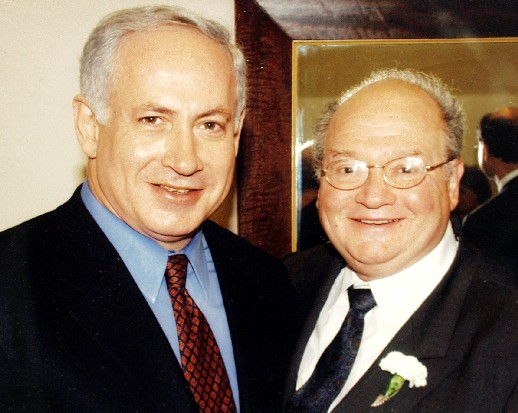
Ackerman with Israeli prime minister Benjamin Netanyahu in 2003

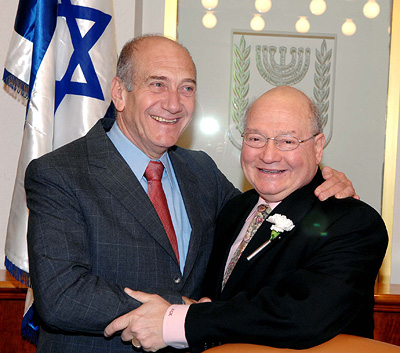
Ackerman with Israeli prime minister Ehud Olmert in 2007

On October 10, 2002, Ackerman was among the 81 House Democrats who voted in favor of authorizing the invasion of Iraq.

Ackerman also convinced the Defense Department to stop garnishing wages from certain U.S. soldiers serving in the war against Iraq. Although troops who serve in combat zones are not required to pay federal taxes, many soldiers had failed to be granted the exemption.

Other highlights include the Congressman authoring legislation that required President George W. Bush to impose sanctions against the Palestinian Authority for not complying with peace agreements it signed with the U.S. and Israel.

In his capacity as the then chairman of the Asia Subcommittee, Ackerman made history in the 1990s by traveling to North Korea to discuss non-proliferation. Upon his return to South Korea, Ackerman became the first person since the Korean War to cross the DMZ (Demilitarized Zone).

Enacted as well was his measure that prevents war criminals and human rights abusers who have perpetrated genocide, torture, terrorism or other atrocities, from entering the U.S. and deports those who have slipped in.

He convinced the German government to establish a US$110 million fund to compensate 18,000 Holocaust survivors and to investigate whether 3,300 former Nazi soldiers now living in the U.S. and collecting German pensions are war criminals.

Ackerman is also well known for his many missions to feed the starving people of Ethiopia and the Sudan and for playing a leading role in the rescue of Ethiopian Jews and aiding their emigration to Israel. Active in the Middle East peace process, Ackerman has met with the current and most past Israeli prime ministers and the heads of all the Arab countries in an effort to help secure peace in the region. He also ventured to Kashmir enduring sub-freezing winter temperatures in an attempt to secure the release of four western hostages.

In January 2011, Ackerman criticized Jewish organizations including the Jewish Voice for Peace and J Street for their perspective of what actions had to be taken for a lasting Mideast peace.

On January 12, 2009, Ackerman admitted to arranging a visit between Israeli officials and a defense contractor at the same time he was investing in that contractor. Although the visit did not result in any official deal between the parties, questions regarding his ethics were raised.

Ackerman was also successful in getting enacted, his bill that created the "Heroes" postage stamp, the revenue from which helps the families of rescue workers killed or permanently disabled while responding to the September 11 attacks. The stamp was based on a photograph entitled Ground Zero Spirit. In addition, the Congressman lobbied federal security officials—with the September 11, 2001, attacks in mind—to use retired law enforcement officers as screeners at New York airports and he pressed President Bush to make good on his promise to provide New York with US$20 billion in additional 9/11 disaster aid.

In 2011, Ackerman voted to extend expiring provisions of the PATRIOT Act and voted in favor of the National Defense Authorization Act (NDAA) for Fiscal Year 2012.

==== State and local issues ====
Ackerman participated in forcing the State of Hawaii to change its law that forbade blind individuals from bringing their guide dogs with them to the islands. The Congressman chaired an investigation and bipartisan hearing into whether New York City and Long Island officials properly used the spraying of Malathion during the West Nile virus outbreak. He also obtained federal funds to combat a return of the virus.

=== Committee assignments ===
- Committee on Financial Services
  - Subcommittee on Capital Markets, Insurance, and Government-Sponsored Enterprises
  - Subcommittee on Financial Institutions and Consumer Credit
- Committee on Foreign Affairs
  - Subcommittee on Asia and the Pacific
  - Subcommittee on the Middle East and South Asia (Ranking Member)

=== Caucus memberships ===
- Congressional Arts Caucus
- Congressional Caucus on India and Indian Americans

== Personal life ==
Ackerman, who sports a white carnation boutonnière each day, lives on a houseboat named the Unsinkable II while in Washington, D.C., and otherwise resides in Roslyn Heights in Nassau County with his wife Rita, having moved there from a home in Jamaica Estates, Queens that sold for US$1 million in 2008. The Ackermans have three children: Lauren, Corey, and Ari. Ackerman is an amateur photographer, an avid stamp collector, and a boating enthusiast. He is also an Eagle Scout.

At the 2006 meeting of the International Council of Jewish Parliamentarians (ICJP), Ackerman was unanimously elected to serve as the executive of the organization.

Ackerman was named an honorary graduate of the United States Merchant Marine Academy for his continued support of the service academy located in Kings Point, New York.

Ackerman also has a street named after him located in Central Islip, New York.

=== Sexual assault accusation ===
In the 1960s, Ackerman served as director of the Ten Mile River Boy Scout Camp. In 2019, a former camper filed a lawsuit accusing Ackerman of fondling him and forcing him to perform oral sex on Ackerman. The alleged abuse occurred in 1966, when Ackerman was 23 and the accuser was 17. Ackerman denied any wrongdoing but resigned from his position as a consultant for the Suffolk County Department of Civil Service.

== See also ==
- List of Jewish members of the United States Congress
- Franklin Child Prostitution Ring
- List of Queens College people

U.S. House of Representatives
Preceded by Benjamin S. Rosenthal	Member of the U.S. House of Representatives from New York's 7th congressional district 1983–1993	Succeeded by Thomas J. Manton
Preceded by Raymond J. McGrath	Member of the U.S. House of Representatives from New York's 5th congressional district 1993–2013	Succeeded by Gregory Meeks
U.S. order of precedence (ceremonial)
Preceded by Edolphus Towns as Former U.S. Representative	Order of precedence of the United States as Former U.S. Representative	Succeeded by Jose E. Serrano as Former U.S. Representative
