= Michael S. McPherson =

American economist

Michael S. McPherson is an American economist who was the 15th president of Macalester College between 1996 and 2003. Before Macalester, McPherson taught economics at Williams College, where he was also chair of economics department and dean of the faculty. After leaving Macalester, he led the Spencer Foundation for fourteen years before retiring in 2017, where he is president emeritus.

== Education ==
McPherson graduated from the University of Chicago with a bachelor's degree in mathematics in 1967. He continued at the University of Chicago for his graduate studies, and received a PhD in economics in 1974.

== Career ==
Before joining Macalester, taught at Williams College for twenty-two years as a professor of economics. At Williams he was also chair of the Economics Department and dean of the faculty. McPherson's academic work mainly focuses on the relationship between economics and higher education. He has co-written several books with economist Morton O. Schapiro, the 16th president of Williams College and 16th president of Northwestern University.

As president of Macalester, McPherson changed the organization of the Presbyterian-affiliated college's chaplaincy, also making Macalester's chaplain the associate dean of religious and spiritual life.

McPherson has had fellowships from the Institute for Advanced Study in Princeton, the Brookings Institution, the Mellon Foundation, and the Urban Institute. He served on the board of Wesleyan University, and is an advisor at the Institute for Research in the Social Sciences at Stanford University. McPherson is a fellow of both the American Academy of Arts and Sciences and the American Philosophical Society, and in 2022 he spoke at a Northwestern University symposium honoring Morton Schapiro.

== Works ==
- McPherson, Michael; Schapiro, Morton (1990). Selective Admission and the Public Interest. College Board. ISBN 978-0-87447-399-5
- McPherson, Michael; Schapiro, Morton (1991). Keeping College Affordable: Government and Educational Opportunity. Brookings Institution Press. ISBN 978-0-8157-5641-5
- McPherson, Michael; Schapiro, Morton; Winston, Gordon (1994). Paying the Piper: Productivity, Incentives, and Financing in U.S. Higher Education. University of Michigan Press. ISBN 978-0-472-10404-8
- Michael S. McPherson and Morton Owen Schapiro, The Student Aid Game: Meeting Need and Rewarding Talent in American Higher Education (Princeton: Princeton University Press, 1998)
- McPherson, Michael; Schapiro, Morton (2006). College Access: Opportunity or Privilege?. College Board. ISBN 978-0-87447-774-0
- McPherson, Michael; Schapiro, Morton (2008). College Success: What It Means and How to Make It Happen. College Board. ISBN 978-0-87447-830-3
- Bowen, William G; Chingos, Matthew M; McPherson M. S (2009). Crossing the Finish Line: Completing College at America's Public Universities. Princeton University Press.
- Brighouse, Harry; McPherson (2015). The Aims of Higher Education: Problems of Morality and Justice. University of Chicago Press.
