= Chuck Stone =

Tuskegee Airman and journalist (1924–2014)

- Chuck Stone
- Born: Charles Sumner Stone, Jr. July 21, 1924; St. Louis, Missouri
- Died: April 6, 2014 (aged 89) near Chapel Hill, North Carolina
- Education: Wesleyan University; University of Chicago
- Military career
- Allegiance: United States
- Branch: United States Army Air Forces, Tuskegee Airman
- Conflicts: World War II
- Awards: Congressional Gold Medal awarded to Tuskegee Airmen
- Other work: newspaper editor, columnist, professor of journalism, author

Charles Sumner "Chuck" Stone, Jr. (July 21, 1924 – April 6, 2014) was an American pilot, newspaper editor, journalism professor, and author. He was a member of the Tuskegee Airmen during World War II and was the first president of the National Association of Black Journalists, serving in office from 1975 to 1977. Passionate about racial issues and supportive of many liberal causes, he refused to follow any party line, "but called the issues as he saw them."

== Early life ==
Chuck Stone was born July 21, 1924, in St. Louis, Missouri, to Charles Sumner Stone Sr and Madeline Chafin and raised in Hartford, Connecticut. His father was a business manager for a nearby college, and his mother was a payroll officer for the Hartford Board of Education. Stone graduated from Hartford Public High School in 1942 with honors, and from there proceeded to go into the army. Stone served in World War II, where he was member of the Tuskegee Airmen. He had already been admitted to Harvard University after completing his military service, but chose instead to matriculate at Wesleyan University, receiving degrees in political science and economics. He was the first African-American undergraduate in several decades at Wesleyan, graduating in the class of 1948 and serving as the commencement speaker. Stone subsequently received a master's degree in sociology from the University of Chicago. After completing his education, he worked for the Chicago department store Carson Pirie Scott, serving as the store's first African-American executive. He then studied law for eighteen months at the University of Connecticut before spending two years in Egypt, Gaza, and India as a representative for CARE.

== Professional career ==
=== Journalist and educator ===
Chuck Stone's career in journalism began in 1958, when his friend Al Duckett, then editor of The New York Age, hired him as a reporter, and then promoted him to editor. Stone also wrote articles for the Pittsburgh Courier and the Washington D.C. edition of the Afro-American before being hired as editor-in-chief of The Chicago Defender in August 1963.

Years later, Stone worked as a columnist for The Philadelphia Daily News from 1972 to 1991. Stone was very critical of the Philadelphia Police Department's record of brutality towards African-Americans, which made him a trusted middleman between Philadelphia police and criminal suspects, more than 75 of whom 'surrendered' to Stone rather than to the cops.

In 1975, he was the M. Lyle Spencer Visiting Professor of Journalism in the S. I. Newhouse School of Public Communications at Syracuse University. He taught journalism at the University of Delaware for seven years, and from 1986 to 1988 he served as the House Advisor for the Martin Luther King Humanities House at the University of Delaware. Stone later became the Walter Spearman Professor at the University of North Carolina at Chapel Hill, where he retired in 2005.

Stone was nominated twice for the Pulitzer Prize, and was inducted into the National Association of Black Journalists Hall of Fame in August 2004. On March 29, 2007, Stone attended a ceremony in the United States Capitol rotunda, where he and the other veteran Tuskegee Airmen (or their widows) were awarded the Congressional Gold Medal by President George W. Bush in recognition of the Airmen's service during World War II.

Stone was known for his passionate and bold personality. The New York Times refers to him as the "Fiery, Trusted Columnist" and journalist Dennis Jackson once did a segment on him titled, "The Outspoken Mr. Stone."

=== Civil rights ===
Chuck Stone became associated with the Civil Rights Movement and the Black Power movement while working as an editor at Harlem's New York Age, the Washington, D.C. Afro-American, and the Chicago Daily Defender. He also served three years as a special assistant and speechwriter for Rep. Adam Clayton Powell Jr. of the 22nd congressional district of New York, chair of the House Education and Labor Committee. In 1966 Stone was a member of a steering committee organized by Powell to discuss the meaning of the Black Power Movement.

In addition, he often served as a mediator between criminals and the police for over 20 years. His most notable role was during the negotiation of the 5-day Graterford Prison hostage crisis of 1981, in which Stone entered negotiations on day 4 of a stalemate between escaped prisoners and 29 hostages. Stone served as a go-between and successfully negotiated the end of the stand-off, for which he "gained wide credibility."

His book, "Black Political Power in America," analyzes ethnic political power as seen in the United States and encourages Black citizens to vote in a block in order to consolidate their voice in America, much as the Italians and Irish did in the past. This work, along with "Tell It Like It Is" and his other articles, draw attention to the racial inequalities in America and advocate for change. On May 5, 2025 he was posthumously awarded a special citation by the Pulitzer Prizes.

== Awards ==
- Congressional Gold Medal awarded to Tuskegee Airmen in 2006
- Nominated twice for Pulitzer Prize
- Free Spirit Award from the Freedom Forum 1993
- Thomas Jefferson Award from University of North Carolina-Chapel Hill 2002
- Trailblazer Award from Greensboro's Sit-In Movement, Inc. 2005
- Special Citation on 2025 Pulitzer Prize Awards

== Personal life ==
Stone was a member of Alpha Phi Alpha fraternity. He was a member of the fraternity's World Policy Council, a think tank whose purpose is to expand Alpha Phi Alpha's involvement in politics, and social and current policy to encompass international concerns. He was married to Louise Davis Stone for 49 years before they divorced. They are the parents of Krishna Stone, Allegra Stone and Charles Stone III, creator and star of the Budweiser "Whassup!" television commercials, and director of movies such as Drumline, Mr. 3000, and Paid In Full.

== Death and legacy ==
Stone died April 6, 2014, at the age of 89. He was survived by his three children, one grandchild, and two sisters. Bob Butler, president of the NABJ from 2013 to 2015, has named Stone to be the "guiding force behind the NABJ," and the key to the organization's longevity. Butler has credited Stone with helping to improve diversity in newsroom management, stating that "what (diversity) does exist is because of Chuck and the other founders of the NABJ." The Chuck Stone Program for Diversity in Education and Media is a workshop for rising high school seniors at the Hussman School of Journalism and Media, formerly known as the School of Journalism and Mass Communication. The program, which began in 2007, honors the legacy of Chuck Stone, who retired from the school in 2005. The Chuck Stone Papers are housed in the Rubenstein Rare Book and Manuscript Library as part of the John Hope Franklin Center at Duke University.

In 2025, the "Pulitzer Prize" gave Chuck Stone a special citation: "A special citation is awarded to the late Chuck Stone for his groundbreaking work as a journalist covering the Civil Rights Movement, his pioneering role as the first Black columnist at the Philadelphia Daily News–later syndicated to nearly 100 publications–and for co-founding the National Association of Black Journalists 50 years ago."

== Written works ==
=== Non-fiction ===
- Tell It Like It Is. Trident Press, 1967. ASIN B0006BUBAC.
- Black Political Power in America. Bobbs-Merrill Company, 1968. ASIN B0006BW47U.
- "Black Political Power in the Carter Era". The Black Scholar (19776

=== Fiction ===
- King Strut (novel). Bobbs-Merrill Company, 1970. ASIN B0006CF6VK.
- Squizzy the Black Squirrel: A Fabulous Fable of Friendship. Open Hand Publishing, 2003. ISBN 0940880717.

== See also ==
- Executive Order 9981
- List of Tuskegee Airmen
- Military history of African Americans
- The Tuskegee Airmen (movie)
