= Queens Tribune =

Alt-weekly newspaper serving New York City

- Type: Weekly newspaper
- Founder: Gary Ackerman
- Founded: February 1970
- Language: English
- Headquarters: Queens, New York
- ISSN: 1521-2122
- Website: www.queenstribune.com

The Queens Tribune was a free weekly newspaper founded as the monthly Flushing Tribune in February 1970 by Gary Ackerman. The Tribune was a member of the New York Press Association.

From 1989 to 2002, the paper was owned by News Communications, parent of The Hill. Ackerman then repurchased the paper. The paper's main offices moved to Whitestone from Fresh Meadows, Queens in November 2010. The paper was sold to Phoenix Media in 2013.

The Tribune is published in nine different sections, eight specific to different neighborhoods or regions of the borough, which are mostly the same except for the "This Week" section that includes one or two stories from that specific neighborhoods. The eight different sections are Astoria, Jackson Heights, Western Queens, South Queens, Forest Hills, Flushing, Bayside, and East Queens. The ninth edition is a "Queens Edition" which does not have any specific "This Week" page and is given out to subscribers.

Every month, the newspaper issues a special edition, called "glossy" issues, that focuses on a given topic. Recurring examples include the "Blue Book", or the annual Guide to Queens every January, Best of Queens, Arts & Culture, Gay Pride, and Community Characters editions.

The Tribune is also home to a newspaper called The PRESS of Southeast Queens, a separate paper that covers Jamaica, Queens and other Southeast Queens neighborhoods like Rosedale, Saint Albans, Hollis, Springfield Gardens, Cambria Heights, Queens Village, Addisleigh Park and Laurelton. The PRESS occasionally runs the same stories as the Tribune and vice versa.

In 2018, the paper was sold to Ocean Gold Media and moved its headquarters from Whitestone to Long Island City. The format changed from a tabloid to a broadsheet and it ceased to publish separate local "This Week" editions. Ocean Gold also stopped the publication of The Press of Southeast Queens, as they relaunched The Press—a new city-wide magazine focused on people of color and immigrant communities.

On December 17, 2018, much of the staff of the Tribune was laid off and Ocean Gold announced the paper would discontinue publishing while seeking new financial backing. Ocean Gold told other reporters that they were seeking buyers for the cash-strapped paper. Ocean Gold took over "a million dollars in debt" when it purchased the Tribune earlier in the year, and consolidated much of the debt during their ownership.

As of June 2019, the Tribune has not resumed publishing and the website is dead.
