= The Villager (Manhattan) =

Local newspaper in Manhattan, New York City

- Type: Weekly newspaper
- Format: Tabloid
- Owner: Schneps Media
- Publisher: Victoria Schneps-Yunis, Joshua Schneps
- Founded: 1933
- Language: English
- Headquarters: New York City, New York
- Country: United States
- Circulation: 6,200 (as of 2017)
- ISSN: 0042-6202
- Website: www.thevillager.com

The Villager is a weekly newspaper serving Downtown Manhattan.

== Background ==
Founded in 1933 by Walter and Isabel Bryan, it is part of Schneps Media, whose Manhattan portfolio includes Downtown Express, Gay City News (formerly LGNY), Chelsea Now, Villager Express (formerly East Villager), AM New York, and Manhattan Express.

In 2001, 2004 and 2005, The Villager won the Stuart Dorman Award, honoring New York State's best weekly newspaper, in the New York Press Association's Better Newspaper Contest. It has also been called better than The New York Times by New York magazine: In 2005, in its "123 Reasons Why We Love New York Right Now," New York dubbed The New York Times Reason #51, "because our hometown paper is still the greatest in the world," the magazine said...before adding, #52, on the facing page: "...next to The Villager."

In September 2018, NYC Community Media, The Villager's owner, and Community News Group, were sold by Les and Jennifer Goodstein to Schneps Communications. Schneps also has extensive publications in Queens, Brooklyn, The Bronx, Westchester and Long Island.
