= Lyle M. Spencer =

American philanthropist (1911–1968)

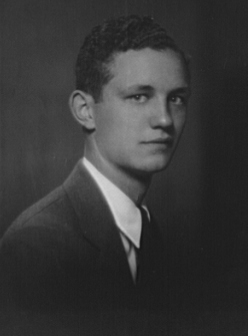
- Spencer in 1930
- Born: Lyle Manly Spencer; 10 May 1911; Atlanta, Georgia, U.S.
- Died: 21 August 1968 (aged 57); Chicago, Illinois, U.S.
- Occupation: Philanthropist

Lyle Manly Spencer (May 10, 1911 – August 21, 1968) was an American philanthropist. In 1938, he was a 27-year-old graduate student in sociology at the University of Chicago when he founded Science Research Associates (SRA), the educational publishing firm which provided the basis of his wealth and ultimately made possible the creation of The Spencer Foundation.

== Early life and education ==
Spencer was born in Atlanta to M. Lyle Spencer and Lois Hill. His parents divorced after 10 years of marriage. He spent much of his childhood in Appleton, Wisconsin, where his father was an English professor at Lawrence University. He received his undergraduate and master's degrees in sociology from the University of Washington in Seattle, where his father was president from 1927 to 1933; he then continued his graduate work in sociology at the University of Chicago.

== Career ==
The Spencer Foundation was established formally in 1962. That same year, Spencer, as President of SRA, testified before Congress and made explicit his belief in the reformative power of well-funded education research: "In my judgment, hard-minded, sensible investments in educational research can provide the most effective single method of strengthening our schools." Speaking to employees of his firm in 1961, Spencer noted that SRA was initially a nonprofit organization that "nearly went broke in the first year before we gave up that idea... We reorganized as a commercial firm in 1939 and have been going up ever since."

Spencer's colleagues at SRA and his friends in higher education referred to him as a businessman who was always an educator, a man who was a researcher all his life. Charles Dollard, Spencer's friend and one of the original directors of the Spencer Foundation, noted, "Lyle had a passionate belief in education as the modus vivendi of a democratic society. He was particularly concerned both professionally and personally with the education of the young. He liked to say that it was quite as important where one went to kindergarten as where one went to college." While at SRA's helm, Spencer served as a trustee of three universities, was a director of what is now the United Negro College Fund, and sat on the visiting committees for education at Harvard University and the University of Chicago.

== Sale of SRA ==
In 1964, SRA was purchased by IBM, but Spencer continued as the firm's chief executive and guiding spirit until his death in 1968. After the sale of SRA to IBM in 1964, Spencer realized the potential impact his now much-increased fortune could have on the course of educational research throughout the world. His personal memoranda, sketchy yet impassioned notes outlining his vision for the Foundation, reveal a concern for individual people and the individual learning process, a desire to support educational projects that lacked other sources of funding, and an interest in a grassroots approach to improving generally educational opportunities both here and abroad: "Improve learning process, including diffusion into developing countries;" "Maybe non-cognitive;" "Prejudiced against bricks and mortar;" "All support periods finite;" "Projects where other money not readily available at this point;" "Tend to bet on people even more than the project itself."

== Death ==
On August 21, 1968, Lyle Spencer died of pancreatic cancer at Passavant Hospital in Chicago, Illinois. He was buried in Appleton, Wisconsin.

== See also ==
- The Spencer Foundation
