= Bronx Times-Reporter =

Weekly newspaper in New York City

- Type: Weekly newspaper
- Format: Tabloid
- Owner: Schneps Media
- Founder(s): John Collazzi and Michael Benedetto
- Publisher: Laura Guerriero
- Editor: Christian Falcone
- Founded: 1981; 44 years ago
- Language: English
- Headquarters: 3602 East Tremont Avenue, Suite 205 Bronx, NY 10465
- City: Bronx
- Country: United States
- Circulation: 9,859 (as of 2017)
- Sister newspapers: The Brooklyn Paper
- Website: bxtimes.com

The Bronx Times-Reporter is a weekly newspaper published in the Bronx, New York. It was co-founded in 1981 by John Collazzi and Assemblyman Michael Benedetto.

The Bronx Times-Reporter covers local news and publishes columns by local community organizations. It is sold on many local newsstands and available through subscription. Many branches of the New York Public Library in the Bronx have back issues of the paper.

The paper has three editions, all of which publish on Thursdays: a Bronx Times-Reporter that covers Throggs Neck, one that covers Morris Park, and a third paper, called the Bronx Times, that covers news from Castle Hill, Parkchester, and surrounding neighborhoods, and is distributed for free.

In 2006, the Community Newspaper Group, an affiliate of Rupert Murdoch's News Corporation, purchased the Bronx Times-Reporter. In 2014, News Corp sold its Community Newspaper Group to former company executive Les Goodstein and his wife Jennifer. Schneps Media acquired Community News Group in September 2018.

== Web site ==
- Official website
