= The New York Sporting Whip =

19th-century New York City newspaper

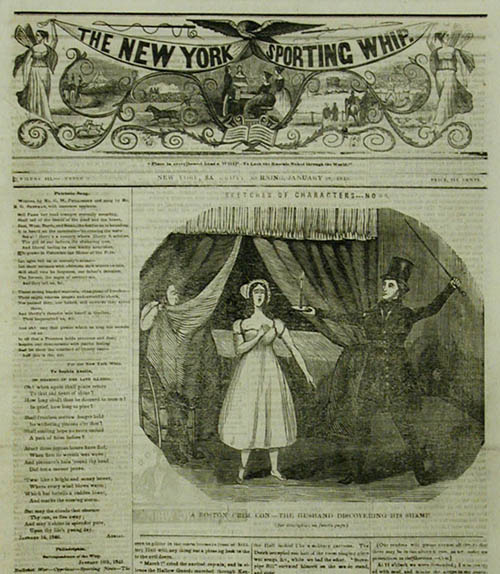
The New York Sporting Whip

The New York Sporting Whip was a 19th-century New York City newspaper. It was one of several penny or flash publications popular at the time.
