= Gay City News =

Weekly LGBT+ newspaper in New York City

Gay City News /; gcn
- gcn cover (June 25, 2020)
- Type: LGBT newspaper
- Owner: Schneps Media
- Founder(s): Troy Masters, Paul Schindler
- Publisher: Victoria Schneps-Unis
- President: Victoria Schneps-Unis
- Editor: Paul Schindler
- Founded: 1994
- Language: English
- Headquarters: New York City
- Sister newspapers: The Villager, Long Island Press, Metro Philadelphia
- Website: gaycitynews.com

Gay City News (stylized as gcn) is a free weekly LGBT newspaper based in New York City focusing on local and national issues relating to LGBT community. It was founded in 1994 as Lesbian Gay New York, later LGNY, and was sold to Community Media LLC, owner of The Villager, in 2002, which renamed the publication. In 2012, Community Media LLC was acquired by NYC Commnunity Media, which later became part of Scheps Media in 2018. It is the largest LGBT newspaper in the United States, with a circulation of 47,000.

== Background ==
Gay City News came into existence after several incarnations. The newspaper began to form in the late 1980s after the collapse of the LGBT newsmagazine OutWeek (which came into existence in 1989 to compete against the then-dominant New York Native—which itself folded in 1997). OutWeek was known for firebrand activist style journalism and provided coverage of a then nascent gay rights movement. It was one of the first publications to undertake scientific reporting on the growing AIDS crisis.

After an investor squabble that closed the magazine, Troy Masters, then an advertising director at OutWeek, led the formation of a group to create a new publication; that publication became known as QW (or QueerWeek), the first glossy gay magazine, and was funded by William F. Chafin. Chafin died before the publication could make a profit, and the magazine was closed upon his death.

== Establishment ==
Two years later, in 1994, Masters sought to establish a newspaper and founded LGNY (which stood for "Lesbian-Gay New York"). LGNY published for eight years as an independent biweekly newspaper and was relaunched in 2002 as Gay City News. after being sold to John W. Sutter's Community Media LLC, publisher of The Villager and Downtown Express.

Masters continued in his role as publisher until leaving the publication in 2015. He moved to Los Angeles and partnered with the Washington Blade to launch and publish the Los Angeles Blade, now the only LGBT weekly newspaper serving Los Angeles.

Paul Schindler served as the editor-in-chief of Gay City News for nearly two decades before retirigin in 2021. Following his retirement, Matt Tracy stepped into the role of editor-in-chief. Under Schenps Media's ownership, gay City News transitioned toward a digital-first publishing model whiole maintaining print distribution across Manhtaan, Brooklyn, Queens, and the Bronx. Its president and publisher is Victoria Schneps-Yunis.

== Coverage and major stories ==
Gay City News established a reputation for investigating and reporting on HIV/AIDS healthcare policy, civil rights litigation, criminal justice issues affecting the LGBTQ+ community, and local New York government affairs.

Key coverage includes:

- Detailed tracking of the marriage equality movement in New York, leading up to the passage of the Marriage Equality Act in 2011.
- Investigative reporting on anti-LGBTA+ hate crimes in New York City and police responses.
- Ongoing coverage of trans healthcare access, housing discrimination, and sex work decriminalization debates in New York State.

== See also ==
- LGBT culture in New York City
