= The Brooklyn Baron =

Daily newspaper, local coverage

The Brooklyn Baron was a weekly newspaper focused on "news in around the neighborhoods of Bergen Beach and Coney Island."

They had writers and a managing editor.

== Overview ==
In mid 1997 they ran a full page profile of a Holocaust survivor who was shot, helped by a non-Jewish farmer, and after the war went back to where her family home had stood. She described it as "burnt to the ground." In Brooklyn she married and built a family, and years later was told that for some technical reason reparations were denied.

Their "Hush Hush" item about how in 1943 there were 4 things a sailor could not say in a letter home and 12 "a sailor can say" (part of #1 is "You can say you were born, if you don't say where") was reprinted.

The Brooklyn Public Library's microfilm collection, which only has issues from 1997, described it as having "a law section ... and includes editorials by prominent New York politicians."

The Brooklyn Baron also carried cartoons, and works by local writers.

== History ==
The paper's name was trademarked late 1996 by B&B Publishing.
