= Matthew Spencer (politician) =

American politician

Member of New Hampshire House of Representatives for Strafford 18
- In office 2016 – December 4, 2018

Personal details
- Party: Republican

Matthew L. Spencer is an American politician. He was a member of the New Hampshire House of Representatives from 2016 to 2018.

In the 2022 New Hampshire House of Representatives election, he was a candidate for Strafford 12.
