= Urdu Times =

Urdu newspaper in New York

- Type: Weekly
- Founder: Khalil-ur-Rehman
- Editor: Khalil-ur-Rehman
- Founded: 1980; 46 years ago
- Language: Urdu
- Headquarters: New York City
- Website: www.urdutimesusa.com

The Urdu Times is a free newspaper written in Urdu from New York. It was first published in 1980, and over the years, the Urdu Times extended the area of publication and is now being published in New York, Washington, D.C., Atlanta, Miami, Detroit, Chicago, Houston, Los Angeles, Mississauga (a suburb of Toronto), Montreal, London, Birmingham and Manchester.

Khalil-ur-Rehman is the chief editor of Urdu Times. In Canada, the paper is headed by Mohammad Azam Gondal and Tahir Chaudhary in the United Kingdom.

In 1980, it was a 4-page newspaper. Since there was no internet or Pakistani channels and the telephone was very expensive, to get the news Khali-ur-Rahman used to pick up the latest copies of the Pakistani Urdu newspapers from the Pakistan International Airlines' staff that used to fly with the flight from Pakistan. Most of the pages were prepared by cutting and pasting the news from the old daily Pakistani papers while the latest few news were received by telephone the day before the publication. Also, since there were no computers, Mr. Rahman hired the lone Urdu 'Katib' (calligrapher) in New York city to write the headlines.

The process of publishing the paper went through several evolutionary steps and today 80% of the news editing and page making gets done in the Urdu Times office in Lahore Pakistan. The finalized pages are transmitted via Internet to various printing presses all over North America.

The Urdu Times has also organized international Urdu conferences in North America.

== Notes ==
=== Further reading ===
- Thacker, Purvi (April 20, 2014). "Urdu Times: The News Room". The Express Tribune.
