= Spencer Foundation =

American educational organization

- Founded: 1962
- Founder: Lyle M. Spencer
- Type: 501(c)(3) nonprofit organization
- Purpose: Education research foundation
- Headquarters: Chicago, Illinois
- Key people: Na'ilah Suad Nasir (President)
- Website: spencer.org

The Spencer Foundation is an independent foundation based in Chicago, Illinois, that supports education research. It was founded in 1962 by Lyle M. Spencer, and funds studies, fellowships, and other programs focused on understanding and improving education in the United States and internationally. Since beginning its grantmaking in 1971, the foundation has awarded more than $500 million. It is currently led by its president, Na'ilah Suad Nasir.

== Founder ==
Lyle M. Spencer the founder of the Spencer Foundation, received bachelor’s and master’s degrees from the University of Washington, and studied at the University of Chicago under a University Fellowship and a Marshall Field Fellowship in Sociology.

In 1938, Spencer co-founded Science Research Associates, Inc. (SRA), a commercial publisher of standardized tests.

In 1962, Spencer created The Spencer Foundation using the wealth generated by SRA. He would later write, “All the Spencer dough was earned, improbably from education. It makes sense, therefore, that much of this money should be returned eventually to investigating ways in which education can be improved, around the world.”

In 1964, SRA was acquired by the International Business Machines Corporation (IBM), and in 1966, Spencer was elected a director of IBM.

Spencer died at the age of 57 on August 21, 1968.

== History ==
The Spencer Foundation was founded in 1962 by Lyle M. Spencer. It remains one of the leading funders of education research in the United States.

Upon Spencer's death in 1968, the foundation received a large endowment. The bulk of the endowment came from Spencer’s IBM shares, which amounted to about $71.6 million. With these resources, the foundation began making formal grants in 1971. As of 2020, its grants have totaled more than $500 million.

=== Leadership ===
Henry Thomas James was the first president of the Spencer Foundation. He led the organization until 1985. He was succeeded by Lawrence A. Cremin, who held the position until his death in 1990. Patricia Albjerg Graham was the foundation's third president, holding the role from 1991 until 2000. She was followed by Ellen Condliffe Lagemann, president from 2000 to 2002, and Michael S. McPherson, president of from 2003 to 2017.

In 2025, the foundation is led by Na’ilah Suad Nasir, who was named president in 2017.

== Programs ==
The Spencer Foundation supports education research through a range of grants, fellowships, and research programs. Its programs are designed to advance the understanding of education and identify ways it can be improved around the world.

== Fellowships ==
The Spencer Foundation also supports education research through fellowships aimed at strengthening and renewing the educational research community. These programs provide funding and professional development to researchers addressing critical issues in the history, theory, and practice of education both nationally and internationally.

The foundation partners with the National Academy of Education to administer two longstanding fellowship programs:

=== National Academy of Education/Spencer Foundation Dissertation Fellowship Program ===
Through this program, the foundation awards 35 dissertation fellowships annually to doctoral candidates conducting research on education. Fellows receive $27,500 for up to two academic years. As of 2024, the program had over 400 alumni.

=== National Academy of Education/Spencer Foundation Postdoctoral Fellowship Program ===
The Spencer Foundation and the National Academy of Education also jointly award postdoctoral fellowships to early-career scholars. The program provides $70,000 for two years to 25 fellows. As of 2025, it had more than 800 alumni.
