= International Council of Jewish Parliamentarians =

International socio-political forum

- Company type: international socio-political forum
- Founded: 2002
- Headquarters: 9a Diskin Street, 5th Floor Jerusalem, Israel 96440
- Website: http://www.icjp.net/index.htm

The International Council of Jewish Parliamentarians (ICJP) is a project supported by the World Jewish Congress. Its goal is to bring together Jewish legislators and parliamentarians from around the world to engage in a dialogue of cooperation to achieve the goals of the ICJP's Mission.

== ICJP Mission ==
The International Council of Jewish Parliamentarians seeks:

- To promote an ongoing dialogue and a sense of fraternity among Jewish legislators and ministers;
- To uphold the principles of democracy, further the cause of human rights and promote the rule of law;
- To combat racism, xenophobia, and terrorism by all means available to parliamentarians and ministers;
- To support Israel, conduct dialogue on political issues between Jewish parliamentarians and the political leadership in Israel, and contribute toward the creation of enduring peace in the Middle East;
- To ensure the welfare, both material and spiritual, of Jews and Jewish communities worldwide.
- To create international cooperation on projects relevant to ICJP members.

== History ==
The desire to establish the International Council of Jewish Parliamentarians (ICJP) arose from a series of successful bi-annual meetings held in Israel since 1988, of Jewish government ministers and members of parliaments from around the world. These conferences established a global network of relationships among Jewish officials and parliamentarians and enabled greater knowledge and understanding of the challenges facing Jewish parliamentarians and communities in Israel and the Diaspora. The growth from an initial 20 participants in 1988 to over 80 in 2002 reflects the interest in engaging in a global dialogue on the future of the Jewish people and the State of Israel. These earlier sessions were organized and supported by the Knesset, Ministry of Foreign Affairs, and the World Jewish Congress.

At its January 2005 meeting in Jerusalem, the ICJP Steering Committee adopted a number of resolutions that follow this Background. They appointed Ruth Kaplan - former Chief of Staff to four Speakers of the Knesset and an ICJP veteran - as ICJP Coordinator. In early February, meetings were held in Washington, DC, with U.S. Senators Barbara Boxer, Norm Coleman, Dianne Feinstein, Frank Lautenberg, Joseph Lieberman and Carl Levin, and with Members of Congress Gary Ackerman, Howard Berman, Susan Davis, Eliot Engel, Barney Frank, Tom Lantos, Nita Lowey, Jerrold Nadler, Jan Schakowsky, Debbie Wasserman Schultz, Allyson Schwartz, and Henry Waxman.

At the 2006 meeting of the ICJP in Jerusalem, Israel from January 7–10, the ICJP Steering Committee unanimously selected U.S. Rep. Gary L. Ackerman to serve as the organization's president. During the 2006 meeting, Israel's foreign minister, Silvan Shalom, addressed the attendees. Then-Prime Minister Ariel Sharon's planned address to the group was rendered impossible due to Sharon's hospitalization following a stroke; instead, members of the ICJP visited Sharon in the hospital and held a prayer vigil for his recovery.

== Membership ==
Membership in the ICJP is open to:

- Jewish members of national parliaments and of the European Parliament, cabinet or deputy ministers who currently hold office; and
- A permanent delegation of ten percent of the Knesset who will participate in the activities of the Council.

(Note: Where a country has no Jewish representation in its parliament, former Jewish parliamentarians may be considered by the Executive for membership, ad personam. Membership will also be open to outstanding former parliamentarians who can inspire present-day leaders as determined by the Executive.)

To participate, Members must accept the mission of the ICJP.
