= Empire State News =

News organization in New York

- Empire State News
- Type: Daily newspaper, website
- Owner(s): Statewide News Network, Inc
- Founded: 2003
- Headquarters: EmpireStateNews.Net editor =
- Website: EmpireStateNews.net

Empire State News is a news organization in New York State, which maintains a news website, 'Empire State News' newspaper and weather forecasting systems. Empire State News has operated since 2003, when production was begun by Statewide News Network, Inc, a three-decade-old news broadcasting company for the Hudson Valley. It was sold in late 2015.
