= Metro New York =

More on Free Newspapers Online

- Type: Daily newspaper
- Publisher: Ed Abrams
- Managing editor: Morgan Rousseau
- Founded: May 5, 2004; 21 years ago
- Ceased publication: January 6, 2020; 6 years ago
- Language: English
- City: New York City
- Country: United States
- Sister newspapers: Metro Philadelphia
- Website: www.metro.us/news/local-news/new-york/

Metro New York was a free daily newspaper in New York City.

== Background ==
It was launched on May 5, 2004 by Metro International.

Metro New York was primarily distributed by "hawkers" paid to station themselves in areas with high pedestrian traffic, who offered the free paper to anyone who passed by. In 2009, Metro International sold its US papers to a former executive.

In January 2020, the assets of Metro New York and Metro Philadelphia were acquired by Schneps Media, owner of amNewYork. The New York papers were combined as amNew York Metro, shortened to Schneps' original amNew York in 2025.

== See also ==
- List of New York City newspapers and magazines
