= The Brooklyn Paper =

American newspaper

Brooklyn Paper
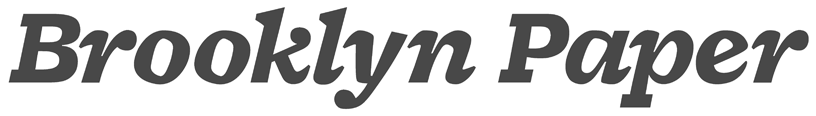
- Type: Weekly newspaper
- Owner: Schneps Media
- Founder: Ed Weintrob
- Founded: 1978; 47 years ago
- Language: English
- Headquarters: One MetroTech Center
- City: Brooklyn
- Country: United States
- Website: brooklynpaper.com

Brooklyn Paper is a weekly newspaper that covers news related exclusively to the New York City borough of Brooklyn. Brooklyn Paper covers news and cultural events throughout the borough, using different mastheads for neighborhoods such as Park Slope, Brooklyn Heights, Bay Ridge, etc. In addition to news coverage, the paper also publishes a weekly entertainment guide entitled GO Brooklyn. It was founded in 1978.

Though the various print editions are published once a week, Brooklyn Paper's website is updated every weekday with stories.

In January 2007, the company name "Brooklyn Papers" was renamed "The Brooklyn Paper", and the local editions (The Park Slope Paper, The Bay Ridge Paper) were all renamed The Brooklyn Paper with the local edition printed under the title. The local editions currently include The Bay Ridge Courier (covering Bay Ridge, Dyker Heights, and Bensonhurst), Brooklyn Paper, (covering Brooklyn Heights, Downtown, Cobble Hill, and all of northern Brooklyn), The Park Slope Courier (covering Park Slope, Crown Heights, Carroll Gardens, and Gowanus), Bay News (covering Coney Island, Gravesend, and Brighton Beach), and The Mill-Marine Courier (covering Mill Basin, Marine Park, Sheepshead Bay, and Canarsie).

The paper was bought by News Corporation in 2009. News Corporation had previously acquired the Courier-Life chain of Brooklyn papers in 2006. In 2014, News Corp sold its Community Newspaper Group to former company executive Les Goodstein and his wife Jennifer.

Schneps Media acquired Brooklyn Paper in September 2018 after purchasing its parent company, Community News Group.
