= New York Guardian =

American monthly newspaper (1991–1994)

- Categories: News
- Frequency: monthly
- Founder: Herbert London
- First issue: 1991; 35 years ago
- Final issue: 1994
- Company: Free Press Corp.
- Based in: Great Neck, New York
- Language: English
- ISSN: 1060-0167
- OCLC: 24875415

The New York Guardian was a monthly periodical published by Herbert London, a professor at New York University and the 1990 Conservative Party candidate for governor of New York State. The paper's editor-in-chief was Christopher W. Ruddy.

The New York Guardian gained national attention in 1993 when it exposed the historical inaccuracy of the PBS documentary Liberators: Fighting on Two Fronts in World War II, which alleged that an all-African American Army unit liberated the Dachau and Buchenwald concentration camps near the end of World War II.

The New York Guardian ceased publication in 1994 when it was purchased by Human Events, the weekly conservative newspaper.
