= The Bronx Chronicle =

Newspaper

The Bronx Chronicle is a century old small local newspaper.

Founded in the late 19th or early 20th century, the newspaper has chronicled the history and events of the borough for generations.

Some key facts about The Bronx Chronicle:

- It is one of the oldest continuously operating newspapers in the Bronx
- The newspaper covers local news, politics, community events, and issues relevant to Bronx residents
- Its coverage area includes the entire borough of the Bronx in New York City
- The Bronx Chronicle is considered a valuable resource for researching the history and development of the Bronx over the past century

Despite its small size, The Bronx Chronicle has played an important role in the life of the borough. As a hyperlocal newspaper, it has given voice to the concerns and perspectives of Bronx residents while documenting the changes and challenges the community has faced over the decades.
