= New York Press Association =

Member organization for New York state newspapers

- Abbreviation: NYPA
- Formation: 1853
- Type: NGO
- Purpose: Journalism-related and First Amendment issues
- Headquarters: Cohoes, New York
- President: Mark Vinciguerra
- Executive director: Bryce Jacobson
- Website: nynewspapers.com

The New York Press Association (NYPA) is a member organization of newspapers in New York State.

The NYPA provides editorial assistance, advice and counsel to its 800 member newspapers, advocates for best journalism practices, provides a libel hotline for member papers, and promotes journalism education. NYPA runs an annual journalism competition and provides training at an annual conference.

NYPA is headquartered in Cohoes, New York.

== History ==
NYPA was founded September 8, 1853 when thirty-two newspapermen met in Elmira, New York for a "Convention of the Editors and Publishers of Western and Southern New York." They banded together in part because of concerns about advertising rates and their work force but the exchange of information about mutual interests was also a motivating factor. At the time, NYPA was called the "Western New York Typographical Association." John Phelps of the Mayville Sentinel was its first president. The organization was later known by two other names: the "New York State Editorial and Typographical Association" (1858), and "Editor and Publishers Association of the State of New York) (1871). It was re-named "New York Press Association" in 1874.

By 1895, NYPA had 256 members, each paying $2 a year for membership dues. During the Great Depression, Matthew Lyle Spencer, dean of Syracuse University's School of Journalism, offered NYPA office space, a manager, contest judges and convention assistance. NYPA was headquartered at Syracuse from 1937 through 1982, when it moved to Albany, New York.

In 1945, the New York Press Service was officially established as the profit-making arm of NYPA. It generates revenue, primarily through advertising sales, to support the entire operation.

== Annual meetings ==
Members of the NYPA traveled to Washington, D.C., to meet with the U.S. President Ulysses S. Grant in May 1874. On June 9, 1875, the 21st annual meeting of the NYPA was held in Elmira. About 40 members of the Alabama Press Association also attended the meeting.

On June 8, 1881, the NYPA held its 25th annual meeting in Utica, New York., with William Curtis of Harper's Weekly giving an address to 2,500 attendees. NYPA's annual meetings have featured a variety of newsmakers discussing industry issues as well as state and national politics:

Governor Franklin Roosevelt addressed the annual meeting of NYPA editors in February 1929 and outlined a plan to provide $12 million in relief to poor farmers in New York state. On Feb. 6, 1953, M.N. Taylor, a Wisconsin conservationist, told the 101st annual meeting of the NYPA in Syracuse that reforestation of 2 million acres of state land was important for the long-term production of newsprint.

In 1973, U.S. Representative Bella Abzug called for federal safeguards to protect a journalist's right to protect confidential sources. Senator Robert F. Kennedy addressed a group of NYPA editors on Feb. 12, 1968, criticizing the proliferation of governmental units and calling for more a centralized plan of attack on Hudson River pollution.

== Activities ==
Since 1930, NYPA has run a statewide "Better Newspaper Competition" awarding prizes to newspapers for journalism. The journalism competition dates back to 1875 when NYPA began offering prizes of $3 to $5 for news writing and printing.

== Leadership ==
In 1975, Ann V. Dulye of Walden, New York and co-publisher of The Stewart Citizen and Citizen-Herald of Walden, became the first woman president of NYPA. Michelle K. Rea, hired as associate director in 1992, was appointed executive director Jan. 1, 1996.
