= Matthew Lyle Spencer =

President of the University of Washington

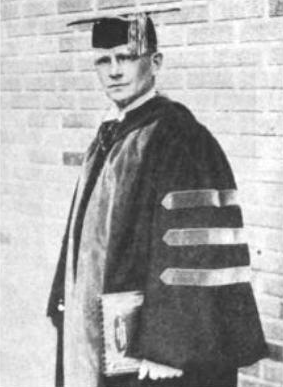
- Born: July 7, 1881; Panola County, Mississippi, US
- Died: February 10, 1969 (aged 87); Clearwater, Florida, US
- Education: Kentucky Wesleyan College; Northwestern University
- Occupation: Educator

Matthew Lyle Spencer (July 7, 1881 – February 10, 1969) was an American minister and writer. He served as the 18th president of the University of Washington from 1927 to 1933 and later as the founding dean of the School of Journalism at Syracuse University from 1934 to 1950.

== Early life and education ==
Spencer was born near Batesville, Mississippi, the eldest son of Methodist Episcopal minister Reverend Flournoy Poindexter Spencer and Alice Eleanor Manes. Alice was the daughter of Henry Manes of Thomasville, Georgia. Matthew had two sisters and one brother: Eleanor Elizabeth (1883–?), Leslie Louise (1887–?) and Flournoy Poindexter (1885–?). Spencer was able to trace his American ancestry to some 55 years before the signing of the Declaration of Independence.

In 1903, Spencer graduated from Kentucky Wesleyan College with an A.B. (bachelor's) degree. Later in 1904, he obtained his A.M. (Master's degree) from the same college. While completing these degrees, he worked as part-time instructor and later professor (1903–1904) in the college's English department. In 1905, Spencer attended Northwestern University where he received an additional A.M. degree. Between 1905–1906 and again in 1909–1910, Spencer also served as fellow of English at the University of Chicago, earning his Ph.D. from the university in 1910. Prior to that, Spencer began teaching at Wofford College (Spartanburg, South Carolina) in 1906, as an assistant professor of English. He also worked at the Huntingdon College.

== Journalism and Washington ==
Spencer left Woman's College in 1911 to assume a position as English professor at Lawrence College in Appleton, Wisconsin. He stayed at this position for seven years during which time he also served as reporter and copy reader (1913, 1917–1918) for the Milwaukee Journal.

According to Emory Magazine, "his purpose [both as writer and professor] was to write a trilogy to separate the teaching of journalism into news writings, copy and editorial writing." In 1917, shortly before leaving the college, Spencer became chief editor of the Milwaukee Journal. This position was short-lived as Spencer felt it his duty, as war raged in Europe, to enlist in the military.

During the later part of the First World War (1918), Spencer became a captain in military intelligence for the United States Army. After the war, Lyle maintained his Army ties and in 1929 was appointed lieutenant colonel, in the special reserves He retained this rank until his retirement some ten years later.

In September 1919, Spencer resumed teaching, accepting a position as Director of the School of Journalism at the University of Washington. On January 11, 1926, Spencer was appointed dean of the school of journalism. In September the following year, Spencer accepted the position as president of the university. According to Charles M. Gates' book The First Century at the University of Washington, the political climate at the university (under Governor Hartley's administration) became so intolerable that the then president of the university, Dr. Suzzallo was forced to resign.

The presidency was then passed to Spencer, former dean of the university's college of journalism. Faculty and staff favored the new administration since more attention was given to salary increases and promotion opportunities. Spencer supported the efforts of the administration in providing a higher level in scholarship and standards. During his inaugural address he stated, "When the Universities in any country cease to be in close touch with the social life and institutions of the people ... their days of influence are numbered."

Spencer also advocated admission requirements be stiffened and that elective and so-called "sop-courses" be dropped. He felt arts and sciences should be the heart of higher education thereby greatly diminishing the role of technical and vocational training. After a short time, opposition to Spencer's programs began to grow. One of the first groups to express dissatisfaction was the Seattle High School Teacher's League. The league felt that the university and especially the president were being biased toward the graduate school, and were preventing new students from enrolling. The university's policy, according to League members, served to be discriminatory toward students who possessed merely average ability.

In 1932, a new governor was elected by the state of Washington. 1932 also marked an important change in university administrative autonomy and student accessibility. With the new direction of state government and university procedure, it became evident that there must be changes on the highest level of the university's administration. For these, and other reasons, Spencer tendered his resignation as president of the university on January 27, 1933, and his resignation became effective June 30, 1933.

== Syracuse University ==
After leaving the University of Washington in April 1933, Spencer traveled to the University of Chicago where he taught one year. In 1934, Spencer organized the school of journalism at Syracuse University, believing journalism was a specialized form of English deserving its own curriculum. That same year, he was appointed the university's first dean of the school of journalism. During this period Spencer wrote several major journalism textbooks, including News Writing and Editorial Writing.

Later, while on leave, Spencer traveled to Egypt in 1936 and 1945 and became visiting professor at the American University in Cairo. During his first five-month visit he planned the curriculum and founded the university's department of journalism.

During the war years, Spencer established the War Service College at Syracuse. The college provided hard core courses in math, science and language for men about to enter military service. It was also during this time that he was instrumental in establishing propaganda as a specialized journalistic form. He also served as the founding chair of the board of directors of the Syracuse University Press.

Spencer served as the founding dean of the School of Journalism at Syracuse University from 1934 to 1950. Before retiring from Syracuse in June 1951 as dean emeritus, Spencer had also lectured at Oriental Culture Summer College in Tokyo (1940), received the Columbia Scholastic Press Association's Gold Medal (1946), and Syracuse University's Distinguished Service Medal. He also possessed honorary doctorates from Northwestern University (1928), the College of Puget Sound (1932), Kentucky Wesleyan College (1942), and Syracuse University (1951).

== Personal life ==
While teaching at Wofford, Spencer met and married Ms. Lois Hill, but the marriage lasted only 10 years. The couple had one son, Lyle M. Spencer, who was born in Atlanta. Lyle M. Spencer was founder of Science Research Associates, served as the director of IBM, and later established the Spencer Foundation. In 1920, Spencer married his second wife, Helen McNaughton, and the couple would eventually have three children: Orton, Judson, and Helen.

Upon retirement, Spencer moved to Clearwater, Florida where died at the age of 87 on February 10, 1969. He was interred in New York.

== Legacy ==
During his professional career, Spencer authored several academic works including: William Gilmore Simms's The Yemassee (editor), Corpus Christi Pageants in England, Practical English Punctuation, News Writing, and Editorial Writing. Spencer was also active in various societies including: the American Association of Schools and Journalism Departments, Tau Kappa Alpha, Sigma Delta Chi, Alpha Gamma Delta, Phi Beta Kappa (April 24, 1931), Rotary Club, Sons of the American Revolution, Wisconsin Academy of Science, Arts and Letters, and Fellow of the Royal Society of Arts (Eng.).

An endowed professorship was established at Syracuse in his honor in 1971. Basil Leon Walters was the first M. Lyle Spencer Visiting Professor of Journalism, Syracuse University. Chuck Stone also was a recipient in 1975.
