= Metro (Philadelphia newspaper) =

Daily newspaper in Philadelphia, US

- Type: Daily free newspaper
- Owner: O’Rourke Media Group
- Founded: January 24, 2000
- Language: English
- Headquarters: Philadelphia, Pennsylvania, U.S.
- Website: metrophiladelphia.com

Metro is a free daily newspaper in Philadelphia which began publishing on January 24, 2000. Originally published by Metro International, it was the first Metro edition published in North America and the ninth edition since the first in Stockholm in 1995. Since July 2025, it has been owned and published by O’Rourke Media Group.

== Overview ==
Lawyers representing the publishers of The Philadelphia Inquirer, Philadelphia Daily News, USA Today and The New York Times filed an action in Federal Court three days before Metro's first publication to block local transit authority SEPTA from giving what they considered to be a competitive advantage to Metro.

The front page of the first Philadelphia edition of Metro.

SEPTA signed a five-year contract with TPI Metro. Part of the contract allows SEPTA to produce one page in each edition; however, aside from that page SEPTA has no control over any other aspect of the paper. The contract calls for Metro to pay $45,000 a month to SEPTA, which they stopped paying in March 2003, claiming SEPTA failed to live up to the terms of the contract. Despite lawsuits and counter-suits, in 2004 TPI Metro PA and SEPTA signed a three-year contract which increased payments to $65,000 a month.

In 2009, Metro International sold its US papers to its former CEO, Pelle Toernberg, who formed Metro US to oversee the papers.

In March 2019, the paper eliminated three of its four general news staffers. The paper was bought by Schneps Media from Metro US in December 2019. The paper's entire staff was laid off during the sale. In July 2025, Schneps sold Metro Philadelphia, Metro.us and Philly Sports Network to O’Rourke Media Group.
