= The Death of Poe =

- Directed by: Mark Redfield
- Written by: Stuart Voytilla; Mark Redfield
- Produced by: Stuart Voytilla; Mark Redfield
- Starring: Mark Redfield; Kevin G. Shinnick; Jennifer Rouse; Tony Tsendeas
- Music by: Jennifer Rouse
- Distributed by: Alpha Video (DVD)
- Release date: November 2004
- Running time: 80 minutes
- Country: United States
- Language: English

The Death of Poe is a 2006 independent film that reenacts the events of the disappearance and unsolved death of the American author Edgar Allan Poe. The film is shot mostly in black-and-white with occasional color sequences.

== Plot ==
After a textual montage summarizing Edgar Allan Poe's life, the film begins in late September 1849 with Poe awakening from a hallucination where he is buried alive. He prepares to take a trip to New York City via a ferry steamboat from Richmond, Virginia, to Baltimore, and from there, another ferry to New York City itself. He discusses his plans to marry his childhood sweetheart Sarah Elmira Royster with a stranger taking the same steamboat, who suggests that he meet with a few potential investors for his planned magazine The Stylus. Though Poe had intended only to pass through Baltimore, he agrees to meet the investors who, one by one, turn down his request for funding.

Poe is depicted as having some type of memory loss, which is first evident when he offers to pay his boat fare twice after forgetting he had already paid. In Baltimore, he more than once forgets the arrangements he has made at his hotel as his stay in the city is extended. One night, he chooses to dine in a local tavern rather than at the hotel. There, he meets an old friend from his days at West Point. In desperation, he asks his former classmate and the classmate's companion for money to help start a magazine, saying proudly he has already raised $1,000. Poe leaves the tavern to retrieve his prospectus for the magazine. His classmate follows him and beats him up to steal the $1,000 he had collected.

An injured and delirious Poe is then found by organizers of a cooping ring. The author, along with several others, are forced to multiple polling locations around Baltimore to place multiple votes for the candidate for mayor. A couple of victims of the scam die amidst the brutality of their captors.

Afterwards, Poe is released and he eventually collapses in the street and is found by a local tavern owner. The man calls for Poe's uncle Henry Herring and Dr. Joseph Snodgrass. The men discuss what to do with the incoherent, half-conscious Poe. Snodgrass assumes he is drunk and suggests they let him sleep it off - a theory the film seems to dispute by showing him early in the film declining offered alcohol several times. Herring becomes more concerned and demands Poe be taken to Washington College Hospital, despite the expense.

At the hospital, Dr. John Moran tends to Poe, unable to accurately determine his situation or the cause of his failing health, or how he received his injuries. He muses to his wife, Mrs. Moran, that he does not want to be known as the physician who killed Edgar Allan Poe. Over the next three days, the bedridden Poe is kept in seclusion in a private room as Moran denies Poe visitors, including his Baltimore cousin Nielson Poe, who becomes convinced that his cousin is about to die. Poe ultimately does die after one final hallucination or perhaps a flashback where he sees his dead wife Virginia Clemm.

== Cast ==
| Actor | Role |
|---|---|
| Mark Redfield | Edgar Allan Poe |
| Kevin G. Shinnick | Dr. John Moran |
| Jennifer Rouse | Mrs. Moran |
| Tony Tsendeas | Neilson Poe |
| Kimberly Hannold | Virginia Clemm |
| Wayne Shipley | Henry Herring |
| Jonathon Ruckman | Joseph Walker |
| George Stover | Thadeus & Zacharlah Wainwright |
| J.R. Lyston | The Irishman |
| Kurt Bouschell | The Proud Father |
| Sandra Lynn O'Brien | The Talented Daughter |
| Chuck Richards | The Stranger in Richmond |
| Deborah L. Murphy | Maria Clemm |
| Dave Ellis | Cornelius Ryan |
| Jimmyo Burril | Election Gang Leader |
| Thomas E. Cole | Caleb |
| Erik DeVito | Horace |
| Pete Karas | The Landlady's Son |
| Andrew Ready | Griswold's Clerk |
| Tom Brandau | Rufus Griswold |
| Holly Huff | Elmira Shelton |
| T.B. Griffith | Steamboat Captain |
| Douglas Spence | A Porter |
| Shawn Jones | Election Gang Member |
| Johanna Supensky | The Landlady |
| Josh Metz | Election Gang Member |
| Samuel DiBlasi Jr. | Cooping Victim |
| Richard Arnold | Cooping Victim |
| Michael H. Alban | Barman |
| Sean Paul Murphy | Dr. Snodgrass |
| Jay Carroll | Surgeon's Assistant |
| Rick Kelton | Mr. Charles |
| Dick Svehla | Drunk |
| Gary Svehla | Drunk |
| Leo Dymowski | Drunk |
| Charlie Wittig | Drunk |
| Barry Murphy | Temperance Preacher |
| Mallory Herberger | Nurse |
| William Blewwett | Doctor |
| George Sherry | Doctor |

== Production ==
The film was shot on location in Baltimore and Virginia, and at the studios of Redfield Arts . Principal photography took place in June and July 2005.

== Distribution ==
The Death of Poe had its world premiere at the Festival of Fantastic Films in Manchester, United Kingdom on September 30, 2006. The U.S. premiere was at Baltimore's Charles Theatre on October 11, 2006.

The film was released on DVD in the United States by Alpha Video on December 5, 2006. Alpha's release also included two rare early films based on Poe's work: The Avenging Conscience (1914) (D.W. Griffiths' silent film adaptation of "The Tell-Tale Heart"), The Raven (1915), and additional bonus material.

The film was also screened at the Fargo Film Festival in Fargo, North Dakota on March 11, 2007.

== Reception ==
British film journalist M.J. Simpson described the film as "an impressive and imaginative piece of independent film-making, available at a ridiculously low price and thoroughly worth the time, effort and cash of anyone who has ever enjoyed reading (or watching films based on) the words of Edgar Allan Poe." DVDTOWN.com managing editor James Plath wrote that Redfield's portrayal "really does bring the character to life," however the production "doesn't have the level of acting or script sophistication to make it play in Peoria . . . or anywhere else where Poe isn't revered." This sentiment was echoed by DVD Pub Review, who stated that "Mark Redfield has a lot of talent, but it seems that he tries too hard to do too much." Both Plath and DVD Pub Review lauded the extensive bonus material of the DVD release.

== See also ==
- Edgar Allan Poe in popular culture
- Edgar Allan Poe in television and film
