= Death of Edgar Allan Poe =

Sudden and mysterious death of the American author

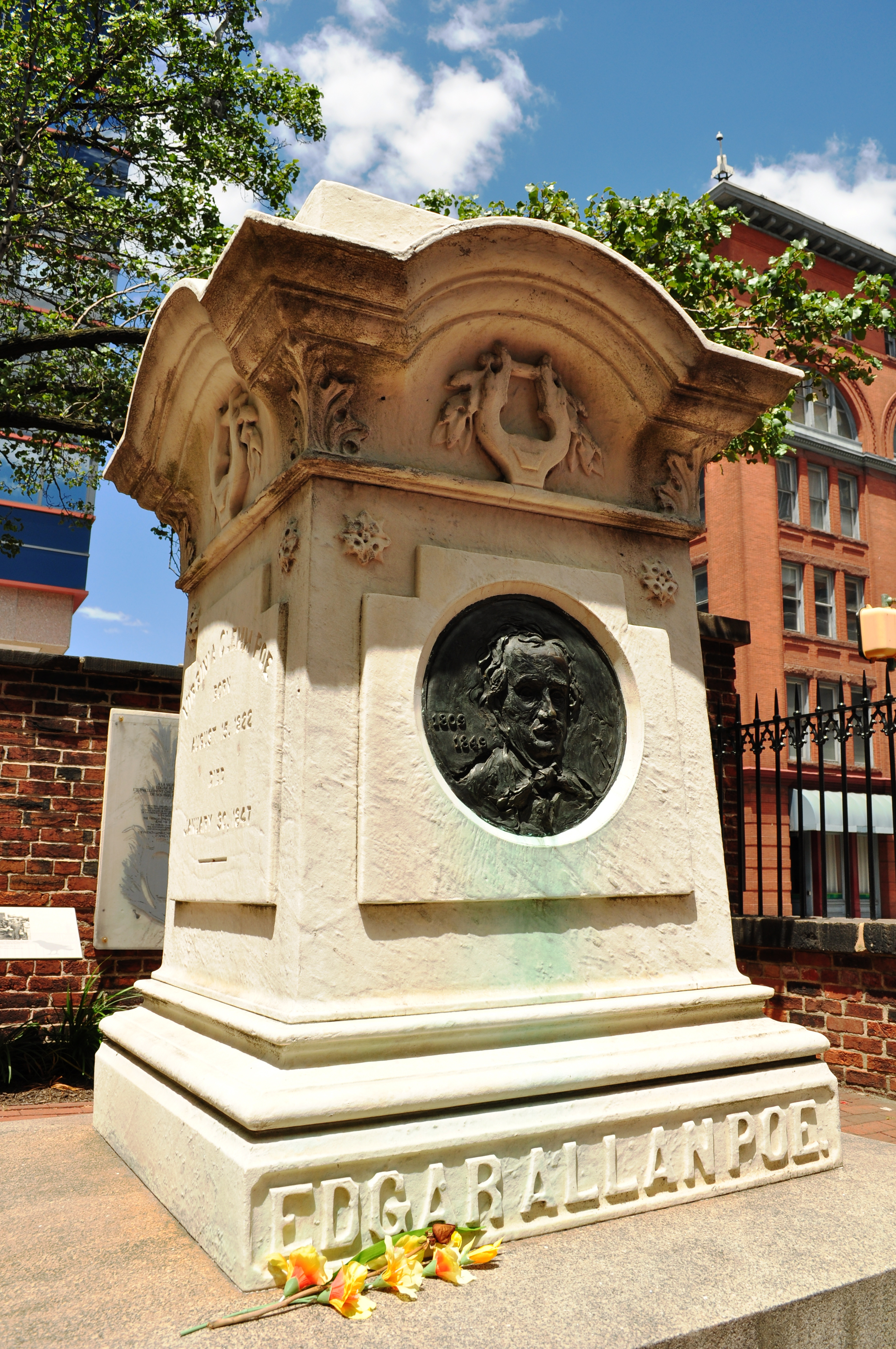
- Poe's body lies beneath this monument in Baltimore. The death of the author is shrouded in mystery and debate.
- Date: October 7, 1849; 177 years ago
- Location: Baltimore, Maryland, U.S.
- Cause: Undetermined

The death of American author Edgar Allan Poe on October 7, 1849, has remained mysterious in regard to both the cause of death and the circumstances leading to it. Poe was found delirious and disheveled at a tavern in Baltimore, Maryland, on October 3. He sought the help of magazine editor Joseph E. Snodgrass and was taken to the Washington College Hospital, where he was treated for his apparent alcohol intoxication. Poe had no visitors in the hospital and gave no account of how he came to be in his condition before dying on October 7 at age 40.

Theories as to what caused Poe's death include murder, suicide, cholera, hypoglycemia, rabies, syphilis, tuberculosis, influenza, brain tumor and that Poe was a victim of cooping, a type of election fraud common during the period. Evidence of the influence of alcohol is strongly disputed.

Much of the extant information about the last few days of Poe's life comes from his attending physician, John Joseph Moran, though Moran's credibility is questionable. Poe was buried at the First Presbyterian Church Burying Ground, after a small funeral, but in 1875 his remains were moved to a new grave with a larger monument. The newer monument also marks the final burial place of Poe's wife, Virginia, and his mother-in-law, Maria.

After Poe's death, Rufus Wilmot Griswold wrote his obituary under the pseudonym "Ludwig". Griswold, who became the literary executor of Poe's estate, was actually a rival of Poe and later published his first full biography, depicting the author as a depraved, drunk, drug-addled madman. Much of the evidence for this image of Poe is believed to have been fabricated by Griswold, and although friends of Poe denounced it, this interpretation had a lasting impact.

== Chronology ==
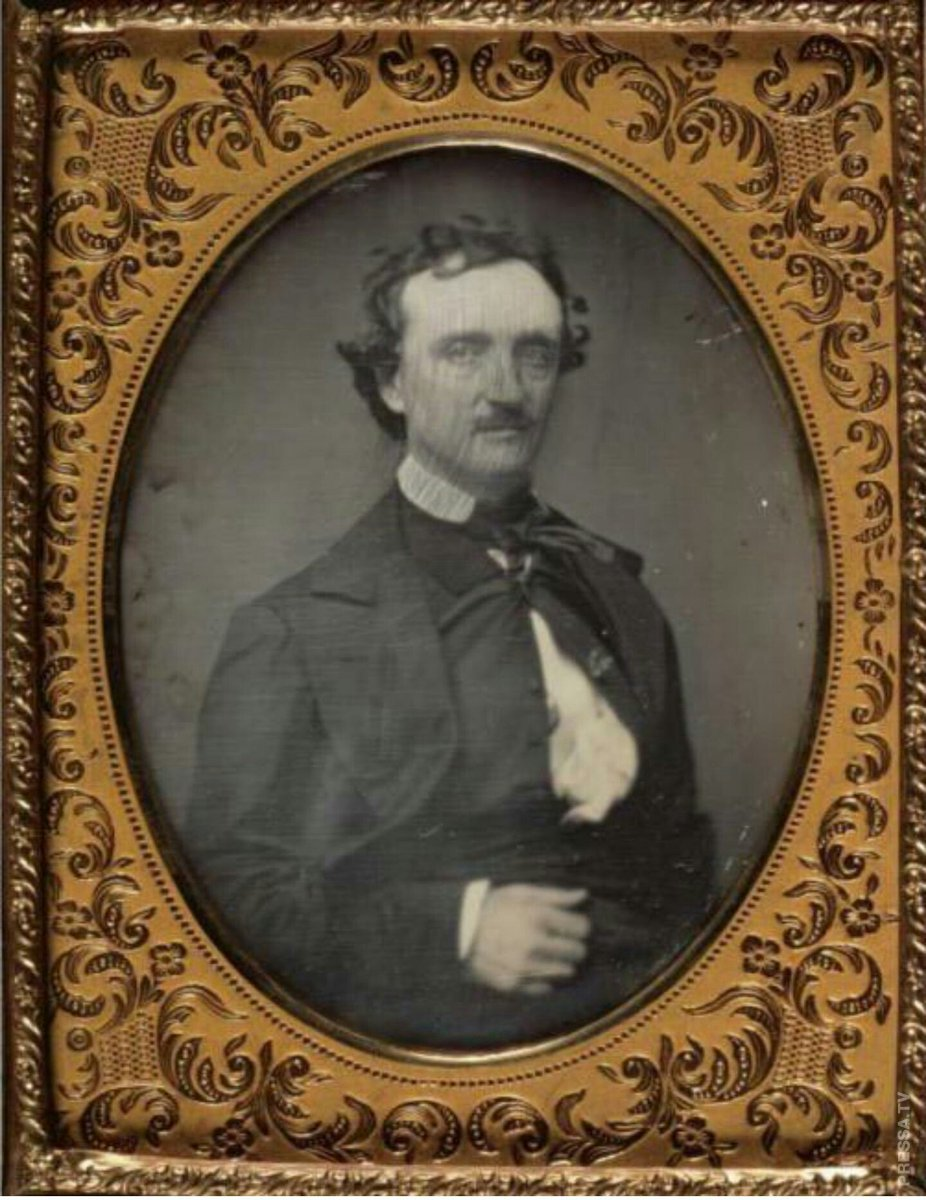
Poe daguerreotype by William Abbott Pratt in September 1849, a month before his death

Between July and September 1849, Edgar Allan Poe stayed in Richmond, Virginia, to explore a possible magazine venture. He arrived there still suffering the effects of what he described as a cholera attack accompanied by hallucinations, insistent that he had not been drinking. Poe recuperated and gave well-received lectures and readings to pay his expenses. He departed on September 27 for his home in New York City, having decided to relocate for an editor job and to remarry.

No reliable evidence exists about Poe's whereabouts until a week later on October 3, when he was found delirious in Baltimore, Maryland, at Ryan's Tavern (sometimes referred to as Gunner's Hall). A printer named Joseph W. Walker sent a letter requesting help to Joseph E. Snodgrass, an acquaintance of Poe. His letter reads as follows:

Dear Sir—There is a gentleman, rather the worse for wear, at Ryan's 4th ward polls, who goes under the cognomen of Edgar A. Poe, and who appears in great distress, & he says he is acquainted with you, and I assure you, he is in need of immediate assistance. Yours, in haste, Jos. W. Walker

Snodgrass later claimed the note said that Poe was "in a state of beastly intoxication."

Snodgrass's first-hand account describes Poe's appearance as "repulsive", with unkempt hair, a haggard, unwashed face and "lusterless and vacant" eyes. His clothing, Snodgrass said, which included a dirty shirt but no vest and unpolished shoes, was worn and did not fit well. John Joseph Moran, who was Poe's attending physician, gives his own detailed account of Poe's appearance that day: "a stained faded, old bombazine coat, pantaloons of a similar character, a pair of worn-out shoes run down at the heels, and an old straw hat". Poe was never coherent long enough to explain how he came to be in this condition, and it is believed the clothes he was wearing were not his own, not least because wearing shabby clothes was out of character for him.

Moran cared for Poe at Washington College Hospital on Broadway and Fayette Street. He was denied any visitors and was confined in a prison-like room with barred windows in a section of the building reserved for drunk people.

Poe is said to have repeatedly called out the name "Reynolds" on the night before his death, though no one has ever been able to identify the person to whom he referred. One possibility is that he was recalling an encounter with Jeremiah N. Reynolds, a newspaper editor and explorer who may have inspired the novel The Narrative of Arthur Gordon Pym of Nantucket. Another possibility is that Poe was referencing Henry R. Reynolds, one of the judges overseeing the Fourth Ward Polls at Ryan's Tavern, who may have met Poe on Election Day. Poe may have instead been calling for "Herring", as the author had an uncle-in-law in Baltimore named Henry Herring. In later testimonies, Moran avoided reference to Reynolds but mentioned a visit by a "Misses Herring". He also claimed he attempted to cheer up Poe during one of the few times he was awake. When Moran told his patient that he would soon be enjoying the company of friends, Poe allegedly replied that, "the best thing his friend could do would be to blow out his brains with a pistol".

In Poe's distressed state, he made reference to a wife in Richmond. He may have been delusional, thinking that his wife, Virginia, was still alive, or he may have been referring to Sarah Elmira Royster, to whom he had recently proposed. Poe did not know what had happened to his trunk of belongings which, it transpired, had been left behind at the Swan Tavern in Richmond. Moran reported that Poe's final words were, "Lord, help my poor soul" before dying on October 7, 1849.

=== Credibility of Moran ===
Because Poe did not have visitors, Moran was probably the only person to see the author in his last days. Even so, his credibility has been questioned repeatedly, if not considered altogether untrustworthy. Throughout the years after Poe's death, his story changed as he wrote and lectured on the topic. Moran claimed (in 1875 and again in 1885, for example) that he had immediately contacted Poe's aunt and mother-in-law, Maria Clemm, to let her know about Poe's death; in fact, he wrote to her only after she had requested it on November 9, more than a full month after the event. He also claimed that Poe had said, quite poetically, as he prepared to draw his last breath: "The arched heavens encompass me, and God has his decree legibly written upon the frontlets of every created human being, and demons incarnate, their goal will be the seething waves of blank despair." The editor of the New York Herald, which published this version of Moran's story, admitted, "We cannot imagine Poe, even if delirious, constructing [such sentences]." Poe biographer William Bittner attributes Moran's claim to a convention of assigning pious last words to console mourners.

Moran's accounts even altered dates. At different points, he claimed Poe was brought to the hospital on October 3 at 5 p.m., on October 6 at 9 a.m. or on October 7 (the day he died) at "10 o'clock in the afternoon". For each published account, he claimed to have the hospital records as reference. A search for hospital records a century later, specifically an official death certificate, found nothing. Some critics say Moran's inconsistencies and errors were due only to a lapse of memory, an innocent desire to romanticize, or even to senility. At the time he wrote and published his last account in 1885, Moran was aged 65.

== Cause of death ==
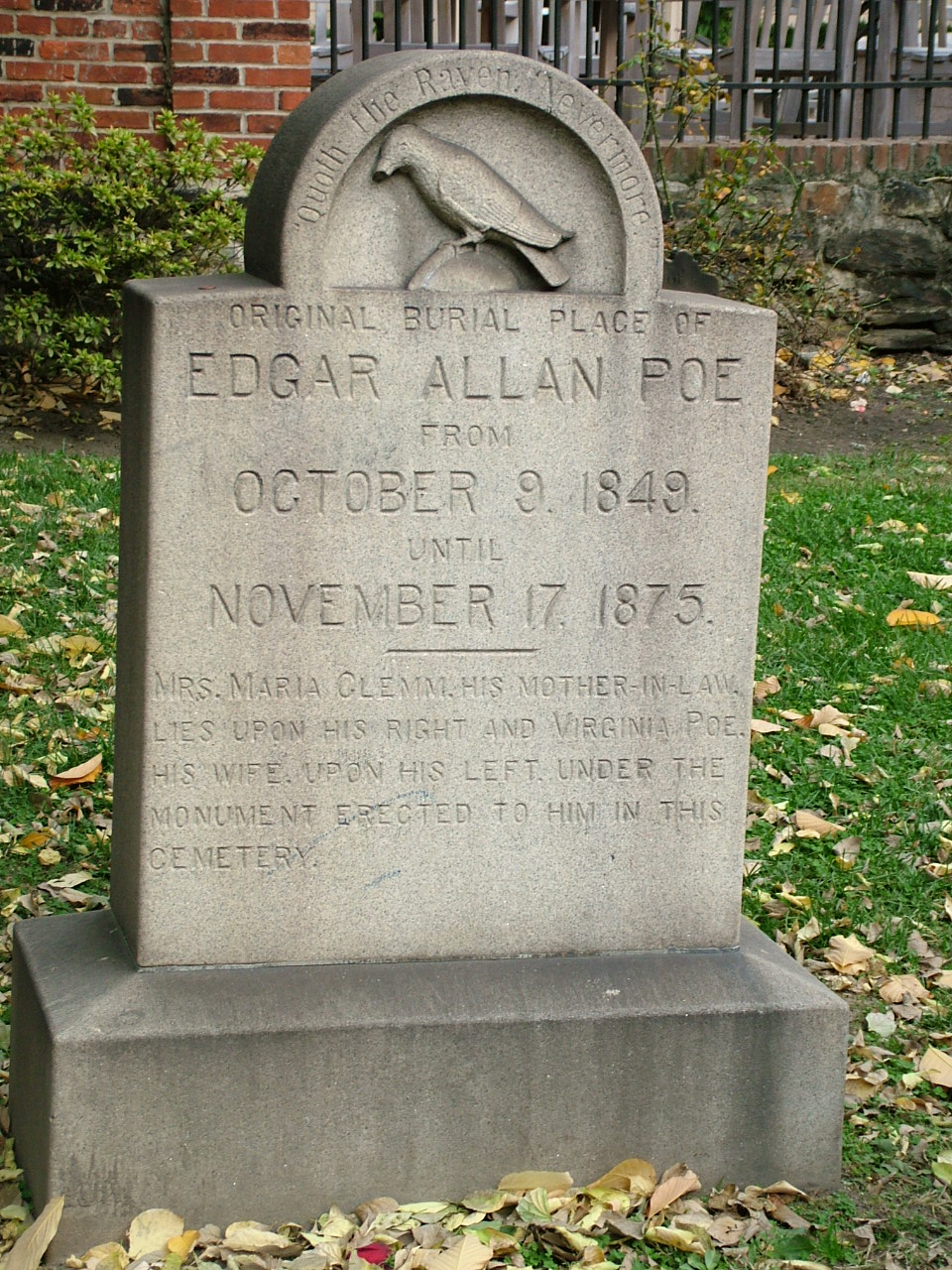
Poe was originally buried in a family plot in the First Presbyterian Church's Western Burying Ground, without a headstone. A later stone marks the original burial plot today (39.28972°N 76.62333°W).

All medical records and documents, including Poe's death certificate, have been lost, if they ever existed. The precise cause of death is disputed, but many theories exist. Many biographers have addressed the issue and reached different conclusions, ranging from Jeffrey Meyers' assertion that it was hypoglycemia to John Evangelist Walsh's conspiratorial murder plot theory.

It has also been suggested that Poe's death might have resulted from suicide related to depression. In 1848, Poe nearly died from an overdose of laudanum, readily available as a tranquilizer and painkiller. Though it is unclear if this was a true suicide attempt or just a miscalculation on Poe's part, it did not lead to his death a year later. In 2020, a psychological analysis of Poe's language by Ryan L. Boyd theorized that he was suffering from a major depressive episode near the end of his life and that suicide could not be ruled out. However, the evidence for suicide was not consistently present in Poe's professional writings, leading the researchers to conclude that depression may have played a role in his death, but suicide seemed unlikely.

Snodgrass was convinced that Poe died from alcoholism and did a great deal to popularize this idea. He was a supporter of the temperance movement and found Poe a useful example in his temperance work. However, Snodgrass's writings on the topic have proved to be untrustworthy. Moran contradicted Snodgrass by stating in his own 1885 account that Poe did not die under the effect of any intoxicant, writing that Poe "had not the slightest odor of liquor upon his breath or person". Even so, some newspapers at the time reported Poe's death as "congestion of the brain" or "cerebral inflammation", euphemisms for deaths from disgraceful causes such as alcoholism. In a study of Poe from 1923, a psychologist suggested that Poe had dipsomania.

Poe's characterization as an uncontrollable alcoholic is disputed. His drinking companion for a time, Thomas Mayne Reid, admitted that the two engaged in wild "frolics" but that Poe "never went beyond the innocent mirth in which we all indulge ... While acknowledging this as one of Poe's failings, I can speak truly of its not being habitual". Some believe Poe had a severe susceptibility to alcohol and became drunk after one glass of wine. He only drank during difficult periods of his life and sometimes went several months at a time without alcohol. Adding further confusion about the frequency of Poe's use of alcohol was his membership in the Sons of Temperance at the time of his death. William Glenn, who administered Poe's pledge, wrote years later that the temperance community had no reason to believe Poe had violated his pledge while in Richmond. Suggestions of a drug overdose have also been proven to be untrue, though it is still often reported. Thomas Dunn English, an admitted enemy of Poe and a trained physician, insisted that Poe was not a drug user. He wrote: "Had Poe the opium habit when I knew him (before 1846) I should both as a physician and a man of observation, have discovered it during his frequent visits to my rooms, my visits at his house, and our meetings elsewhere – I saw no signs of it and believe the charge to be a baseless slander."

Numerous other causes of death have been proposed over the years, including several forms of rare brain disease or a brain tumor, diabetes, various types of enzyme deficiency, syphilis, apoplexy, delirium tremens, epilepsy and meningeal inflammation. A doctor named John W. Francis examined Poe in May 1848 and believed he had heart disease, which Poe later denied. A 2006 test of a sample of Poe's hair provides evidence against the possibility of lead poisoning, mercury poisoning or similar toxic heavy-metal exposures. Cholera has also been suggested. Poe had passed through Philadelphia in early 1849 during a cholera epidemic. He got sick during his time in the city and wrote a letter to his aunt, Maria Clemm, saying that he may "have had the cholera, or spasms quite as bad".

Because Poe was found on the day of an election, it was suggested as early as 1872 that he was the victim of a method of election fraud called cooping. Victims of cooping were abducted off the street by local "election gangs", imprisoned in a small room called "the coop", drugged or forced with alcohol or beatings to get them to comply. They were then used as pawns to vote for a political party at multiple locations. Often their clothing would be changed and/or they would be given disguises such as wigs, fake beards or mustaches to fool election officials and vote multiple times. Cooping, which would also explain the dirty and disheveled clothes and shoes that Poe was wearing when he was found, had become the standard explanation for his death in most of his biographies for several decades, though his social status in Baltimore may have made him too recognizable for this scam to have worked.

In an analysis published in the Maryland Medical Journal in 1996 by cardiologist R. Michael Benitez, it was suggested Poe's death most likely resulted from rabies, possibly contracted from one of his pets. Signs that pointed to this conclusion included delirium and Poe having difficulty drinking water when hospitalized (likely hydrophobia, or fear of water, a common symptom of rabies), as well as the fact that rabies victims can have the virus for up to a year after contracting it.

== Funeral ==
Poe's funeral was a simple one, held at 4 p.m. on Monday, October 8, 1849, in Baltimore. Few people attended the ceremony. Poe's uncle-in-law, Henry Herring, provided a simple mahogany coffin, and a cousin, Neilson Poe, supplied the hearse. Moran's wife made his shroud. The funeral was presided over by the Reverend W. T. D. Clemm, cousin of Poe's late wife Virginia. Also in attendance were Snodgrass; Baltimore lawyer and former University of Virginia classmate Zaccheus Collins Lee; Poe's first cousin Elizabeth Herring and her husband; and former schoolmaster Joseph Clarke. The entire ceremony lasted only three minutes in the cold, damp weather. Reverend Clemm decided not to bother with a sermon because the crowd was too small. Sexton George W. Spence wrote of the weather: "It was a dark and gloomy day, not raining but just kind of raw and threatening." Poe was buried at the back of Westminster Hall and Burying Ground, in a cheap coffin that lacked handles, a nameplate, cloth lining or a cushion for his head.

On October 10, 2009, Poe received a second funeral in Baltimore. Actors portrayed Poe's contemporaries and other long-dead writers and artists. Each paid their respects and read eulogies adapted from their writings about Poe. The funeral included a replica of Poe's casket and wax cadaver.

== Burial and reburial ==
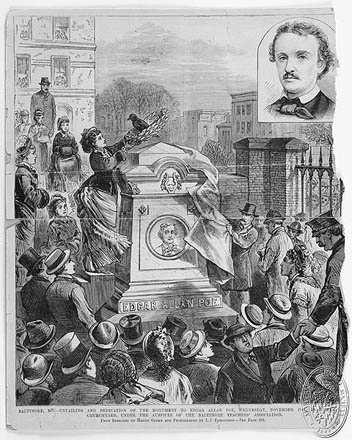
On November 17, 1875, Poe was reburied with a new monument. The remains of his wife, Virginia, and mother-in-law, Maria, are also interred there.

Poe was initially buried in an unmarked grave towards the rear corner of the churchyard near his grandfather, David Poe, Sr. A headstone of white Italian marble had been paid for by Neilson Poe who hired Hugh Sisson, whose work was found throughout the city. A train derailed and plowed through the stone mason's yard, pulverizing the headstone before it could be delivered. Lacking funds for a new monument, Poe's grave was marked with a sandstone block that read simply "No. 80".

In 1873, Southern poet Paul Hamilton Hayne visited Poe's grave and published a newspaper article decrying its poor condition and suggesting a better monument. Sara Sigourney Rice, a Baltimore schoolteacher, took advantage of renewed interest in Poe's grave site and personally solicited for funds. Many in Baltimore and throughout the United States contributed. The new monument was designed by Baltimore architect George A. Frederick and again made by stone mason Sisson. It included a medallion image of Poe by Baltimore artist Adalbert J. Volck. The total cost of the monument amounted to slightly more than $1,500 ($63,300 in current value, as of March 2026).

Poe was reburied on October 1, 1875, at a new location close to the front of Westminster church. A celebration was held at the dedication of the new tomb on November 17. Poe's original burial spot was marked with a large stone donated by Orin C. Painter, though it was originally placed in the wrong spot. Attendees included Neilson Poe, who gave a speech and called his cousin "one of the best hearted men that ever lived", as well as Snodgrass, Nathan C. Brooks and John Hill Hewitt. Though several leading poets were invited to the ceremony, Walt Whitman was the only one to attend. Alfred Tennyson contributed a poem which was read at the ceremony:

Fate that once denied him,
And envy that once decried him,
And malice that belied him,
Now cenotaph his fame.

Probably unknown to the reburial crew, the headstones on all the graves, previously facing to the east, had been turned to face the burying ground's West Gate in 1864. The crew digging up Poe's remains had difficulty finding the right body: they first exhumed a 19-year-old Maryland militiaman, Philip Mosher, Jr. When they correctly located Poe, they opened his coffin and one witness noted: "The skull was in excellent condition—the shape of the forehead, one of Poe's striking features, was easily discerned."

A few years later, the remains of Poe's wife, Virginia, were moved to this spot as well. The cemetery in which she lay had been destroyed in 1875, and she had no kin to claim her remains. William Gill, an early Poe biographer, gathered her bones and stored them in a box he hid under his bed. Virginia's remains were finally buried with her husband's on January 19, 1885, the 76th anniversary of her husband's birth and nearly ten years after his present monument was erected. Spence, the man who served as sexton during Poe's original burial as well as his exhumation and reburial, attended the rites that brought his body to rest with Virginia and her mother, Maria Clemm.

== Posthumous character assassination ==
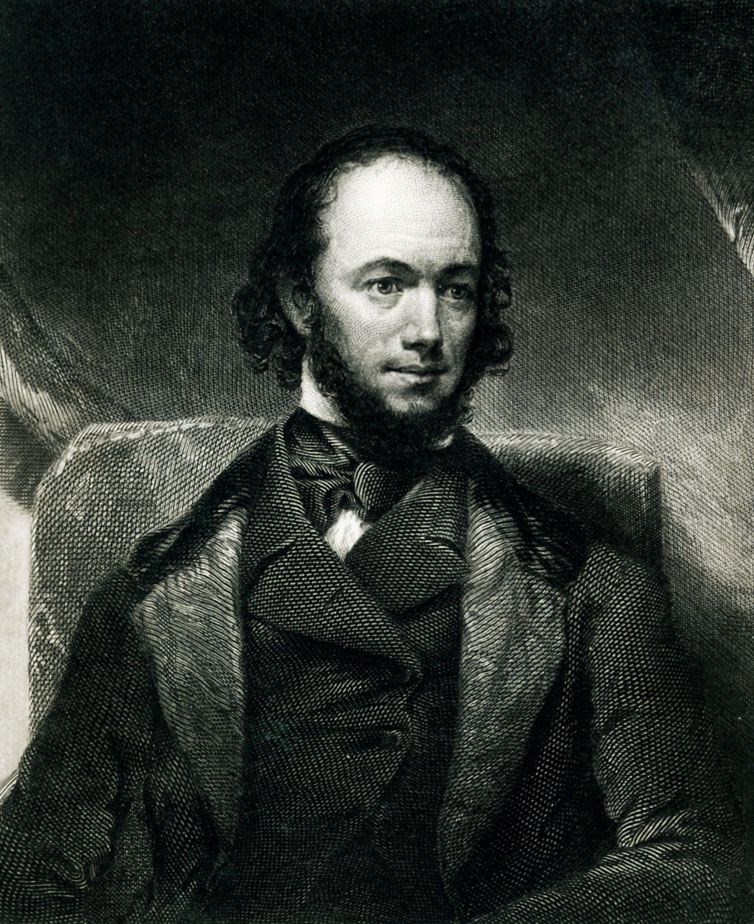
Rufus Wilmot Griswold, Poe's literary executor, wrote the most famous obituary of Poe as well as his first full biography.

On October 9, the day after Poe's burial, an obituary appeared in the New York Tribune. Signed only "Ludwig", the obituary floridly alternated between praising the dead author's abilities and eloquence and damning his temperament and ambition. "Ludwig" said that "literary art lost one of its most brilliant, but erratic stars" but also claimed Poe was known for walking the streets in delirium, muttering to himself and that he was excessively arrogant, assumed all men were villains and was quick to anger. "Ludwig" was later revealed to be Rufus Wilmot Griswold, a former colleague and acquaintance of Poe. Even while Poe was still alive, Griswold had engaged in character assassination. Much of his characterization in the obituary was lifted almost verbatim from that of the fictitious Francis Vivian in The Caxtons by Edward Bulwer-Lytton. The obituary quickly became the standard characterization of Poe.

Griswold also claimed that Poe had asked him to be his literary executor. He had served as an agent for several American authors, but it is unclear whether Poe appointed him to be the executor or whether Griswold became executor through a trick or a mistake by Poe's aunt and mother-in-law, Maria. In 1850 he presented, in collaboration with James Russell Lowell and Nathaniel Parker Willis, a collection of Poe's work that included a biographical article titled "Memoir of the Author", in which Poe was depicted as a depraved, drunk, drug-addled madman. Many parts of it were believed to have been fabricated by Griswold, and it was denounced by those who had known Poe, including Sarah Helen Whitman, Charles Frederick Briggs and George Rex Graham. John Neal, who was the first to praise Poe in 1829, wrote in 1850 that Griswold is a "Rhadamanthus, who is not to be bilked of his fee, a thimble-full of newspaper notoriety". Griswold's account became popularly accepted, in part because it was the only full biography available and was widely reprinted. It also remained popular because many readers assumed that Poe was similar to his fictional characters or were thrilled at the thought of reading the works of an "evil" man.

A more accurate biography of Poe did not appear until John Henry Ingram's of 1875. Even so, historians continued to use Griswold's depiction as a model for their own biographies of Poe, including W. H. Davenport in 1880, Thomas R. Slicer in 1909 and Augustus Hopkins Strong in 1916. Many used Poe as a cautionary tale against alcohol and drugs. In 1941, Arthur Hobson Quinn presented evidence that Griswold had forged and re-written a number of Poe's letters that were included in his "Memoir of the Author". By then, Griswold's depiction of Poe was entrenched in the mind of the public, both in the U.S. and around the world, and this distorted image of the author has become part of the Poe legend despite attempts to dispel it.

== See also ==
- Edgar Allan Poe in popular culture (the circumstances of his death have inspired several fictional retellings and investigations)
- List of unsolved deaths
- Poe Toaster, a mysterious figure who visited Poe's grave every year
