= Amasa Converse =

American minister and newspaper editor (1795–1872)

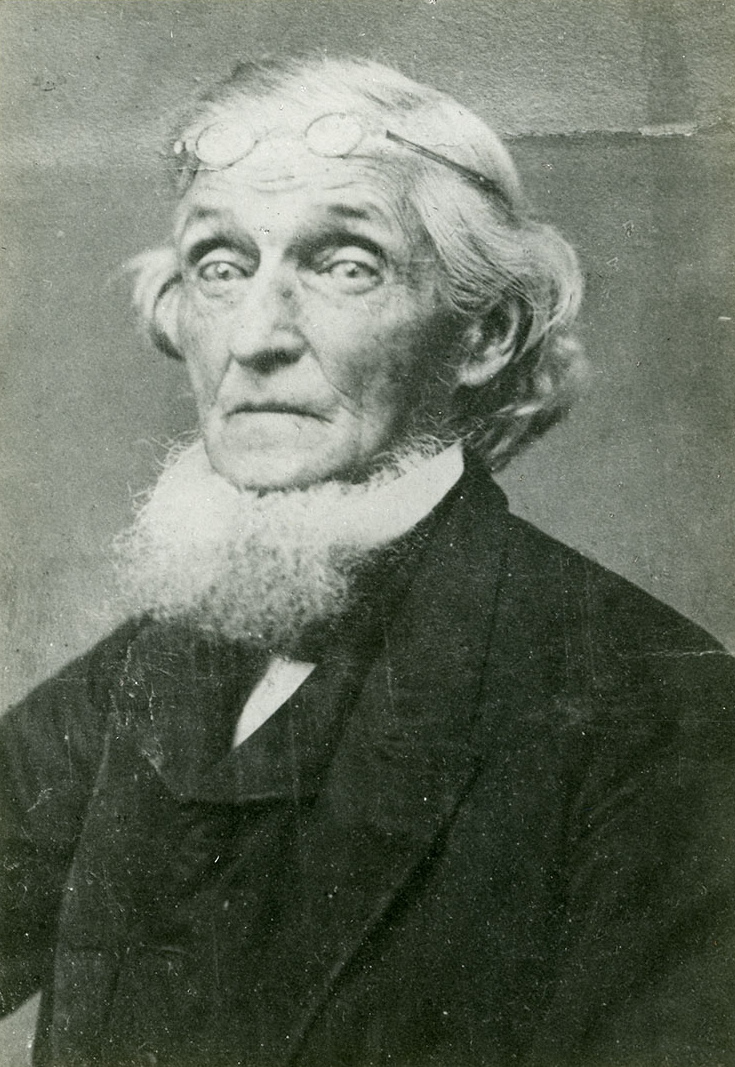
- Converse in the 1870s
- Born: August 21, 1795; Lyme, New Hampshire, U.S.
- Died: December 9, 1872 (aged 77); Louisville, Kentucky, U.S.
- Education: Dartmouth College; Princeton Theological Seminary

Amasa Converse (August 21, 1795 – December 9, 1872) was an American Presbyterian minister and senior editor of the Christian Observer. Converse performed the marriage of Edgar Allan Poe to Poe's teenage cousin, Virginia Clemm Poe.

== Early life ==
Converse was born on August 21, 1795, in Lyme, New Hampshire. He attended Phillips Academy and Dartmouth College before entering Princeton Theological Seminary.

== Newspaper publication ==
In 1827, Converse left his evangelical work in Virginia to become editor of the Richmond Visitor and Telegraph. In 1836, he performed the marriage of Edgar Allan Poe and Virginia Clemm. "Late on the evening of May 16, Mr. Cleland, with Mrs. Clemm, Poe and Virginia, left Mrs. Yarrington's, and, walking quietly up Main street to the corner of Seventh, were married in Mr. Converse's own parlor." Converse noted the bride "looked very young". She was 13.

In 1838, he took over the Philadelphia Observer. The publications were merged in Philadelphia and became the Christian Observer. After the death of Amasa Converse in 1872, his son F. Bartlett Converse became editor of the Christian Observer.

=== Civil War ===
Converse's Southern sympathies and such disagreements over the Civil War brought the publication office South to Richmond, and later it was in Louisville. Converse was arrested by President Abraham Lincoln's administration and freed after three months. Converse said the South had been guilty of idleness and intemperance, had been a proud and ungrateful people, and that these sins were partially responsible for the war.

== Death ==
On December 9, 1872, Converse died in Louisville.

== Works cited ==
- Shankman, Arnold (1974). "Converse,The Christian Observer and Civil War Censorship". Journal of Presbyterian History. 52 (3): 227–244. ISSN 0022-3883. JSTOR 23327636.
