= The Caxtons =

Book by Edward Bulwer-Lytton

The Caxtons: A Family Picture
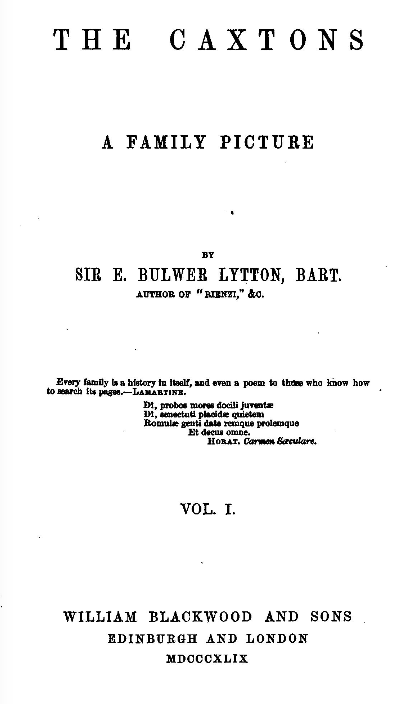
- First edition title page to Vol. I.
- Language: English
- Publisher: William Blackwood and Sons (Edinburgh)
- Publication date: 1849

The Caxtons: A Family Picture is an 1849 Victorian novel by Edward Bulwer-Lytton that was popular in its time.

The book was first serialized anonymously in Blackwood's Magazine from April 1848 to October 1849, and first published in novel form (in three volumes) in Britain in 1849. In the United States, it was serialized in Harper's Magazine (1850–53) and Littell's Living Age (1850-52).

The novel was "instantly popular" in Britain and also sold 35,000 copies within three years of its release in the United States.

== Plot ==
A synopsis of the plot from a 1910 reference work states:

The Caxtons are Austin Caxton, a scholar engaged on a great work, "The History of Human Error;" his wife Kitty, much his junior; his brother Roland, the Captain, who has served in the Napoleonic campaigns; the two children of the latter, Herbert and Blanche; and Austin's son, Pisistratus, who tells the story. The quiet country life of the family of Austin Caxton is interrupted by a visit to London. There Pisistratus, who has had a good school education, though he has not yet entered the university, is offered the position of secretary to Mr. Trevanion, a leader in Parliament. Lady Ellinor, Mr. Trevanion's wife, was loved as a girl by Roland and Austin Caxton; but she had passed them both by to make a marriage better suited to an ambitious woman. By a freak of fate Pisistratus now falls in love with her daughter Fannie; and when he finds that his suit is hopeless, he gives up his position under Mr. Trevanion, and enters Cambridge University, where his college course is soon closed by the financial troubles of his father. A further outline of this story would give no idea of its charm. The mutual affection of the Caxtons is finely indicated, and the gradations of light and shade make a beautiful picture. Never before had Bulwer written with so light a touch and so gentle a humor, and this novel has been called the most brilliant and attractive of productions. His gentle satire of certain phrases of political life was founded, doubtless, on actual experience.

The Caxtons are asserted to have descended from William Caxton, the first English printer. In the latter part of the novel, two characters emigrate to Australia, and emigration is positively depicted as a chance for redemption.

Pisistratus Caxton also serves as the nominal narrator of My Novel (1853) and What Will He Do With It? (1858).

== Legacy ==
From the time of its release, comparisons of the work to Tristram Shandy were frequent, with a few commentators suggesting the borrowing was perhaps too much, but the former work can be ultimately seen more generally as an inspiration than a source text.

The Stanford Companion to Victorian Fiction (1989) states that the "domestic milieu and easy-going narrative manner" of The Caxtons stands in contrast to the author's prior melodramatic works, and "marks a turning point in Bulwer-Lytton's career, and in Victorian fiction generally."

The description of Edgar Allan Poe in Rufus Wilmot Griswold's negative and much-republished 1849 obituary of Poe is in part a lengthy quote of the description of the character Frances Vivian in The Caxtons. The passage was marked with quotes in the original obituary, but the quotes were omitted when later republished.
