= Virginia Eliza Clemm Poe =

Wife of Edgar Allan Poe (1822–1847)

Virginia Poe
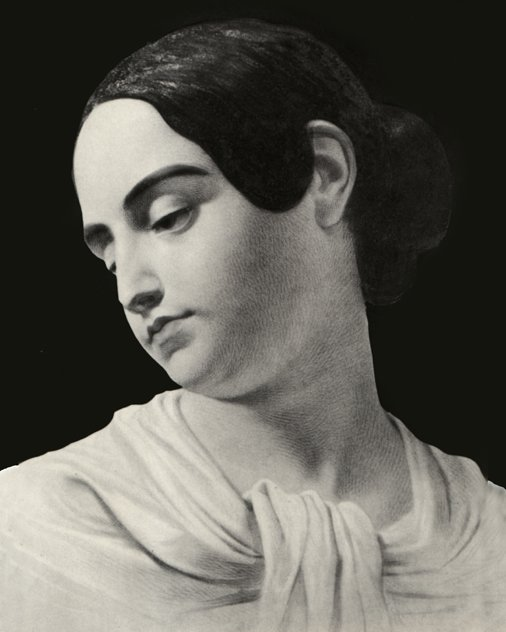
- Virginia Poe, as painted after her death
- Born: Virginia Eliza Clemm; August 15, 1822; Baltimore, Maryland, U.S.
- Died: January 30, 1847 (aged 24); Bronx County, New York, U.S.
- Cause of death: Tuberculosis
- Resting place: Westminster Hall and Burying Ground, Baltimore, Maryland, U.S.
- Spouse: Edgar Allan Poe (m. 1836)

Virginia Eliza Poe (née Clemm; August 15, 1822 – January 30, 1847) was the wife of the American writer Edgar Allan Poe. The couple were first cousins and publicly married when Virginia Clemm was 13 and Poe was 27. Biographers disagree as to the nature of the couple's relationship. Though their marriage was loving, some biographers suggest they viewed one another more like a brother and sister. In January 1842, she contracted tuberculosis, which grew worse over five years until she died of the disease at the age of 24 in the family's cottage, at that time outside New York City.

Along with other family members, Virginia Clemm and Edgar Allan Poe lived together off and on for several years before their marriage. The couple often moved to accommodate Poe's employment, living intermittently in Baltimore, Philadelphia, and New York. A few years after their wedding, Poe was involved in a substantial scandal involving Frances Sargent Osgood and Elizabeth F. Ellet. Rumors about amorous improprieties on her husband's part affected Virginia Poe so much that on her deathbed she claimed that Ellet had murdered her. After her death, her body was eventually placed under the same memorial marker as her husband's in Westminster Hall and Burying Ground in Baltimore. Only one image of Virginia Eliza Clemm Poe has been authenticated: a watercolor portrait painted several hours after her death.

The illness and eventual death of his wife had a substantial effect on Edgar Allan Poe, who became despondent and turned to alcohol to cope. Her struggles with illness and death are believed to have affected his poetry and prose, where dying young women appear as a frequent motif, as in "Annabel Lee", "The Raven", and "Ligeia".

== Biography ==
=== Early life ===
Virginia Eliza Clemm was born in 1822 and named after an older sister who had died at age two only ten days earlier. Her father William Clemm, Jr. was a hardware merchant in Baltimore. He had married Maria Poe, Virginia's mother, on July 12, 1817, after the death of his first wife, Maria's first cousin Harriet. Clemm had five children from his previous marriage and went on to have three more with Maria. After his death in 1826, he left very little to the family and relatives offered no financial support because they had opposed the marriage. Maria supported the family by sewing and taking in boarders, aided with an annual $240 pension granted to her mother Elizabeth Cairnes, who was paralyzed and bedridden. Elizabeth received this pension on behalf of her late husband, "General" David Poe, a former quartermaster in Maryland who had loaned money to the state.

Edgar Allan Poe first met his cousin Virginia in August 1829, four months after his discharge from the Army. She was seven at the time. In 1832, the family—made up of Elizabeth, Maria, Virginia, and Virginia's brother Henry—was able to use Elizabeth's pension to rent a home at what was then 3 North Amity Street in Baltimore. Poe's older brother William Henry Leonard Poe, who had been living with the family, had recently died on August 1, 1831. Poe joined the household in 1833 and was soon smitten by a neighbor named Mary Devereaux. The young Virginia served as a messenger between the two, at one point retrieving a lock of Devereaux's hair to give to Poe. Elizabeth Cairnes Poe died on July 7, 1835, effectively ending the family's income and making their financial situation even more difficult. Henry died around this time, sometime before 1836, leaving Virginia as Maria Clemm's only surviving child.

In August 1835, Poe left the destitute family behind and moved to Richmond, Virginia, to take a job at the Southern Literary Messenger. While Poe was away from Baltimore, another cousin, Neilson Poe, the husband of Virginia's half-sister Josephine Clemm, heard that Edgar was considering marrying Virginia. Neilson offered to take her in and have her educated in an attempt to prevent the girl's marriage to Edgar at such a young age, though suggesting that the option could be reconsidered later. Edgar called Neilson, the owner of a newspaper in Baltimore, his "bitterest enemy," and interpreted his cousin's actions as an attempt at breaking his connection with Virginia. On August 29, 1835, Edgar wrote an emotional letter to Maria, declaring that he was "blinded with tears while writing", and pleading that she allow Virginia to make her own decision. Encouraged by his employment at the Southern Literary Messenger, Poe offered to provide financially for Maria, Virginia, and Henry if they moved to Richmond.

=== Marriage ===
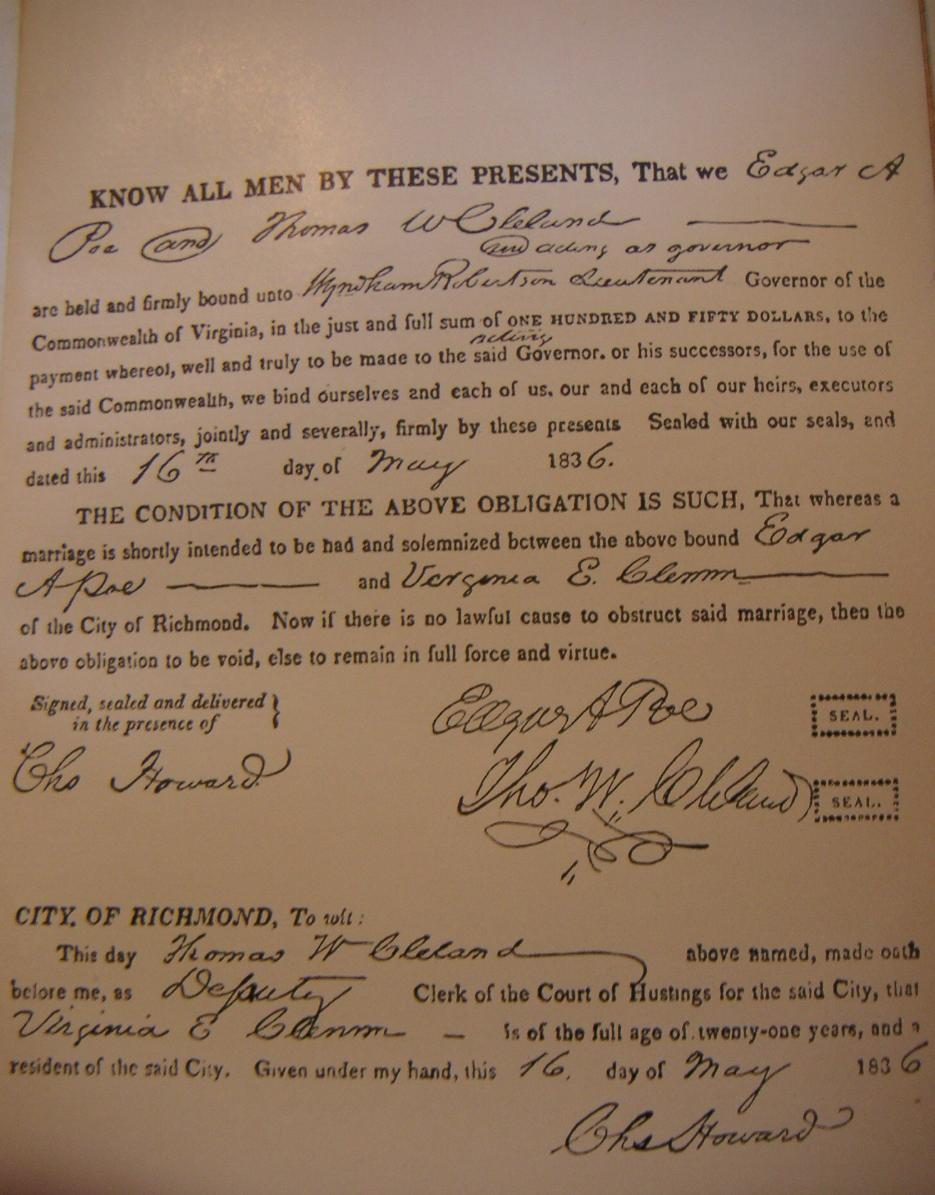
Virginia and Edgar's marriage certificate

Marriage plans were confirmed and Poe returned to Baltimore to file for a marriage license on September 22, 1835. The couple might have been quietly married as well, though accounts are unclear. Their only public ceremony was in Richmond on May 16, 1836, when they were married by a Presbyterian minister named Rev. Amasa Converse. Poe was 27 and Virginia was 13, though her age was listed as 21. Due to Virginia's young age, Poe needed her father's permission to marry her; since he was dead, it is likely that her age was listed as 21 so she could marry without her dead father's consent. This marriage bond was filed in Richmond and included an affidavit from Thomas W. Cleland confirming the bride's alleged age. The ceremony was held in the evening at the home of Mrs. James Yarrington, the owner of the boarding house in which Poe, Virginia, and Virginia's mother Maria Clemm were staying. Yarrington helped Maria Clemm bake the wedding cake and prepared a wedding meal. The couple then had a short honeymoon in Petersburg, Virginia.

Debate has centered on how unusual this pairing was based on the couple's age and blood relationship. Noted Poe biographer Arthur Hobson Quinn argues it was not particularly unusual, nor was Poe's nicknaming his wife "Sissy" or "Sis". Another Poe biographer, Kenneth Silverman, contends that though their first-cousin marriage was not unusual, her young age was. It has been suggested that Clemm and Poe had a relationship more like that between brother and sister than between husband and wife. Biographer Arthur Hobson Quinn disagreed with this view, citing a fervent love letter to argue that Poe "loved his little cousin not only with the affection of a brother, but also with the passionate devotion of a lover and prospective husband." Some scholars, including Marie Bonaparte, have read many of Poe's works as autobiographical and have concluded that Virginia died a virgin. It has been speculated that she and her husband never consummated their marriage, although no evidence is given. This interpretation often assumes that Virginia is represented by the title character in the poem "Annabel Lee": a "maiden... by the name of Annabel Lee". Poe biographer Joseph Wood Krutch suggests that Poe did not need women "in the way that normal men need them", but only as a source of inspiration and care, and that Poe was never interested in women sexually. Friends of Poe suggested that the couple did not share a bed for at least the first two years of their marriage but that, from the time she turned 16, they had a "normal" married life until the onset of her illness.

Virginia and Poe were by all accounts a happy and devoted couple. Poe's one-time employer George Rex Graham wrote of their relationship: "His love for his wife was a sort of rapturous worship of the spirit of beauty." Poe once wrote to a friend, "I see no one among the living as beautiful as my little wife." She, in turn, by many contemporary accounts, nearly idolized her husband. She often sat close to him while he wrote, kept his pens in order, and folded and addressed his manuscripts. She showed her love for Poe in an acrostic poem she composed when she was 23, dated February 14, 1846:

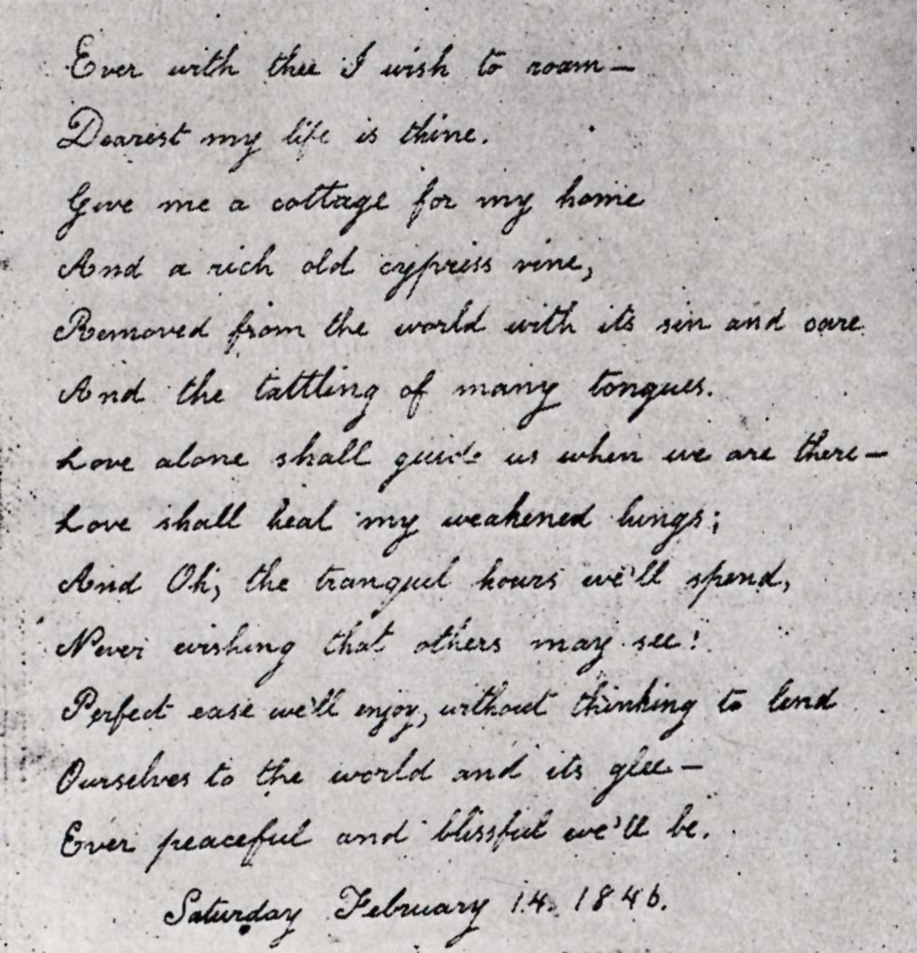
Virginia's handwritten Valentine poem to her husband

Ever with thee I wish to roam —
Dearest my life is thine.
Give me a cottage for my home
And a rich old cypress vine,
Removed from the world with its sin and care
And the tattling of many tongues.
Love alone shall guide us when we are there —
Love shall heal my weakened lungs;
And Oh, the tranquil hours we'll spend,
Never wishing that others may see!
Perfect ease we'll enjoy, without thinking to lend
Ourselves to the world and its glee —
Ever peaceful and blissful we'll be.

=== Osgood/Ellet scandal ===
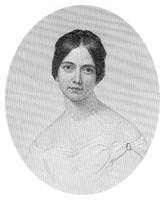
Frances Sargent Osgood

The "tattling of many tongues" in Virginia's Valentine poem was a reference to actual incidents. In 1845, Poe had begun a flirtation with Frances Sargent Osgood, a married 34-year-old poet. Virginia was aware of the friendship and might even have encouraged it. She often invited Osgood to visit them at home, believing that the older woman had a "restraining" effect on Poe, who had made a promise to "give up the use of stimulants" and was never drunk in Osgood's presence.

At the same time, another poet, Elizabeth F. Ellet, became enamored of Poe and jealous of Osgood. Though, in a letter to Sarah Helen Whitman, Poe called her love for him "loathsome" and wrote that he "could do nothing but repel [it] with scorn", he printed many of her poems to him in the Broadway Journal while he was its editor. Ellet was known for being meddlesome and vindictive, and, while visiting the Poe household in late January 1846, she saw one of Osgood's personal letters to Poe. According to Ellet, Virginia pointed out "fearful paragraphs" in Osgood's letter. Ellet contacted Osgood and suggested she should beware of her indiscretions and asked Poe to return her letters, motivated either by jealousy or by a desire to cause scandal. Osgood then sent Margaret Fuller and Anne Lynch Botta to ask Poe on her behalf to return the letters. Angered by their interference, Poe called them "Busy-bodies" and said that Ellet had better "look after her own letters", suggesting indiscretion on her part. He then gathered up these letters from Ellet and left them at her house.

Though these letters had already been returned to her, Ellet asked her brother "to demand of me the letters". Her brother, Colonel William Lummis, did not believe that Poe had already returned them and threatened to kill him. In order to defend himself, Poe requested a pistol from Thomas Dunn English. English, Poe's friend and a minor writer who was also a trained doctor and lawyer, likewise did not believe that Poe had already returned the letters and even questioned their existence. The easiest way out of the predicament, he said, "was a retraction of unfounded charges". Angered at being called a liar, Poe pushed English into a fistfight. Poe later claimed he was triumphant in the fight, though English claimed otherwise, and Poe's face was badly cut by one of English's rings. In Poe's version, he said, "I gave E. a flogging which he will remember to the day of his death." Either way, the fight further sparked gossip over the Osgood affair.

Osgood's husband stepped in and threatened to sue Ellet unless she formally apologized for her insinuations. She retracted her statements in a letter to Osgood saying, "The letter shown me by Mrs Poe must have been a forgery" created by Poe himself. She put all the blame on Poe, suggesting the incident was because Poe was "intemperate and subject to acts of lunacy". Ellet spread the rumor of Poe's insanity, which was taken up by other enemies of Poe and reported in newspapers. The St. Louis Reveille reported: "A rumor is in circulation in New York, to the effect that Mr. Edgar A. Poe, the poet and author, has been deranged, and his friends are about to place him under the charge of Dr. Brigham of the Insane Retreat at Utica." The scandal eventually died down only when Osgood reunited with her husband. Virginia, however, had been very affected by the whole affair. She had received anonymous letters about her husband's alleged indiscretions as early as July 1845. It is presumed that Ellet was involved with these letters, and they so disturbed Virginia that she allegedly declared on her deathbed that "Mrs. E. had been [her] murderer."

=== Illness ===
By this time, Virginia had developed tuberculosis, first seen sometime in the middle of January 1842. While singing and playing the piano, Virginia began to bleed from the mouth, though Poe said that she merely "ruptured a blood-vessel". Her health declined and she became an invalid, which drove Poe into a deep depression, especially as she occasionally showed signs of improvement. In a letter to a friend, Poe described his resulting mental state: "Each time I felt all the agonies of her death—and at each accession of the disorder I loved her more dearly & clung to her life with more desperate pertinacity. But I am constitutionally sensitive—nervous in a very unusual degree. I became insane, with long intervals of horrible sanity."

Virginia's condition might have been what prompted the Poe family to move, in the hopes of finding a healthier environment for her. They moved several times within Philadelphia in the early 1840s and their last home in that city is now preserved as the Edgar Allan Poe National Historic Site in Spring Garden. In this home, Virginia was well enough to tend the flower garden and entertain visitors by playing the harp or the piano and singing. The family then moved to New York sometime in early April 1844, traveling by train and steamboat. Virginia waited onboard the ship while her husband secured space at a boarding house on Greenwich Street. By early 1846, family friend Elizabeth Oakes Smith said that Virginia admitted, "I know I shall die soon; I know I can't get well; but I want to be as happy as possible, and make Edgar happy." She promised her husband that after her death she would be his guardian angel.

=== Move to Fordham ===
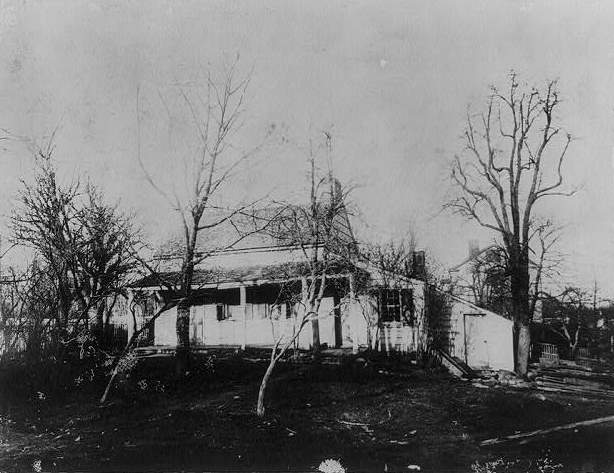
Virginia Poe endured the latter part of her illness at this cottage in the Bronx, New York, shown here in 1900.

In May 1846, the family (Poe, Virginia, and her mother, Maria) moved to a small cottage in Fordham, about fourteen miles outside the city, a home which is still standing today. In what is the only surviving letter from Poe to Virginia, dated June 12, 1846, he urged her to remain optimistic: "Keep up your heart in all hopelessness, and trust yet a little longer." Of his recent loss of the Broadway Journal, the only magazine Poe ever owned, he said, "I should have lost my courage but for you—my darling little wife you are my greatest and only stimulus now to battle with this uncongenial, unsatisfactory and ungrateful life." But by November of that year, Virginia's condition was hopeless. Her symptoms included irregular appetite, flushed cheeks, unstable pulse, night sweats, high fever, sudden chills, shortness of breath, chest pains, coughing and spitting up blood.

Nathaniel Parker Willis, a friend of Poe's and an influential editor, published an announcement on December 30, 1846, requesting help for the family, though his facts were not entirely correct:

Illness of Edgar A. Poe. —We regret to learn that this gentleman and his wife are both dangerously ill with the consumption, and that the hand of misfortune lies heavily on their temporal affairs. We are sorry to mention the fact that they are so far reduced as to be barely able to obtain the necessaries of life. That is, indeed, a hard lot, and we do hope that the friends and admirers of Mr. Poe will come promptly to his assistance in his bitterest hour of need.

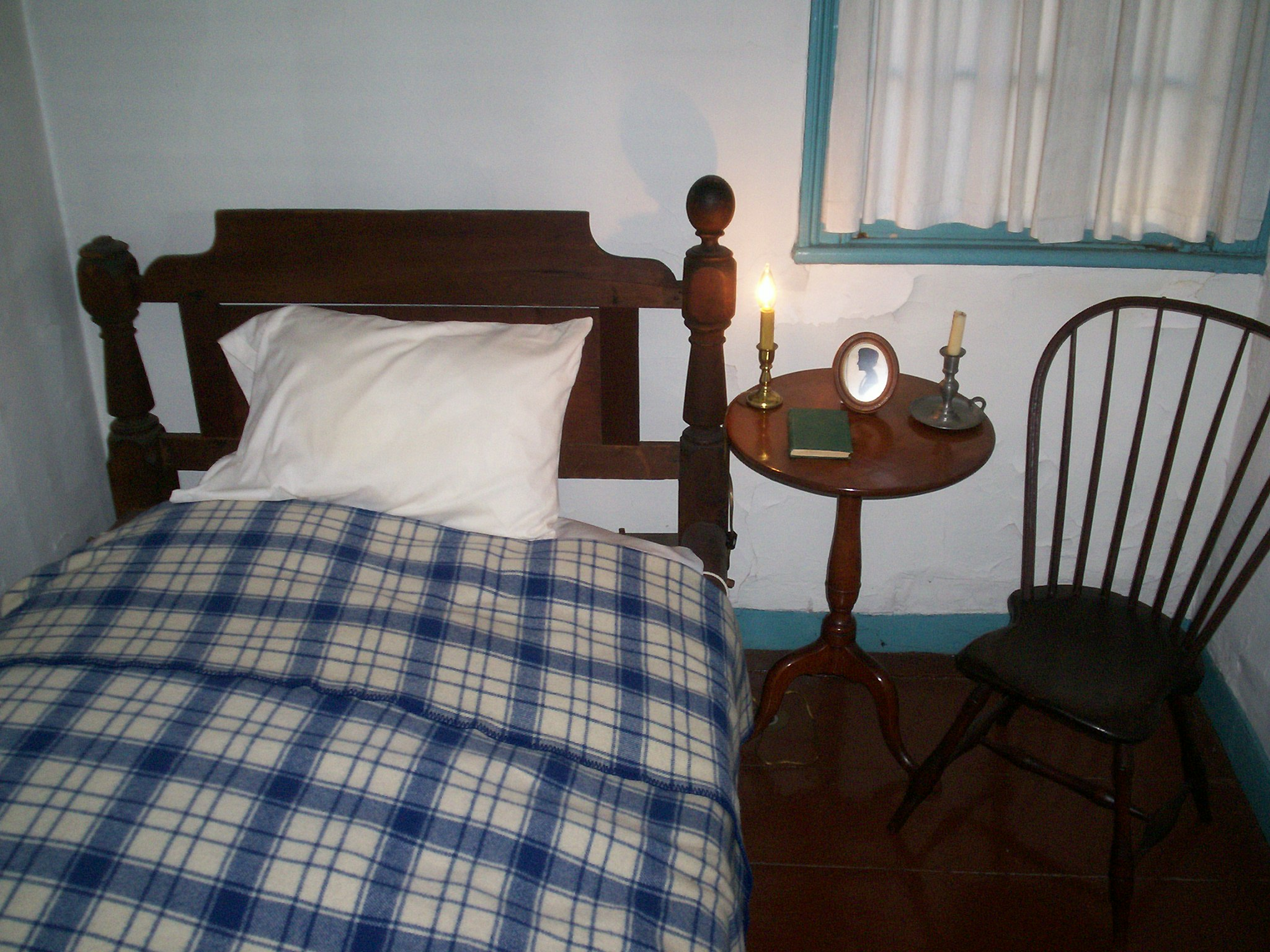
Her bedroom at Poe Cottage.

Willis, who had not corresponded with Poe for two years and had since lost his own wife, was one of his greatest supporters in this period. He sent Poe and his wife an inspirational Christmas book, The Marriage Ring; or How to Make a Home Happy.

The announcement was similar to one made for Poe's mother, Eliza Poe, during her last stages of tuberculosis. Other newspapers picked up on the story: "Great God!", said one, "is it possible, that the literary people of the Union, will let poor Poe perish by starvation and lean faced beggary in New York? For so we are led to believe, from frequent notices in the papers, stating that Poe and his wife are both down upon a bed of misery, death, and disease, with not a ducat in the world." The Saturday Evening Post asserted that Virginia was in a hopeless condition and that Poe was bereft: "It is said that Edgar A. Poe is lying dangerously with brain fever, and that his wife is in the last stages of consumption—they are without money and without friends." Even editor Hiram Fuller, whom Poe had previously sued for libel, attempted in the New York Mirror to garner support for Poe and his wife: "We, whom he has quarrelled with, will take the lead", he wrote.

Virginia was described as having dark hair and violet eyes, with skin so pale it was called "pure white", causing a "bad complexion that spoiled her looks". One visitor to the Poe family noted that "the rose-tint upon her cheek was too bright", possibly a symptom of her illness. Another visitor in Fordham wrote, "Mrs. Poe looked very young; she had large black eyes, and a pearly whiteness of complexion, which was a perfect pallor. Her pale face, her brilliant eyes, and her raven hair gave her an unearthly look." That unearthly look was mentioned by others who suggested it made her look not quite human. William Gowans, who once lodged with the family, described Virginia as a woman of "matchless beauty and loveliness, her eye could match that of any houri, and her face defy the genius of a Canova to imitate". She might have been a little plump. Many contemporary accounts as well as modern biographers remark on her childlike appearance even in the last years of her life.

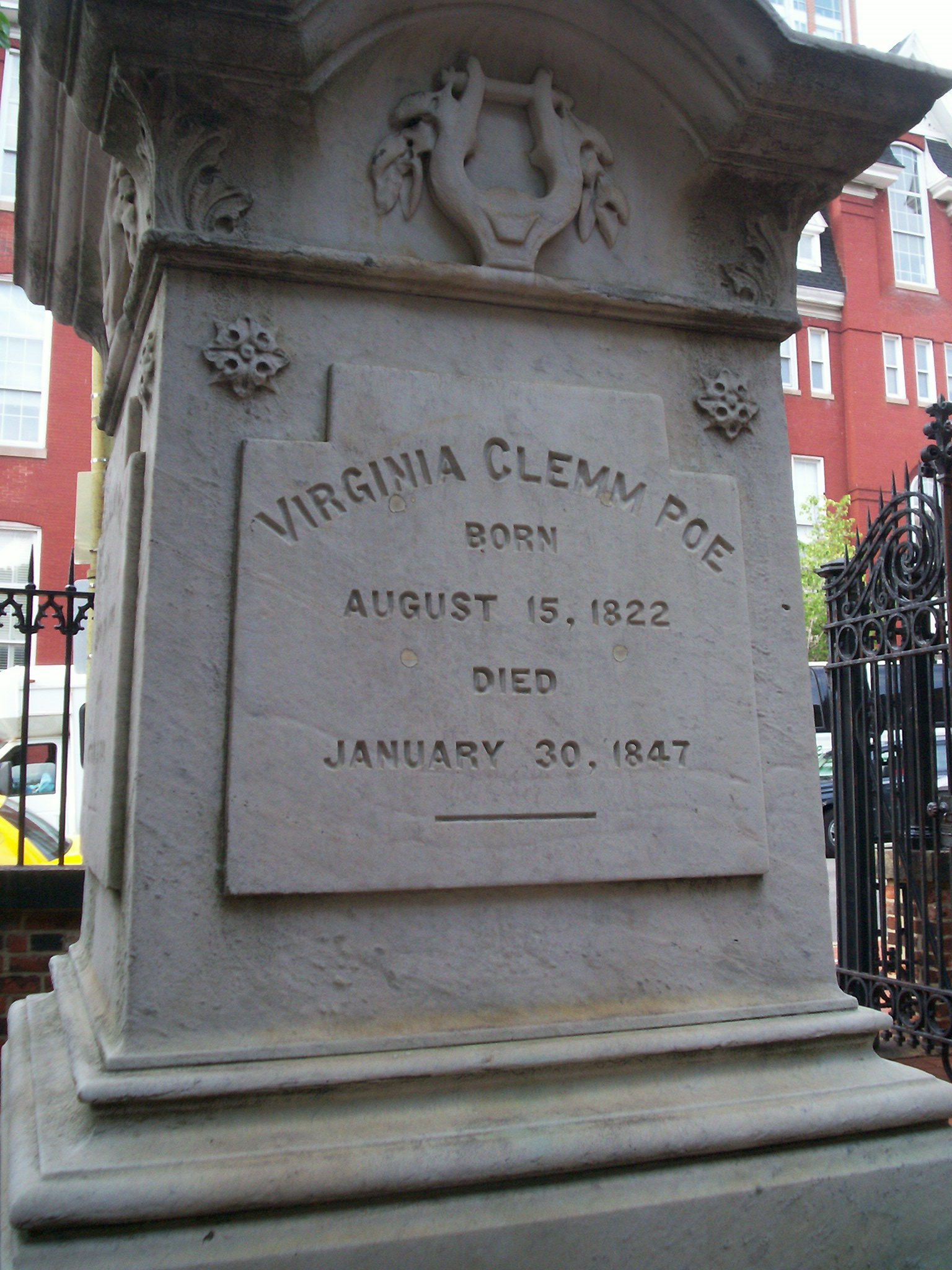
Memorial marker to Virginia Clemm, Maria Clemm, and Edgar Allan Poe in Baltimore, Maryland

While dying, Virginia asked her mother: "Darling... will you console and take care of my poor Eddy—you will never never leave him?" Her mother stayed with Poe until his own death in 1849. As Virginia was dying, the family received many visitors, including an old friend named Mary Starr. At one point Virginia put Starr's hand in Poe's and asked her to "be a friend to Eddy, and don't forsake him". Virginia was tended to by 25-year-old Marie Louise Shew. Shew, who served as a nurse, knew medical care from her father and her husband, both doctors. She provided Virginia with a comforter as her only other cover was Poe's old military cloak, as well as bottles of wine, which the invalid drank "smiling, even when difficult to get it down". Virginia also showed Poe a letter from Louisa Patterson, second wife of Poe's foster-father John Allan, which she had kept for years and which suggested that Patterson had purposely caused the break between Allan and Poe.

=== Death ===
On January 29, 1847, Poe wrote to Marie Louise Shew: "My poor Virginia still lives, although failing fast and now suffering much pain." Virginia died the following day, January 30, after five years of illness. Shew helped in organizing her funeral, even purchasing the coffin. Death notices appeared in several newspapers. On February 1, The New York Daily Tribune and the Herald carried the simple obituary: "On Saturday, the 30th ult., of pulmonary consumption, in the 25th year of her age, VIRGINIA ELIZA, wife of EDGAR A. POE." The funeral was February 2, 1847. Attendees included Nathaniel Parker Willis, Ann S. Stephens, and publisher George Pope Morris. Poe refused to look at his dead wife's face, saying he preferred to remember her living. Though now buried at Westminster Hall and Burying Ground, Virginia was originally buried in a vault owned by the Valentine family, from whom the Poes rented their Fordham cottage.

Only one image of Virginia is known to exist, for which the painter had to take her corpse as model. A few hours after her death, Poe realized he had no image of Virginia and so commissioned a portrait in watercolor. She is shown wearing "beautiful linen" that Shew said she had dressed her in; Shew might have been the portrait's artist, though this is uncertain. The image depicts her with a slight double chin and with hazel eyes. The image was passed down to the family of Virginia's half-sister Josephine, wife of Neilson Poe.

In 1875, the same year in which her husband's body was reburied, the cemetery in which she lay was destroyed and her remains were almost forgotten. An early Poe biographer, William Gill, gathered the bones and stored them in a box he hid under his bed. Gill's story was reported in the Boston Herald twenty-seven years after the event: he says that he had visited the Fordham cemetery in 1883 at exactly the moment that the sexton Dennis Valentine held Virginia's bones in his shovel, ready to throw them away as unclaimed. Poe himself had died in 1849, and so Gill took Virginia's remains and, after corresponding with Neilson Poe and John Prentiss Poe in Baltimore, arranged to bring the box down to be laid on Poe's left side in a small bronze casket. Virginia's remains were finally buried with her husband's on January 19, 1885—the seventy-sixth anniversary of her husband's birth and nearly ten years after his current monument was erected. The same man who served as sexton during Poe's original burial and his exhumations and reburials was also present at the rites which brought his body to rest with Virginia and Virginia's mother Maria Clemm.

== Effect and influence on Poe ==
Virginia's death had a significant effect on Poe. After her death, Poe was despondent for several months. A friend said of him, "the loss of his wife was a sad blow to him. He did not seem to care, after she was gone, whether he lived an hour, a day, a week or a year; she was his all." A year after her death, he wrote to a friend that he had experienced the greatest evil a man can suffer when, he said, "a wife, whom I loved as no man ever loved before", had fallen ill. While Virginia was still struggling to recover, Poe turned to alcohol after abstaining for quite some time. How often and how much he drank is a controversial issue, debated in Poe's lifetime and also by modern biographers. Poe referred to his emotional response to his wife's sickness as his own illness, and that he found the cure to it "in the death of my wife. This I can & do endure as becomes a man—it was the horrible never-ending oscillation between hope & despair which I could not longer have endured without the total loss of reason".

Poe regularly visited Virginia's grave. As his friend Charles Chauncey Burr wrote, "Many times, after the death of his beloved wife, was he found at the dead hour of a winter night, sitting beside her tomb almost frozen in the snow". Shortly after Virginia's death, Poe courted several other women, including Nancy Richmond of Lowell, Massachusetts, Sarah Helen Whitman of Providence, Rhode Island, and childhood sweetheart Sarah Elmira Royster in Richmond. Even so, Frances Sargent Osgood, whom Poe also attempted to woo, believed "that [Virginia] was the only woman whom he ever loved".

=== References in literature ===
Many of Poe's works are interpreted autobiographically, with much of his work believed to reflect Virginia's long struggle with tuberculosis and her eventual death. The most discussed example is "Annabel Lee". This poem, which depicts a dead young bride and her mourning lover, is often assumed to have been inspired by Virginia, though other women in Poe's life are potential candidates including Frances Sargent Osgood and Sarah Helen Whitman. A similar poem, "Ulalume", is also believed to be a memorial tribute to Virginia, as is "Lenore", whose title character is described as "the most lovely dead that ever died so young!" After Poe's death, George Gilfillan of the London-based Critic said Poe was responsible for his wife's death, "hurrying her to a premature grave, that he might write 'Annabel Lee' and 'The Raven'". However, "The Raven" was written and published two years before Virginia's death.

Virginia is also seen in Poe's prose. The short story "Eleonora" (1842)—which features a narrator preparing to marry his cousin, with whom he lives alongside her mother—may also refer to Virginia's illness. When Poe wrote it, his wife had just begun to show signs of her illness. It was shortly thereafter that the couple moved to New York City by boat and Poe published "The Oblong Box" (1844). This story, which shows a man mourning his young wife while transporting her corpse by boat, seems to suggest Poe's feelings about Virginia's impending death. As the ship sinks, the husband would rather die than be separated from his wife's corpse. After his wife's death, Poe edited his first published story, "Metzengerstein", to remove the narrator's line, "I would wish all I love to perish of that gentle disease", a reference to tuberculosis.
