= Sarah Elmira Shelton =

Lover of Edgar Allan Poe

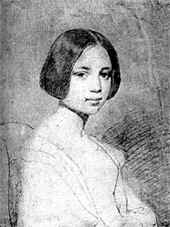
- Born: Sarah Elmira Royster; 1810; United States
- Died: February 11, 1888 (aged 77–78); United States
- Spouse: Alexander B. Shelton (1828–1844; his death)
- Children: 4 (including 2 who died in childhood)

Sarah Elmira Shelton (née Royster; 1810 – February 11, 1888) was an adolescent sweetheart of Edgar Allan Poe who became engaged to him shortly before his death in 1849.

Their early relationship, begun when she was 15, ended due to the interference of her father while Poe was studying at the University of Virginia. Two years later, she married Alexander B. Shelton, who became wealthy through his involvement in the transportation industry. The couple had four children, although only two lived past infancy. After she was widowed in 1844, Royster and her two surviving children inherited $100,000 ($3.46 million in 2025) with the stipulation that she would lose a portion of this estate if she remarried.

Poe came back into her life in 1848 and they renewed their relationship. Poe pressed her to marry him, though she was hesitant and her children did not approve. They never married; he died shortly thereafter in October 1849. Royster had an influence on Poe's work and may have inspired "The Raven" and "Annabel Lee". The early relationship between Poe and Shelton was immortalized by other writers, including Poe's brother Henry.

== Biography ==
Royster and Poe were neighbors in Richmond, Virginia when they began their relationship in 1825, when she was 15 years old and he was 16. They discussed marriage, though Royster's father vocally disapproved. They were secretly engaged as Poe began classes at the University of Virginia in 1826; however, Royster's father intercepted and destroyed all of Poe's letters to his daughter. Royster wrote later that his disapproval was only because of their young age but he likely also considered Poe unsuitable due to social and financial status as a poor orphan.

Thinking Poe had forgotten her, in 1828 Royster married Alexander B. Shelton, a businessman from a well-to-do Virginia family. Royster was only 18 at the time but quickly gained social prominence and wealth: Shelton worked in the transportation industry and was for a time the co-owner of a boat line that travelled the James River. The couple had four children, two of whom died in childhood. A third predeceased his mother in 1887, a year before her own death. Thus, only one of Sarah's children survived her. Alexander B. Shelton died of pneumonia at the age of 37 on July 12, 1844. Royster and her two children were left an estate worth $100,000.

=== Second relationship with Poe ===
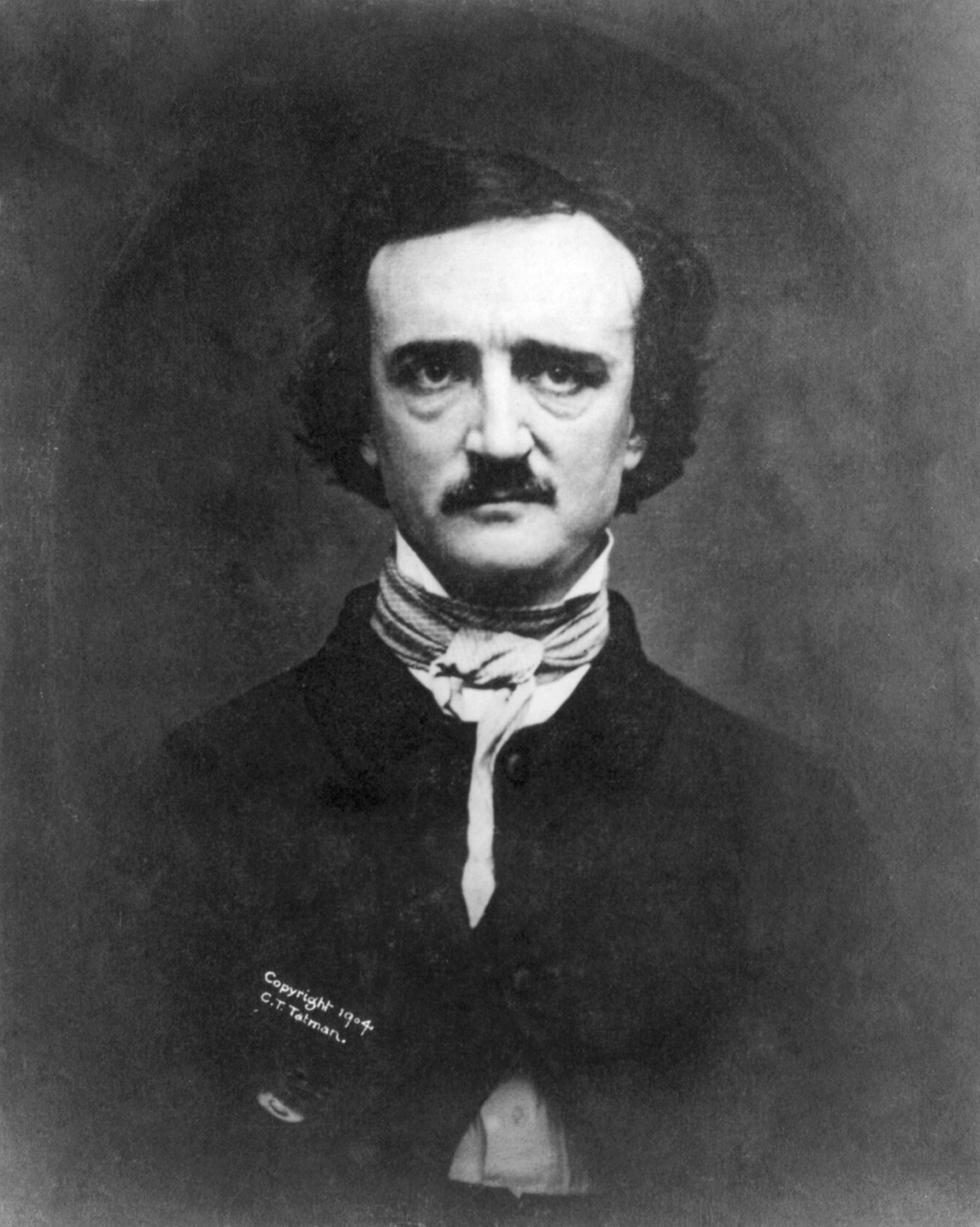
Edgar Allan Poe in 1848

Poe and Royster would meet again in July 1848, over a year after the death of Poe's wife Virginia Clemm. His visit was unannounced. As Royster described it: "I was ready to go to church and a servant told me that a gentleman in the parlor wanted to see me. I went down and was amazed to see him—but knew him instantly". By this time, Royster was very religious, having been baptized as an adult at St. John's Episcopal Church. She was 39 and living with her 19-year-old daughter Ann and 10-year-old son Southall. A friend described her as being very attractive around this time:

Her eyes were a deep blue, her hair brown, touched with grey, her nose thin and patrician... Her voice was very low, soft and sweet, her manners exquisitely refined, and intellectually she was a woman of education and force of character. Her distinguishing qualities were gentleness and womanliness.

Royster attended Poe's lecture in Richmond, sitting in the front row. Poe and Royster rekindled their relationship somewhat and discussed marriage. Her children disapproved, however, and her dead husband's will stipulated that remarriage would remove three-quarters of her estate. Poe visited Richmond on September 17, 1849, and stayed with Royster for the evening. He wrote: "I think she loves me more devotedly than any one I ever knew... I cannot help loving her in return." Poe hoped to be married before he left Richmond and pushed her to respond. She wanted time to consider: "I told him if he would not take a positive denial he must give me time to consider it". Royster may have been reluctant because of the rumors of Poe's drinking and, because of this, may have inspired Poe into joining the Richmond chapter of the Sons of Temperance. Poe's lecture tour then brought him to Norfolk, Virginia and Old Point Comfort. It is unclear if the couple was ever officially engaged but most biographers agree that they came to an "understanding" by late September.

Former residence of Elmira Shelton, Richmond, Grace Street

The wedding never took place; after Poe said goodbye to her, he left Richmond on September 27, 1849, and died mysteriously only two weeks later in Baltimore. Royster recalled her last moments with him: "He came up to my house on the evening of 26 Sept. to take leave of me.–He was very sad, and complained of being quite sick... I felt so wretched about him all of that night, that I went up early the next morning to enquire after him, when, much to my regret, he had left in the boat for Baltimore." On his deathbed, Poe mentioned a wife he had in Richmond, possibly referring to Royster.

Royster later said that she would not "have married him under any circumstances". A letter Royster wrote to Poe's mother-in-law Maria Clemm, however, announced that she was ready to accept her as her own mother-in-law. In her letter, she also referred to Poe as "the dearest object on earth" to her. Writer John Evangelist Walsh suggests that Royster's brothers were responsible for Poe's mysterious death.

=== Later life ===
After Poe's death, Royster refused to speak about him or her relationship, bluntly denying all requests and living a relatively reclusive lifestyle. In 1875, she finally granted an interview to local sculptor Edward Valentine, as a response to a Poe biography written by John H. Ingram. In this conversation, she vehemently denied ever having been engaged to Poe. In June 1884, however, she privately admitted to Dr. John Joseph Moran, Poe's attending physician at the time of his death, that she and Poe had been engaged.

Royster died on February 11, 1888, and her obituary, published on the front page of the Richmond Whig on February 12, bore the heading "Poe's First and Last Love".

== References in literature ==
Many of the poems in Poe's first published work, Tamerlane and Other Poems (1827), were inspired by his failed childhood romance with Royster, with many lines discussing the follies of youth and lost love. One of Poe's minor poems, "Song," is presumed to be about Royster. She also believed that the "lost Lenore" in the poem "The Raven" as well as the title character in "Annabel Lee" were representative of her and claimed that Poe himself had assured her of it. Biographers, however, often debate Poe's inspiration, particularly for "Annabel Lee". Poe's wife Virginia, who had died two years prior to the poem's publication, was suggested by poet Frances Sargent Osgood and generally is considered the most likely candidate for the title character, though Osgood herself is another possibility. Sarah Helen Whitman and Sarah Anna Lewis also claimed to have inspired the poem. Even so, in her later years, Royster was known familiarly in Richmond as "Poe's Lenore".

Poe's brother, Henry Poe, also wrote a short story based on his brother's young romance with Royster called "The Pirate" which was published in the October 27, 1827, issue of the North American. Lambert A. Wilmer, a Baltimore writer who was friend of both Poe brothers, also wrote about the young relationship. His drama in verse, Merlin, was in three parts, the first of which was published on August 18, 1827.
