= Cooping =

Form of electoral fraud

Cooping was a form of electoral fraud in the United States by which gangs kidnapped citizens off the street and forced them to vote, often repeatedly, for an election candidate. It has been cited speculatively in relation to the death of Edgar Allan Poe in October 1849.

According to some of Poe's biographers, so-called "cooping gangs" or "election gangs" working for a political candidate would hold random victims in a chamber or cellar (the "coop") and ply them with alcohol or beat them to get them to comply. Often their clothing or other aspects of their appearance would be altered to fool voting officials, enabling them to vote multiple times.

Other 19th-century accounts do not relate to voter fraud but instead, describe press gangs that used cooping to pressure recruits for the Union Army during the American Civil War. One claim of cooping enlistees was made in a letter from Brigadier General Edward Winslow Hincks read by the Clerk of the House of Representatives in 1865. The general, who was in charge of the enlistment in New York, blamed the poor quality of enlisted men on cooping, whereby the men were "cooped up", plied with drink to the point of stupefaction, and tricked into enlisting.

== See also ==
- Ballot stuffing – Illegally voting multiple times
- Shanghaiing – Kidnapping people to serve as sailors
