= Rufus Wilmot Griswold =

American anthologist (1815–1857)

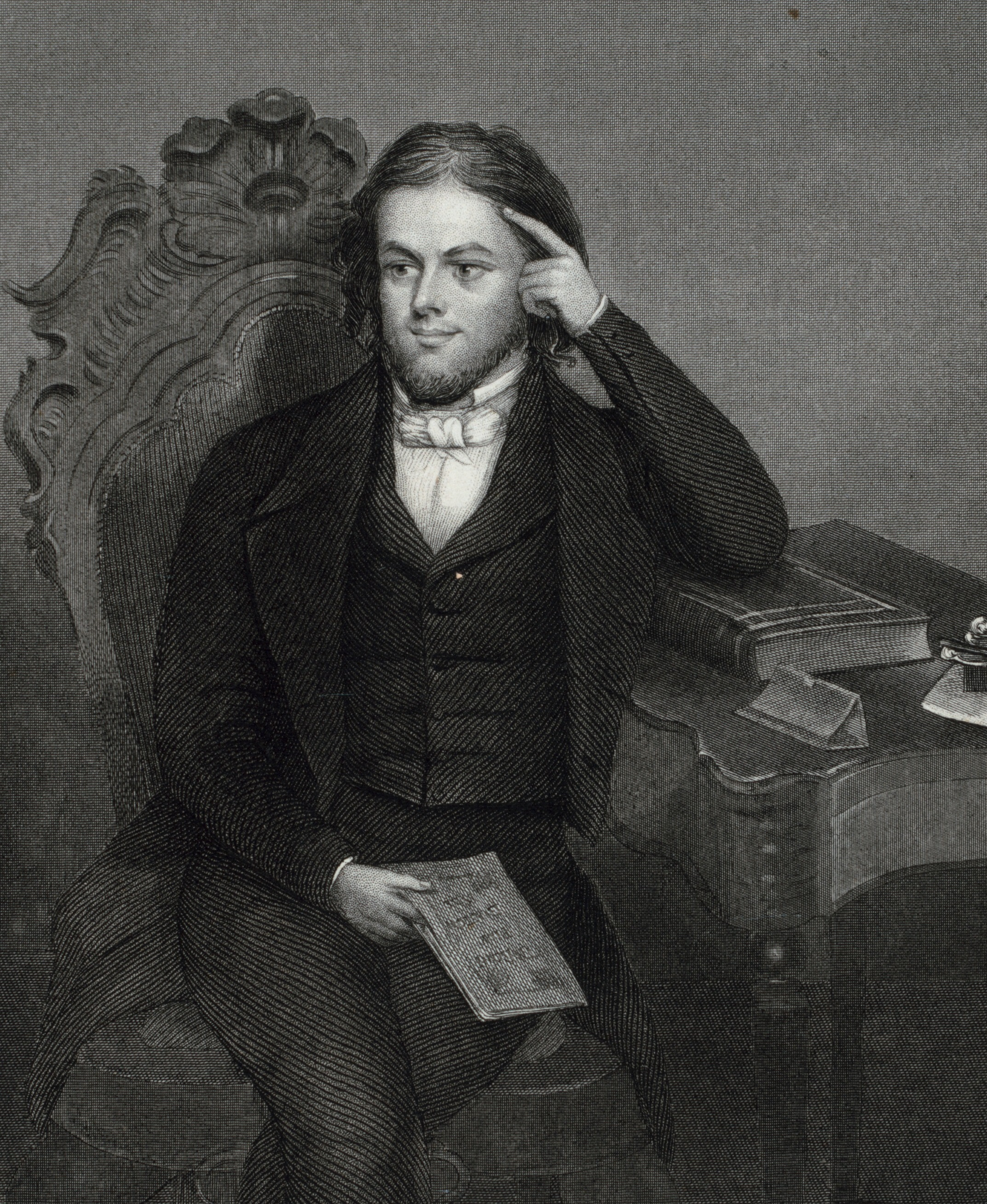
- 1845 engraving
- Born: February 13, 1815; Benson, Vermont, U.S.
- Died: August 27, 1857 (aged 42); New York City, U.S.
- Occupations: Editor; literary critic; writer
- Writing career
- Pen name: Ludwig

Rufus Wilmot Griswold (February 13, 1815 – August 27, 1857) was an American anthologist, editor, poet, and critic. Born in Vermont, Griswold left home when he was 15 years old. He worked as a journalist, editor, and critic in Philadelphia, New York City, and elsewhere. He built a strong literary reputation, in part due to his 1842 collection The Poets and Poetry of America. This anthology, the most comprehensive of its time, included what he deemed the best examples of American poetry. He produced revised versions and similar anthologies for the remainder of his life, although many of the poets he promoted have since faded into obscurity. Many writers hoped to have their work included in one of these editions, although they commented harshly on Griswold's abrasive character. Griswold was married three times: his first wife died young, his second marriage ended in a public and controversial divorce, and his third wife left him after the previous divorce was almost repealed.

Edgar Allan Poe, whose poetry had been included in Griswold's anthology, published a critical response that questioned which poets were included. This began a rivalry which grew when Griswold succeeded Poe as editor of Graham's Magazine at a salary higher than Poe's. Later, the two competed for the attention of poet Frances Sargent Osgood. They never reconciled their differences, and after Poe's mysterious death in 1849, Griswold wrote an unsympathetic obituary. Claiming to be Poe's chosen literary executor, he began a campaign to harm Poe's reputation that lasted until his own death eight years later.

Griswold considered himself an expert in American poetry and was an early proponent of its inclusion on the school curriculum. He also supported the introduction of copyright legislation, speaking to Congress on behalf of the publishing industry, but he was not above infringing the copyright of other people's work. A fellow editor remarked "even while haranguing the loudest, [he] is purloining the fastest".

== Life and career ==
=== Early life ===
Griswold was born to Rufus and Deborah (Wass) Griswold on February 13, 1815, in Vermont, near Rutland, and raised a strict Calvinist in the hamlet of Benson. He was the twelfth of fourteen children and his father was a farmer and shoemaker. In 1822, the family sold the Benson farm and moved to nearby Hubbardton. As a child, Griswold was complex, unpredictable, and reckless. He left home when he was 15, calling himself a "solitary soul, wandering through the world, a homeless, joyless outcast".

Griswold moved to Albany, New York, and lived with a 22-year-old flute-playing journalist named George C. Foster, a writer best known for his work New-York by Gas-Light. Griswold lived with Foster until he was 17, and the two may have had a romantic relationship. When Griswold moved away, Foster wrote to him begging him to return, signing his letter "come to me if you love me". Griswold attempted to enroll at the Rensselaer School in 1830, but was not allowed to take any classes after he was caught attempting to play a prank on a professor.

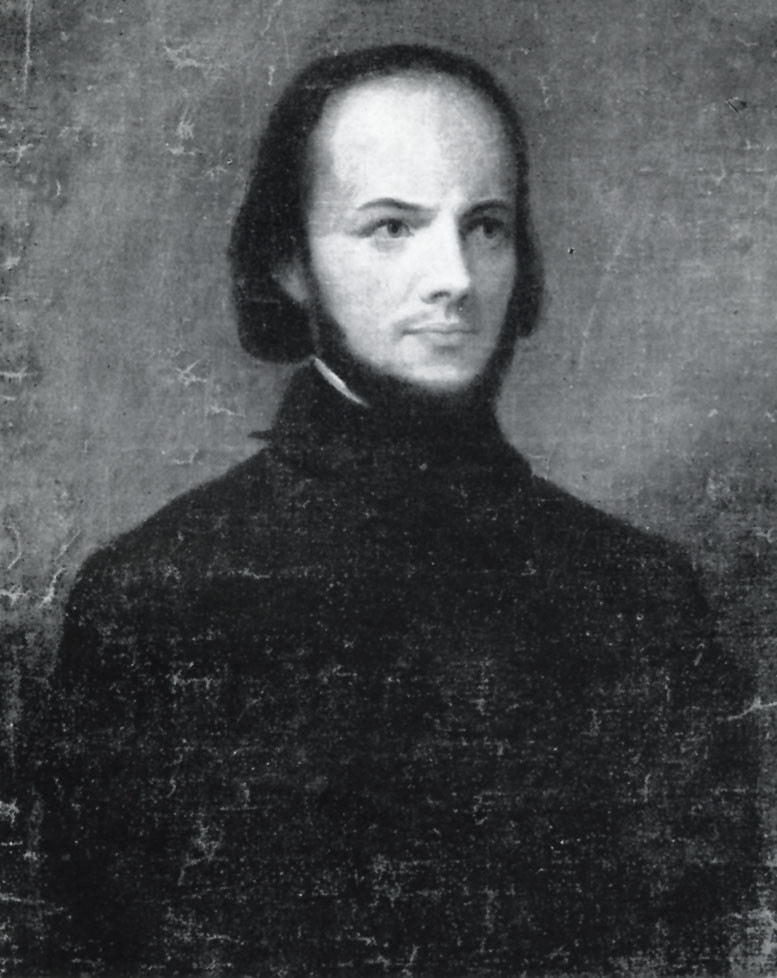
Griswold, circa 1840

=== Early career and first marriage ===
After a brief spell as a printer's apprentice, Griswold moved to Syracuse, New York, where he started a newspaper with friends titled The Porcupine. This publication purposefully targeted locals for what was later remembered as merely malicious critique.

He moved to New York City in 1836, and in March of that year, was introduced to 19-year-old Caroline Searles, whom he later married. He was employed as an editor for various publications in the New York area. In October, he considered running for office as a Whig but did not receive the party's support. In 1837, he was licensed as a Baptist clergyman, but he never had a permanent congregation.

Griswold married Caroline on August 12, 1837, and the couple had two daughters. Following the birth of their second daughter, Griswold left his family behind in New York and moved to Philadelphia. His departure on November 27, 1840 was by all accounts abrupt, leaving his job with Horace Greeley's New York Tribune, and his library of several thousand volumes. He joined the staff of Philadelphia's Daily Standard and began to build his reputation as a literary critic, becoming known for his savagery and vindictiveness.

On November 6, 1842, Griswold visited his wife in New York after she had given birth to their third child, a son. Three days later, after returning to Philadelphia, he was informed that both she and the infant had died. Deeply shocked, Griswold traveled by train alongside her coffin, refusing to leave her side for 30 hours. When fellow passengers urged him to try to sleep, he answered by kissing her dead lips and embracing her, his two children crying next to him. He refused to leave the cemetery after her funeral, even after the other mourners had left, until forced to do so by a relative. He wrote a long poem in blank verse dedicated to Caroline, titled "Five Days", which was printed in the New York Tribune on November 16, 1842. Griswold had difficulty believing she had died and often dreamed of their reunion. Forty days after her entombment, he entered her vault, cut off a lock of her hair, kissed her on the forehead and lips, and wept for several hours, staying by her side until a friend found him 30 hours later.

=== Anthologist and critic ===
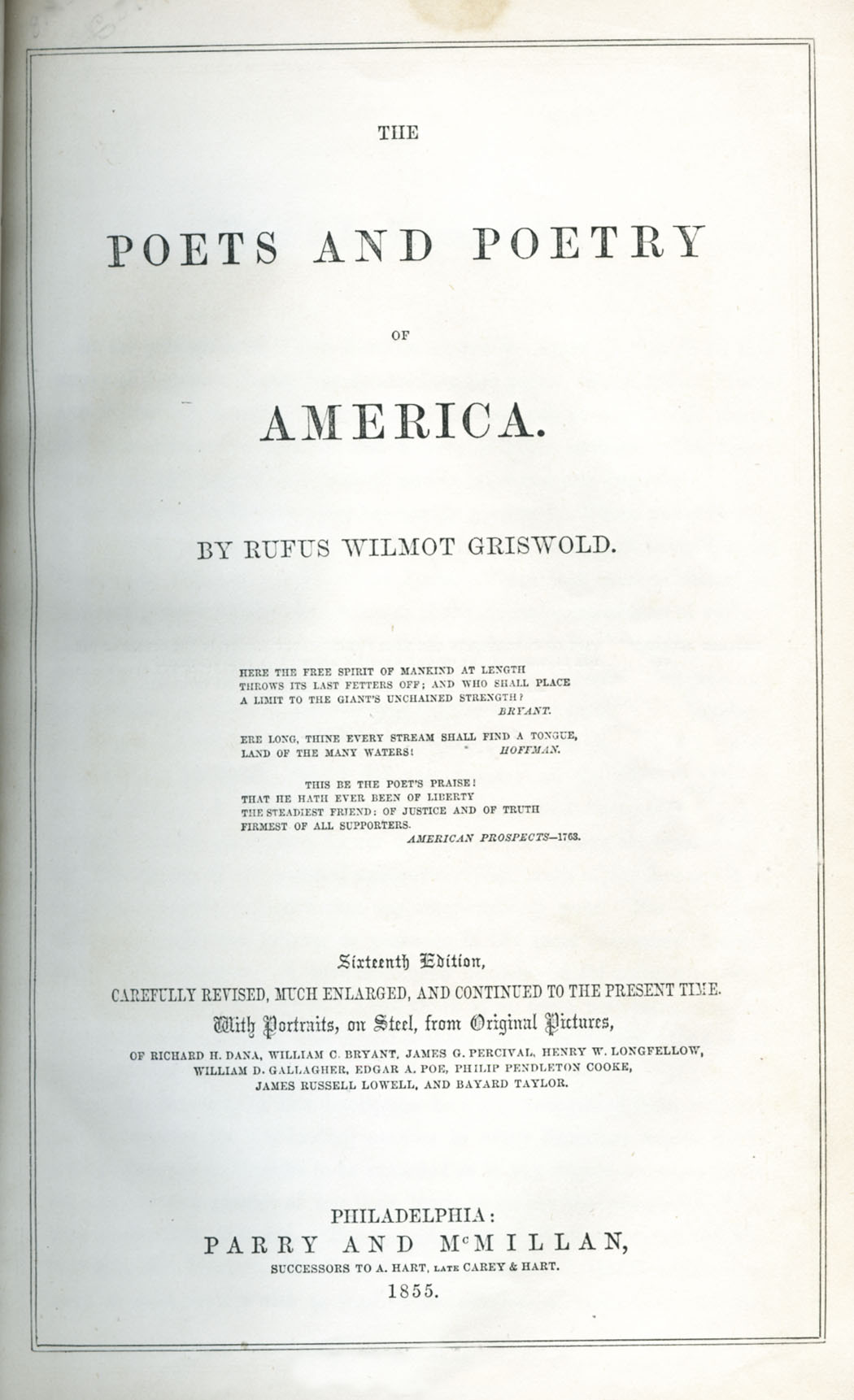
Title page of the 1855 edition of The Poets and Poetry of America

In 1842, Griswold released his 476-page anthology of American poetry, The Poets and Poetry of America, which he dedicated to Washington Allston. Griswold's collection featured poems from over 80 authors, including 17 by Lydia Sigourney, three by Edgar Allan Poe, and 45 by Charles Fenno Hoffman. Hoffman, a close friend, was allotted twice as much space as any other author. Griswold oversaw many anthologies, including Biographical Annual, which collected memoirs of "eminent persons recently deceased", Gems from American Female Poets, Prose Writers of America, and Female Poets of America.

Between 1842 and 1845, while Griswold was collecting material for Prose Writers of America, he discovered the identity of Horace Binney Wallace, who had been writing in various literary magazines at the time (including Burton's Gentleman's Magazine) under the pen name William Landor. Wallace declined to be included in the anthology but the two became friends, exchanging many letters over the years. Wallace eventually ghostwrote Griswold's Napoleon and the Marshals of the Empire (1847).

Prose Writers of America, published in 1847, was prepared specifically to compete with a similar anthology by Cornelius Mathews and Evert Augustus Duyckinck. The prose collection earned Griswold a rivalry with the two men, which Griswold expected. As it was being published, Griswold wrote to Boston publisher James T. Fields that "Young America will be rabid". In preparing his anthologies, Griswold wrote to the living authors whose work he was including to ask their suggestions on which poems to include as well as to gather information for a biographical sketch.

In 1843, Griswold founded The Opal, an annual gift book that collected essays, stories, and poetry. Nathaniel Parker Willis edited its first edition, released in the fall of 1844. For a time, Griswold was editor of the Saturday Evening Post and published a collection of poetry, titled The Cypress Wreath (1844). His poems, with titles such as "The Happy Hour of Death", "On the Death of a Young Girl", and "The Slumber of Death", emphasized mortality and mourning. Another collection of his poetry, Christian Ballads and Other Poems, was published in 1844, and his nonfiction book, The Republican Court or, American Society in the Days of Washington, was published in 1854. The book is meant to cover events during the presidency of George Washington, though it mixes historical fact with apocryphal legend until one is indistinguishable from the other. During this period, Griswold occasionally offered his services at the pulpit delivering sermons and he may have received an honorary doctorate from Shurtleff College, a Baptist institution in Illinois, leading to his nickname the "Reverend Dr. Griswold".

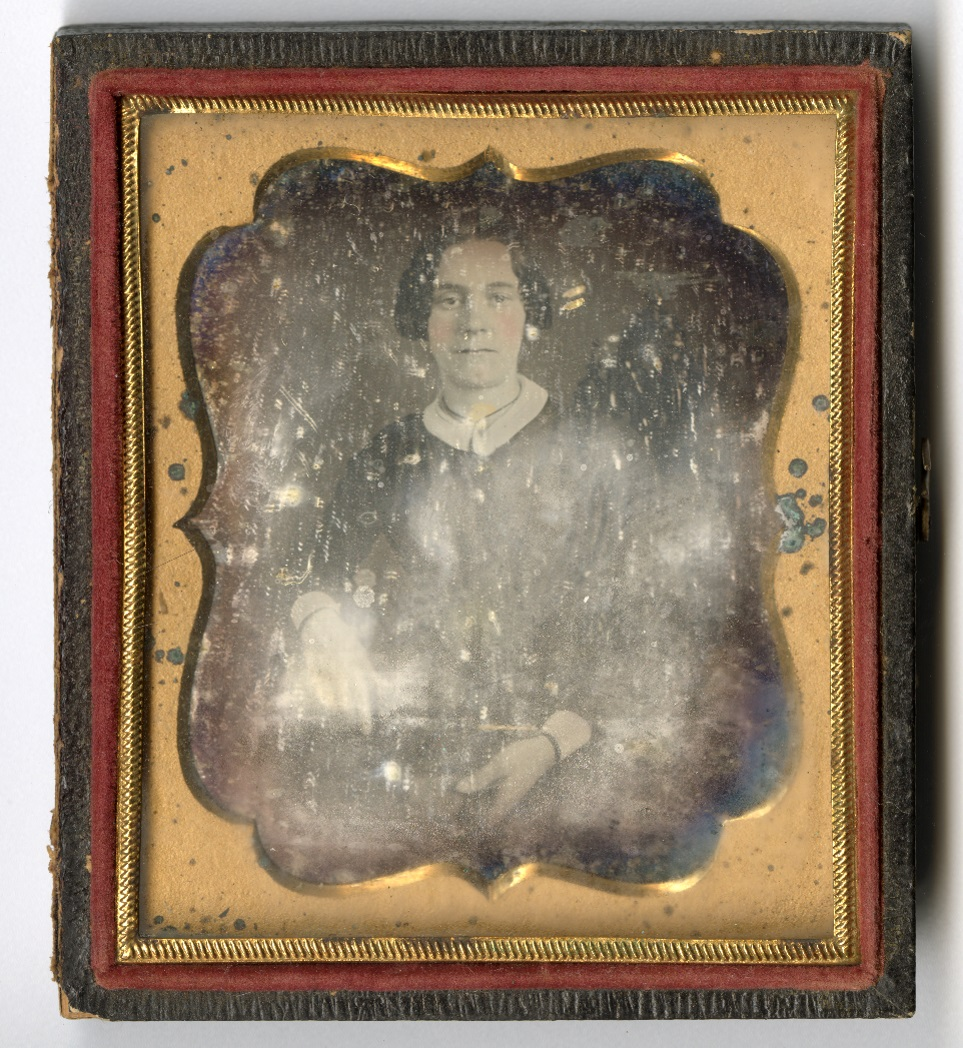
Daguerreotype portrait of Charlotte Myers Griswold

=== Second marriage ===
On August 20, 1845, Griswold married Charlotte Myers, a Jewish woman; she was 42 and he was 33. Griswold had been pressured into the marriage by the woman's aunts despite his concern about their difference in religious beliefs. This difference was strong enough that one of Griswold's friends referred to his wife only as "the little Jewess". On their wedding night, he discovered that she was, according to Griswold biographer Joy Bayless, "through some physical misfortune, incapable of being a wife" or, as Poe biographer Kenneth Silverman explains, incapable of having sex. Griswold considered the marriage void and no more valid "than there would have been had the ceremony taken place between parties of the same sex, or where the sex of one was doubtful or ambiguous". Still, the couple moved together to Charleston, South Carolina, Charlotte's home town, and lived under the same roof, albeit sleeping in separate rooms. Neither of the two was happy with the situation, and at the end of April 1846, she had a lawyer write a contract "to separate, altogether and forever, ... which would in effect be a divorce". The contract forbade Griswold from remarrying and paid him $1,000 (~$35,833 in 2025) for expenses in exchange for his daughter Caroline staying with the Myers family. After this separation, Griswold immediately moved back to Philadelphia.

=== Move to New York City ===
A few years later, Griswold moved back to New York City, leaving his younger daughter in the care of the Myers family and his elder daughter, Emily, with relatives on her mother's side. He had by now earned the nickname "Grand Turk", and in the summer of 1847, made plans to edit an anthology of poetry by American women. He believed that women were incapable of the same kind of "intellectual" poetry as men and believed they needed to be divided: "The conditions of aesthetic ability in the two sexes are probably distinct, or even opposite", he wrote in his introduction. The selections he chose for The Female Poets of America were not necessarily the greatest examples of poetry but instead were chosen because they emphasized traditional morality and values. The same year, Griswold began working on what he considered "the maximum opus of his life", an extensive biographical dictionary. Although he worked on it for several years and even advertised for it, he never produced it. He also helped Elizabeth F. Ellet publish her book Women of the American Revolution, and was angered when she did not acknowledge his assistance in the book. In July 1848, he visited poet Sarah Helen Whitman in Providence, Rhode Island, but he had been suffering with vertigo and exhaustion, rarely leaving his apartment at New York University, and was unable to write without taking opium. In autumn of that year, he had an epileptic seizure, the first of many he would have for the remainder of his life. One seizure caused him to fall out of a ferry in Brooklyn and nearly drown. He wrote to publisher James T. Fields: "I am in a terrible condition, physically and mentally. I do not know what the end will be ... I am exhausted—betwixt life and death—and heaven and hell." In 1849, he was further troubled when Charles Fenno Hoffman, with whom he had become good friends, was committed to an insane asylum.

Griswold continued editing and contributing literary criticism for various publications, both full-time and freelance, including 22 months from July 1, 1850, to April 1, 1852, with The International Magazine. There, he worked with contributors including Elizabeth Oakes Smith, Mary E. Hewitt and John R. Thompson. In the November 10, 1855, issue of The Criterion, Griswold anonymously reviewed the first edition of Walt Whitman's Leaves of Grass, declaring: "It is impossible to image how any man's fancy could have conceived such a mass of stupid filth". Griswold charged that Whitman was guilty of "the vilest imaginings and shamefullest license", a "degrading, beastly sensuality." Referring to Whitman's poetry, Griswold said he left "this gathering of muck to the laws which ... must have the power to suppress such gross obscenity." Whitman later included Griswold's review in a new edition of Leaves of Grass. He ended his review with a phrase in Latin referring to "that horrible sin, among Christians not to be named", the stock phrase long associated with Christian condemnations of sodomy, referring in this instance to homosexual, rather than heterosexual sodomy. Griswold was the first person in the 19th century to publicly point to and stress the theme of erotic desire and acts between men in Whitman's poetry. More attention to that aspect of Whitman's poetry surfaced late in the 19th century.

=== Divorce and third marriage ===
After a brief flirtation with poet Alice Cary, Griswold pursued a relationship with Harriet McCrillis. He originally did not want to divorce Charlotte Myers because he "dreaded the publicity" and because of her love for his daughter. He applied for divorce at the Court of Common Pleas in Philadelphia on March 25, 1852. Elizabeth Ellet and Ann S. Stephens wrote to Myers urging her not to grant the divorce, and to McCrillis not to marry him. To convince Myers to agree to the divorce, Griswold allowed her to keep his daughter Caroline if she signed a statement that she had deserted him. She agreed, and the divorce was made official December 18; he likely never saw Myers or his daughter again. McCrillis and Griswold were married shortly thereafter on December 26, 1852, and settled at 196 West Twenty-third Street in New York. Their son, William, was born on October 9, 1853.

Ellet and Stephens continued writing to Griswold's ex-wife, urging her to have the divorce repealed. Myers was convinced and filed in Philadelphia on September 23, 1853. The court, however, had lost records of the divorce and had to delay the appeal. Adding to Griswold's troubles, that fall, a gas leak in his home caused an explosion and a fire. He was severely burned, losing his eyelashes, eyebrows, and seven of his finger nails. The same year, his 15-year-old daughter, Emily, nearly died in Connecticut. A train she was riding on had fallen off a drawbridge into a river. When Griswold arrived, he saw 49 corpses in a makeshift morgue. Emily had been pronounced dead when pinned underwater but a doctor was able to revive her. On February 24, 1856, the divorce appeal went to court, with Ellet and Stephens providing lengthy testimony against Griswold's character. Neither Griswold nor Myers attended, and the appeal was dismissed. Embarrassed by the ordeal, McCrillis left Griswold in New York and moved in with family in Bangor, Maine.

=== Death ===
Griswold died of tuberculosis in New York City on August 27, 1857. Estelle Anna Lewis, a friend and writer, suggested that the interference of Elizabeth Ellet had exacerbated Griswold's condition and that she "goaded Griswold to his death". At the time of his death, the sole decorations found in his room were portraits of himself, Frances Osgood, and Poe. A friend, Charles Godfrey Leland, found in Griswold's desk several documents attacking a number of authors which Griswold was preparing for publication. Leland decided to burn them.

Griswold's funeral was held on August 30. His pallbearers included Leland, Charles Frederick Briggs, George Henry Moore, and Richard Henry Stoddard. His remains were left for eight years in the receiving tomb of Green-Wood Cemetery before being buried on July 12, 1865, without a headstone. Although his library of several thousand volumes was auctioned, raising over $3,000 (~$48,015 in 2024) to be put toward a monument, none was commissioned.

== Reputation and influence ==
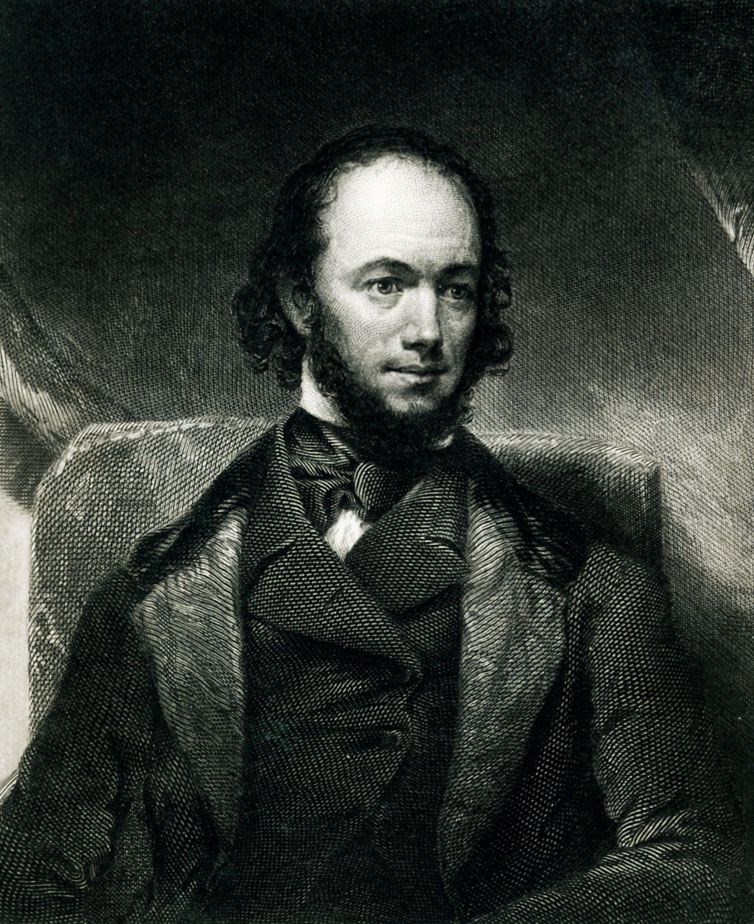
Engraving from an 1855 edition of The Poets and Poetry of America

Griswold's anthology The Poets and Poetry of America was the most comprehensive of its kind to date. As critic Lewis Gaylord Clark said, it was expected Griswold's book would "become incorporated into the permanent undying literature of our age and nation". The anthology helped Griswold build up a considerable reputation throughout the 1840s and 1850s and its first edition went through three printings in only six months. His choice of authors, however, was occasionally questioned. A British editor reviewed the collection and concluded, "with two or three exceptions, there is not a poet of mark in the whole Union" and referred to the anthology as "the most conspicuous act of martyrdom yet committed in the service of the transatlantic muses". Even so, the book was popular and was continued in several editions after Griswold's death by Richard Henry Stoddard.

In later times, The Poets and Poetry of America has been nicknamed a "graveyard of poets" because its anthologized writers have since passed into obscurity to become, as literary historian Fred Lewis Pattee wrote, "dead ... beyond all resurrection". Pattee also called the book a "collection of poetic trash" and "voluminous worthlessness".

Within the contemporary American literary scene Griswold became known as erratic, dogmatic, pretentious, and vindictive. Historian Perry Miller wrote "Griswold was about as devious as they came in this era of deviousness; did not ample documentation prove that he actually existed, we might suppose him ... one of the less plausible inventions of Charles Dickens". Later anthologies such as Prose Writers of America and Female Poets of America helped him become known as a literary dictator, whose approval writers sought even while they feared his growing power. Even as they tried to impress him, however, several authors voiced their opinion on Griswold's character. Ann S. Stephens called him two-faced and "constitutionally incapable of speaking the truth". Even his friends knew him as a consummate liar and had a saying: "Is that a Griswold or a fact?" Another friend once called him "one of the most irritable and vindictive men I ever met". Author Cornelius Mathews wrote in 1847 that Griswold fished for writers to exploit, warning "the poor little innocent fishes" to avoid his "Griswold Hook". A review of one of Griswold's anthologies, published anonymously in the Philadelphia Saturday Museum on January 28, 1843, but believed to have been written by Poe, asked: "What will be [Griswold's] fate? Forgotten, save only by those whom he has injured and insulted, he will sink into oblivion, without leaving a landmark to tell that he once existed; or if he is spoken of hereafter, he will be quoted as the unfaithful servant who abused his trust."

James Russell Lowell, who had privately called Griswold "an ass and, what's more, a knave", composed a verse on Griswold's temperament in his satirical A Fable for Critics:

But stay, here comes Tityrus Griswold, and leads on
The flocks whom he first plucks alive, and then feeds on—
A loud-cackling swarm, in whose feathers warm dressed,
He goes for as perfect a – swan as the rest.

Griswold was one of the early proponents of teaching schoolchildren American poetry in addition to English poetry. One of his anthologies, Readings in American Poetry for the Use of Schools, was created specifically for that purpose. His knowledge in American poetry was emphasized by his claim that he had read every American poem published before 1850—an estimated 500 volumes. "He has more literary patriotism, if the phrase be allowable ... than any person we ever knew", wrote a contributor to Graham's. "Since the Pilgrims landed, no man or woman has written anything on any subject which has escaped his untiring research." Oliver Wendell Holmes Sr. noted that Griswold researched literature like "a kind of naturalist whose subjects are authors, whose memory is a perfect fauna of all flying and creeping things that feed on ink."

Evert Augustus Duyckinck commented that "the thought [of a national literature] seems to have entered and taken possession of (Griswold's) mind with the force of monomania". Poet Philip Pendleton Cooke questioned Griswold's sincerity, saying he "should have loved [it] ... better than to say it". By the 1850s, Griswold's literary nationalism had subsided somewhat, and he began following the more popular contemporary trend of reading literature from England, France, and Germany. He disassociated himself from the "absurd notion ... that we are to create an entirely new literature".

Publicly, Griswold supported the establishment of international copyright, but he often duplicated entire works during his time as an editor, particularly with The Brother Jonathan. A contemporary editor said of him: "He takes advantage of a state of things which he declares to be 'immoral, unjust and wicked,' and even while haranguing the loudest, is purloining the fastest." Even so, he was chosen to represent the publishing industry before Congress in the spring of 1844 to discuss the need for copyright law.

== Relationship with Poe ==
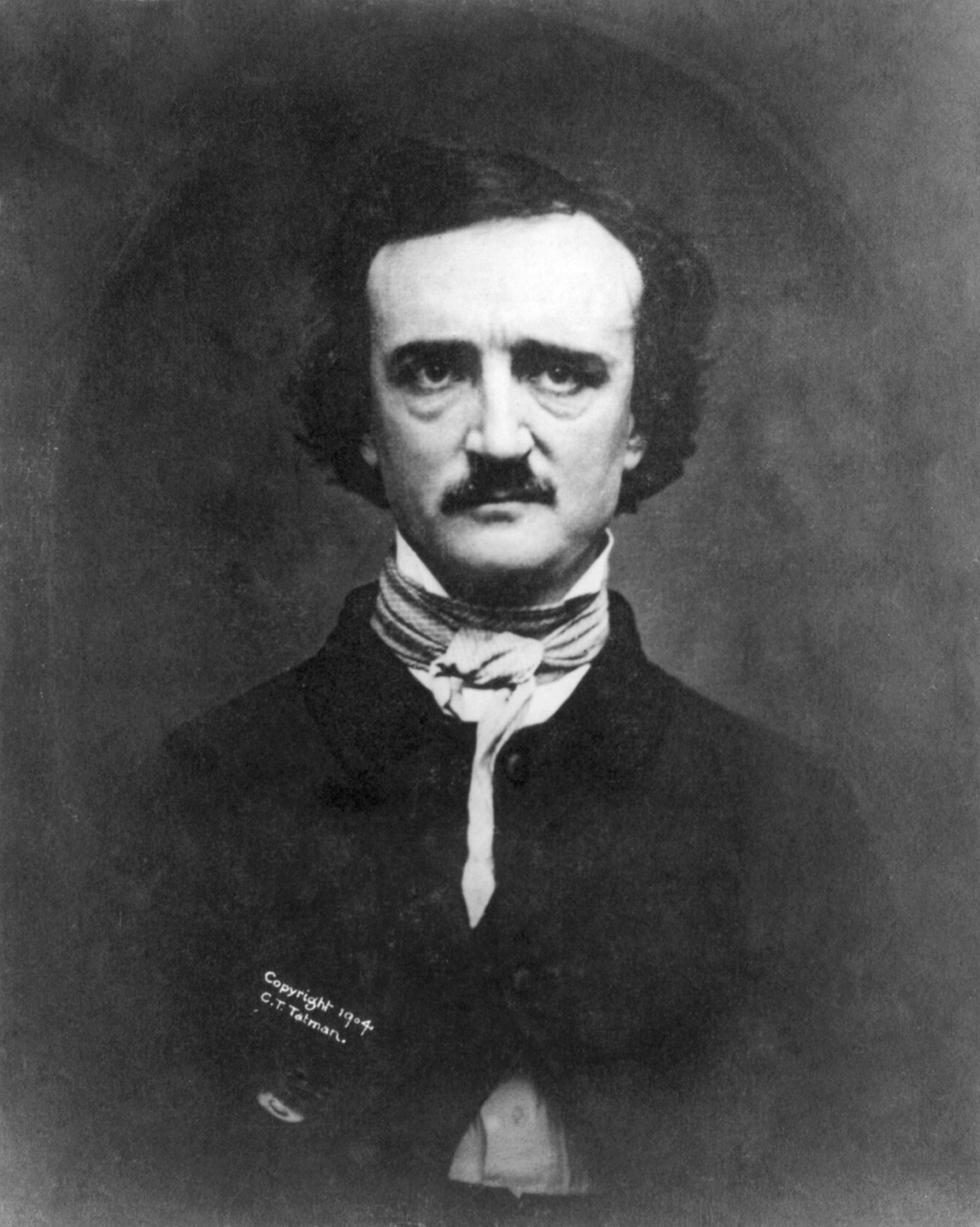
1848 Daguerreotype of Edgar Allan Poe at 39, a year before his death

Griswold first met Edgar Allan Poe in Philadelphia in May 1841 while working for the Daily Standard. At the outset, their relationship was cordial, at least superficially. In a letter dated March 29, 1841, Poe sent Griswold several poems for The Poets and Poetry of America anthology, writing that he would be proud to see "one or two of them in the book". Griswold included three of these poems: "Coliseum", "The Haunted Palace", and "The Sleeper". In November of this year, Poe, who previously praised Griswold in his "Autography" series as "a gentleman of fine taste and sound judgment", wrote a critical review of the anthology, on Griswold's behalf. Griswold paid Poe for the review and used his influence to have it published in a Boston periodical. The review was generally favorable, but Poe questioned the inclusion of certain authors and the omission of others. Poe also said that Griswold "unduly favored" New England writers. Griswold had expected more praise, and Poe privately told others he was not particularly impressed by the book, even calling it "a most outrageous humbug" in a letter to a friend. In another letter, this time to fellow writer Frederick W. Thomas, Poe suggested that Griswold's promise to help get the review published was a bribe for a favorable review, knowing Poe needed the money.

Making the relationship more strained, only months later, Griswold was hired by George Rex Graham to take up Poe's former position as editor of Graham's Magazine. Griswold, however, was paid more and given more editorial control of the magazine than Poe. Shortly after, Poe began presenting a series of lectures called "The Poets and Poetry of America", the first of which was given in Philadelphia on November 25, 1843. Poe openly attacked Griswold in front of his large audience and continued to do so in similar lectures. Graham said that during these lectures, Poe "gave Mr. Griswold some raps over the knuckles of force sufficient to be remembered". In a letter dated January 16, 1845, Poe tried to reconcile with Griswold, promising him that his lecture now omitted all that Griswold found objectionable.

Another source of animosity between the two men was their competition for the attention of the poet Frances Sargent Osgood in the mid to late 1840s. While both she and Poe were still married to their respective spouses, the two carried on a public flirtation that resulted in much gossip among the literati. Griswold, who was smitten with Osgood, escorted her to literary salons and became her staunchest defender. "She is in all things the most admirable woman I ever knew", he wrote to publisher James T. Fields in 1848. Osgood responded by dedicating a collection of her poetry to Griswold "as a souvenir of admiration for his genius, of regard for his generous character, and of gratitude for his valuable literary counsels".

=== "Ludwig" obituary ===
After Poe's death, Griswold prepared an obituary signed with the pseudonym Ludwig. First printed in the October 9, 1849, issue of the New York Tribune, it was soon republished many times. Here he asserted that "few will be grieved" by Poe's death as he had few friends. He claimed that Poe often wandered the streets, either in "madness or melancholy", mumbling and cursing to himself, was easily irritated, was envious of others, and that he "regarded society as composed of villains". Poe's drive to succeed, Griswold wrote, was because he sought "the right to despise a world which galled his self-conceit". Much of this characterization of Poe was copied almost verbatim from that of the fictitious Francis Vivian in The Caxtons by Edward Bulwer-Lytton.

Griswold biographer Joy Bayless wrote that Griswold used a pseudonym not to conceal his relationship to the obituary but because it was his custom never to sign his newspaper and magazine contributions. Regardless, Griswold's true identity was soon revealed. In a letter to Sarah Helen Whitman dated December 17, 1849, he admitted his role in writing Poe's death notice. "I was not his friend, nor was he mine", he wrote.

=== Memoir ===
Griswold claimed that "among the last requests of Mr. Poe" was that he become his literary executor "for the benefit of his family". Griswold claimed that Poe's aunt and mother-in-law Maria Clemm said Poe had made such a statement on June 9, 1849, and that she herself released any claim to Poe's works. And indeed a document exists in which Clemm transfers power of attorney to Griswold, dated October 20, 1849, although there are no signed witnesses. Clemm, however, had no right to make such a decision; Poe's younger sister Rosalie was his closest next of kin. Although Griswold had acted as a literary agent for other American writers, it is unclear if Poe really appointed Griswold his executor (perhaps as part of his "Imp of the Perverse"), if it were a trick on Griswold's part, or a mistake on Maria Clemm's. It is also possible that Osgood persuaded Poe to name Griswold as his executor.

In any case, Griswold, along with James Russell Lowell and Nathaniel Parker Willis, edited a posthumous collection of Poe's works published in three volumes starting in January 1850. He did not share the profits of his edition with Poe's surviving relatives. This edition included a biographical sketch titled "Memoir of the Author" which has become notorious for its inaccuracy. The "Memoir" depicts Poe as a madman, addicted to drugs and chronically drunk. Many elements were fabricated by Griswold using forged letters as evidence and it was denounced by those who knew Poe, including Sarah Helen Whitman, Charles Frederick Briggs, and George Rex Graham. In March, Graham published a notice in his magazine accusing Griswold of betraying trust and taking revenge on the dead. "Mr. Griswold", he wrote, "has allowed old prejudices and old enmities to steal ... into the coloring of his picture." Thomas Holley Chivers wrote a book called New Life of Edgar Allan Poe which directly responded to Griswold's accusations. He said that Griswold "is not only incompetent to Edit any of [Poe's] works, but totally unconscious of the duties which he and every man who sets himself up as a Literary Executor, owe the dead".

Today Griswold's name is usually associated with Poe's as a character assassin, but not all believe that Griswold deliberately intended to cause harm. Some of the information that Griswold asserted or implied was that Poe was expelled from the University of Virginia and that Poe had tried to seduce his guardian John Allan's second wife. Even so, Griswold's attempts only drew attention to Poe's work; readers were thrilled at the idea of reading the works of an "evil" man. Griswold's characterization of Poe and the false information he originated appeared consistently in Poe biographies for the next two decades.

== Bibliography ==
Anthologies

- Biographical Annual (1841)
- The Poets and Poetry of America (1842, first of several editions)
- Gems from American Female Poets (1842)
- Readings in American Poetry for the Use of Schools (1843)
- Curiosities of American Literature (1844)
- The Poets and Poetry of England in the Nineteenth Century (1844)
- The Prose Works of John Milton (1845)
- The Poets and Poetry of England (1845)
- Poetry of the Sentiments (1846)
- Scenes in the Life of the Savior (1846)
- Prose Writers of America (1847)
- Female Poets of America (1848)
- The Sacred Poets of England and America (1848)
- Gift Leaves of American Poetry (1849)
- Poetry of the Flowers (1850)
- The Gift of Affection (1853)
- Gift of Flowers, or Love's Wreath (1853)
- Gift of Love (1853)
- Gift of Sentiment (1854)

Poetry

- The Cypress Wreath: A Book of Consolation (1844)
- Illustrated Book of Christian Ballads (1844)

Nonfiction

- The Republican Court or, American Society in the Days of Washington (1854)
