= William Bittner =

American academic

William Robert Bittner (1922 – 1977) was an American academic who specialized in American literature.

After studying at the State Teachers College in Lock Haven and the University of Pennsylvania, he taught at a variety of universities across the United States and Europe. He published hundreds of magazine articles and several works on literary figures like Waldo Frank and Edgar Allan Poe.

== Early life and education ==
William Robert Bittner was born in 1922, the son of John E. Bittner, Sr. and Alice G. Kane Bittner and brother of John E. Bittner, Jr. He was raised in Lock Haven, Pennsylvania, graduating from its high school in 1938.

In 1942, he was a student at the State Teachers College in Lock Haven. That year, he published a poem titled "Corporal Cloud, Before Battle" in the college's literary journal The Crucible and won an annual student poetry competition hosted by The Atlantic Monthly. He was editor of the College Times newspaper and a members of the College Players, performing in plays including Watch on the Rhine. He also wrote his own plays to be performed. Bittner graduated from the school in 1943. After graduating, he served in the military during World War II.

In 1949, he studied at the University of Pennsylvania's graduate school and taught in the university's Wharton School. He received a PhD from the University of Pennsylvania in June 1955.

== Academic career ==
Prior to September 1955, Bittner was a teacher at The New School for Social Research in New York City. He also previously taught at Rutgers University and the University of Delaware.

In September 1955, Bittner joined the faculty of Paterson State Teachers College as an instructor in English.

In 1958, Bittner was working as an assistant professor of English at Fairleigh Dickinson University in New Jersey. He also taught at the Free University of Berlin and was a Fulbright Professor in France, speaking French and German fluently. In 1964, he began serving as chair of the English department at Wesleyan College.

== Writing career ==
In 1958, Bittner published a work on the writer Waldo Frank, titled The Novels of Waldo Frank. In preparation for the book, he communicated with Frank and studied his manuscript collection held by the University of Pennsylvania.

By June 1958, Bittner had received a research grant to begin writing a biography on Edgar Allan Poe. It was stated that the work "may present Poe in a more sympathetic light". His biography of Poe was published in 1962 under the title Poe: A Biography. The book was criticised by Thomas Ollive Mabbott who wrote that it was "an extraordinarily careless book" and that there was "little new save pure fiction" contained within it. Leon Howard of the University of California, Los Angeles praised Bittner's skills in writing a "readable and sane biography" but was critical of his lack of literary awareness.

By June 1964, Bittner had published hundreds of articles in magazines including Saturday Review, The Nation, The New Republic and The Georgia Review.

== Personal life ==
Prior to July 1958, Bittner married fellow State Teachers College graduate Alice June Holmer.

Bittner died in 1977.
