= Sarah Helen Whitman =

American poet (1803–1878)

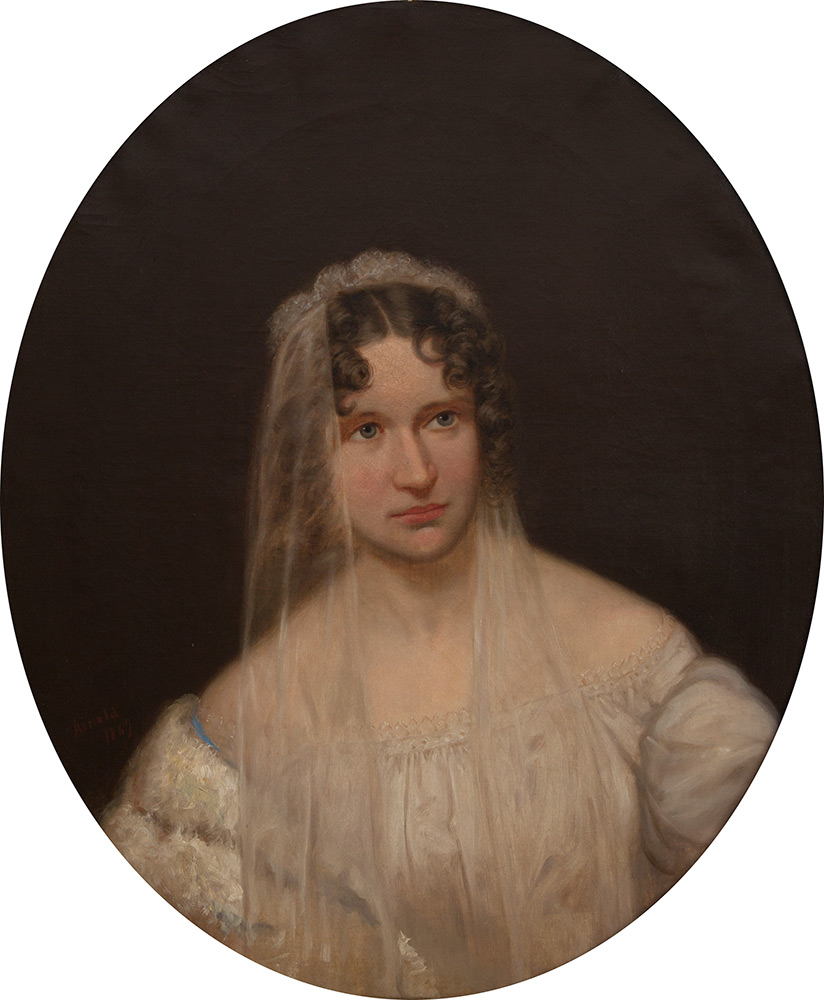
- Sarah Helen Whitman, painted by John Nelson Arnold, after an original painting by Cephas Giovanni Thompson
- Born: Sarah Helen Power; January 19, 1803; Providence, Rhode Island, U.S.
- Died: June 27, 1878 (aged 75); Providence, Rhode Island, U.S.
- Occupations: Poet, essayist
- Spouse: John Winslow Whitman (m. 1828; died 1833)

Sarah Helen Power Whitman (January 19, 1803 – June 27, 1878) was an American poet, essayist, transcendentalist, spiritualist and a romantic interest of Edgar Allan Poe.

== Early life ==
Whitman was born in Providence, Rhode Island on January 19, 1803, exactly six years before Poe's birth. She was the daughter of Nicholas Power and Anna Marsh. In 1828, she married the poet and writer John Winslow Whitman. John had been co-editor of the Boston Spectator and Ladies' Album, which allowed Sarah to publish some of her poetry using the name "Helen". John died in 1833; he and Sarah never had children.

Sarah Helen Whitman had a heart condition that she treated with ether she breathed in through her handkerchief.

Whitman was friends with Margaret Fuller and other intellectuals in New England. She became interested in transcendentalism through this social group and after hearing Ralph Waldo Emerson lecture in Boston, Massachusetts and in Providence. She also became interested in science, mesmerism, and the occult. She had a penchant for wearing black and a coffin-shaped charm around her neck and may have practiced séances in her home on Sundays, attempting to communicate with the dead.

== Relationship with Edgar Allan Poe ==
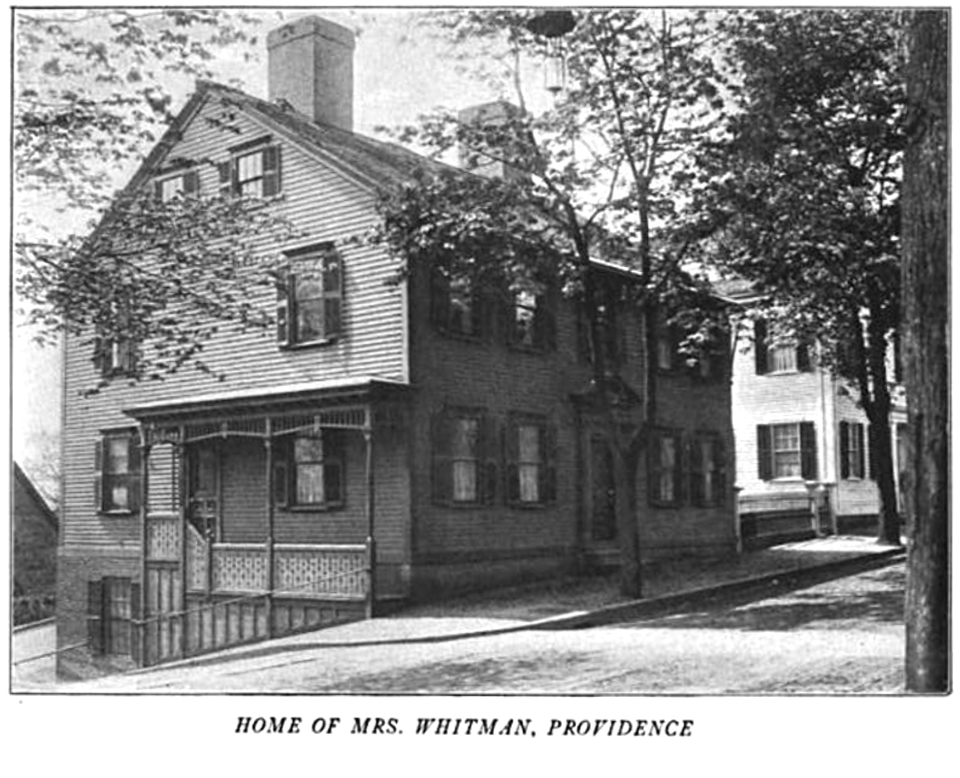
Whitman house Providence

Whitman and Edgar Allan Poe first crossed paths in Providence in July 1845. Poe was attending a lecture by friend and poet Frances Sargent Osgood. As Poe and Osgood walked, they passed the home of Whitman while she was standing in the rose garden behind her house. Poe declined to be introduced to her. By this time, Whitman was already an admirer of Poe's stories. She admitted to her friend Mary E. Hewitt:

I can never forget the impressions I felt in reading a story of his for the first time... I experienced a sensation of such intense horror that I dared neither look at anything he had written nor even utter his name... By degrees this terror took the character of fascination—I devoured with a half-reluctant and fearful avidity every line that fell from his pen.

A friend, Annie Lynch, had asked Whitman to write a poem for a Valentine's Day party in 1848. She agreed, and wrote one for Poe, though he was not in attendance. Poe heard about the tribute, "To Edgar Allan Poe," and returned the favor by anonymously sending his previously printed poem "To Helen". Whitman may not have known it was from Poe himself, and she did not respond. Three months later, Poe wrote her an entirely new poem, "To Helen," referencing the moment from several years earlier where Poe first saw her in the rose garden behind her house.

Poe was on his way to see Whitman at the time of his alleged suicide attempt. Before boarding a train to Boston from Lowell, Massachusetts on his way to Providence, he took two doses of laudanum. By the time he arrived in Boston he was very sick and close to death. He spent four days in Providence with her immediately after. Though they shared a common interest in literature, Poe was concerned about Whitman's friends, though he had little regard for many of them, including Elizabeth F. Ellet, Margaret Fuller, and several other Transcendentalists. He said to her, "My heart is heavy, Helen, for I see that your friends are not my own."

The two exchanged letters and poetry for some time before discussing engagement. After Poe lectured in Providence in December 1848, reciting a poem by Edward Coote Pinkney directly to Whitman, she agreed to an "immediate marriage". Poe agreed to remain sober during their engagement — a vow he violated within only a few days. Whitman's mother discovered that Poe was also pursuing Annie Richmond and childhood sweetheart Sarah Elmira Royster. Even so, the wedding had come so close to occurring that, in January 1849, a newspaper in New London, Connecticut and others announced their union and wished them well. At one point, they chose the wedding date of December 25, 1848, despite criticism of the relationship from friends and enemies alike. Whitman supposedly received an anonymous letter while she was at the library suggesting that Poe had broken his vow to her to stay sober, directly leading to an end of the relationship. Poe said in a letter to Whitman (addressed "Dear Madam") that he blamed her mother for their split. Rufus Wilmot Griswold, Poe's infamous first biographer, claimed that Poe purposely ended his relationship with Whitman the day before their wedding by committing unnamed drunken "outrages" that, as he wrote in his biography, "made necessary a summons of the police".

== Later life ==
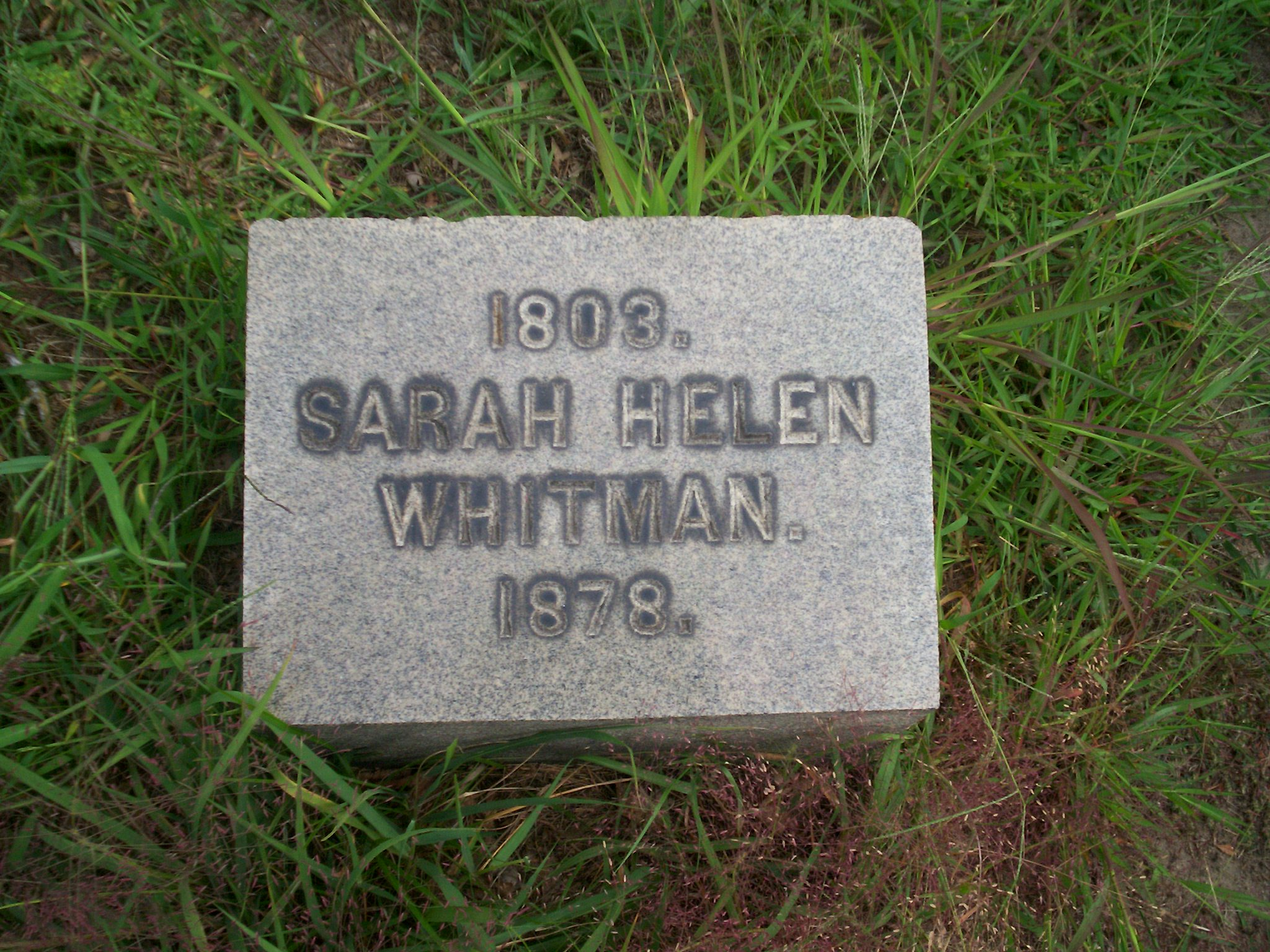
Grave of Sarah Helen Whitman

Whitman's collection Hours of Life, and Other Poems was published in 1853. In 1860, eleven years after his death, she published a work in defense of Poe against his critics, aimed especially at Rufus Griswold, entitled Edgar Allan Poe and His Critics. A Baltimore newspaper said the book was a noble effort "but it does not wipe out the... dishonorable records in the biography of Dr. Griswold." The work likely inspired William Douglas O'Connor to write The Good Gray Poet, a similar defense of Walt Whitman, published in 1866. She corresponded with Poe's English biographer, John Henry Ingram, who added her letters from Poe and a daguerreotype portrait to the library of material he was assembling; Ingram's Poe collection is now held at the Alderman Library at the University of Virginia.

Sarah Helen Whitman died at the age of 75 on June 27, 1878 at the home of a friend at 133 Brown St (then 97 Bowen St.) in Providence, Rhode Island, and is buried in the North Burial Ground. In her will, she used the bulk of her estate to publish a volume of her own poetry and that of her sister. She also left money to the Providence Association for the Benefit of Colored Children and the Rhode Island Society for the Prevention of Cruelty to Animals.
