= Polyanthos (magazine) =

The Polyanthos was a monthly literary magazine published in Boston, Massachusetts, by Joseph Tinker Buckingham from December 1805 – September 1814.

== The magazine ==
The magazine was founded in 1805 by Joseph Tinker Buckingham and featured a large number of contributors of essays, biographical articles and other literature, such as Wilkes Allen, Rev. John Eliot (of New North Church), John Lathrop, Jr., Samuel Louder, John Lovering, John Randall, Solomon Stoddard, Royall Tyler, Samuel A. Wells, and Rufus Wyman. Buckingham also wrote theatre reviews in each issue.

Buckingham had very strong views on nationalism and "against anything he felt to be false," and these view were reflected in the magazine. The first issue of The Polyanthos featured a biography of Samuel Harris, a review of the poem "Monody on the Victims and Sufferers by the Late Conflagration in Richmond, Virginia," a long essay on the alphabet, and "eleven paragraph-length bits which Buckingham apparently wished known as essays."

The Polyanthos gave special attention to the theater, with the magazine called "a journal of no small literary merit for that day, and which devoted particular attention to the New England stage. The theatrical notes in The Polyanthos are considered among the most valuable of that period.

Most issues featured "excellent portraits" and engravings, such as a portrait by Samuel Harris (ca.1784-1810) or a song. The magazine ceased in 1814 "for the ungrateful or undiscerning public, — notwithstanding the expressed flattery of their taste and confidence in their liberality, — suffered it to wither and die."

== Connection with Edgar Allan Poe ==
In 1807 Polyanthos was involved in an incident with American actor David Poe Jr. and English-born actress Elizabeth Arnold Hopkins Poe, the parents of Edgar Allan Poe.

Initially Buckingham was supportive of the Poes in his magazine, but later critiqued the actors by writing that "Mrs. Poe was a green Little Pickle. We never knew before that the Spoiled Child belonged to that class of being termed hermaphroditical, as the uncouthness of his costume seemed to indicate." Buckingham also attacked David Poe Jr., saying "Of Mr. Poe's Barnwell we expected little satisfaction, and of course were not disappointed."

David Poe Jr. was enraged at the comments and confronted Buckingham. In Buckingham's memoirs, he noted how the actor "Mr. Poe — the father of ... Edgar A. Poe, — took offence at a remark (in the magazine) on his wife's acting, and called at my house to 'chastise my impertinence,' but went away without effecting his purpose. Both he and his wife were performers of considerable merit, but somewhat vain of their personal accomplishments."

According to a 1931 issue of Publishers Weekly, this incident alone "merits at least footnote immortality" for the magazine.

== Images ==
Published in Polyanthos

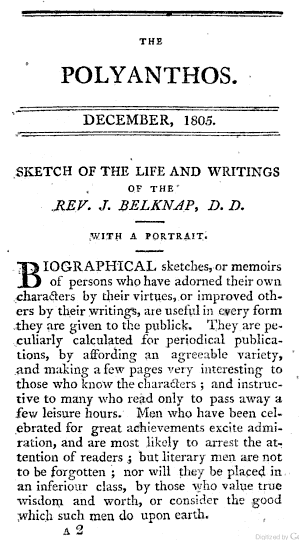
Polyanthos no.1, December 1805; published by J.T. Buckingham, Winter Street, Boston

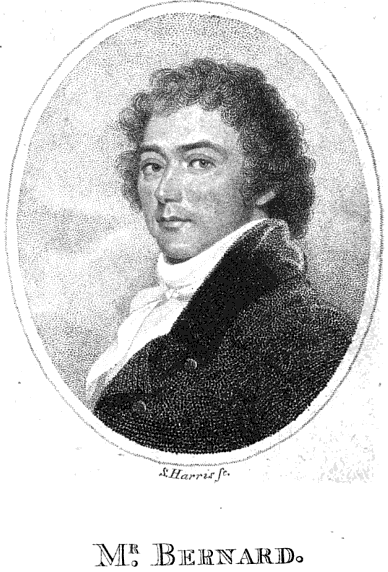
Actor John Bernard, 1806

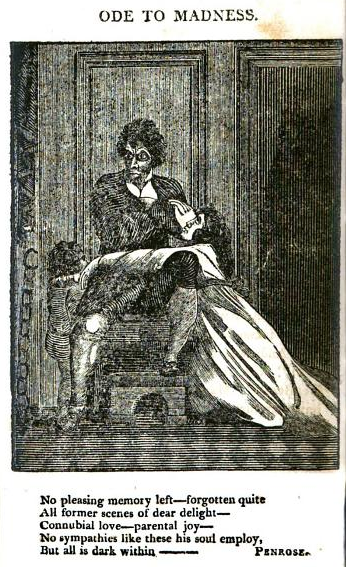
Illustration to Thomas Penrose's "Ode to Madness," 1812

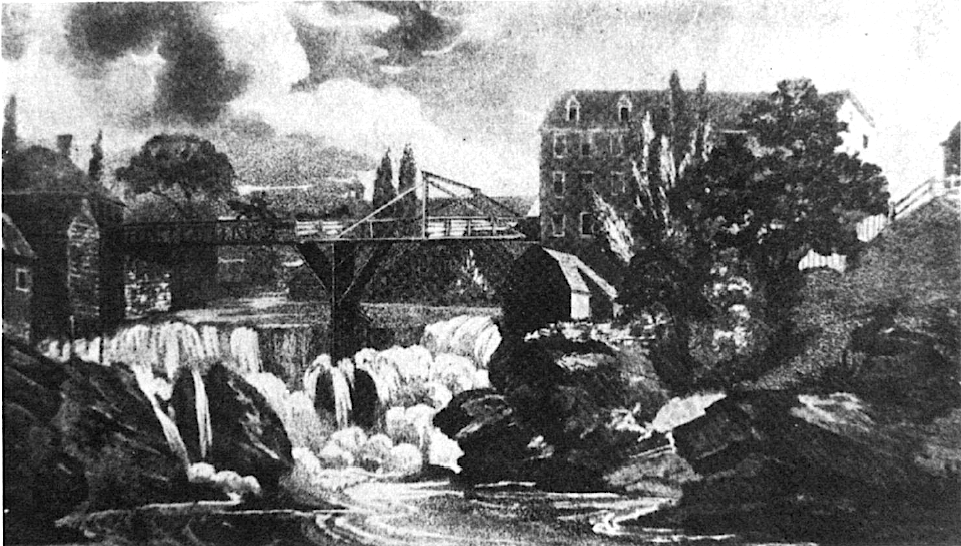
Pawtucket Falls, Rhode Island, 1812

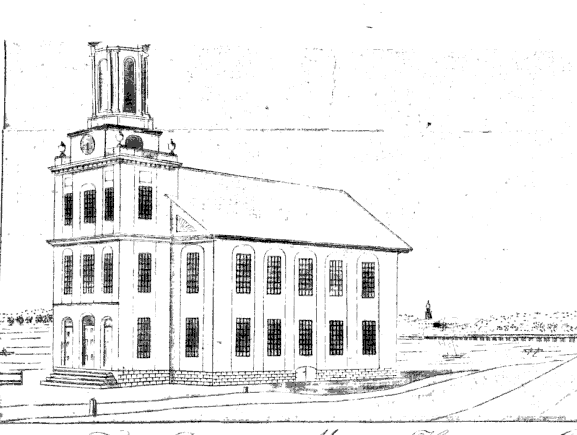
Charles Street Meeting House, Boston, 1813

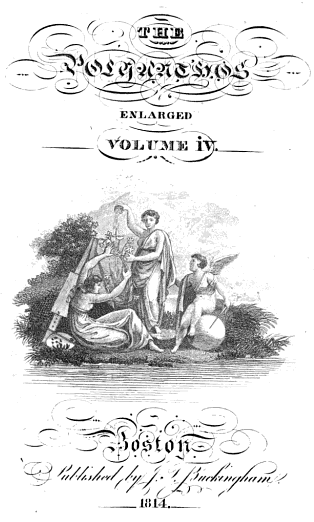
The Polyanthos new series v.4, 1814

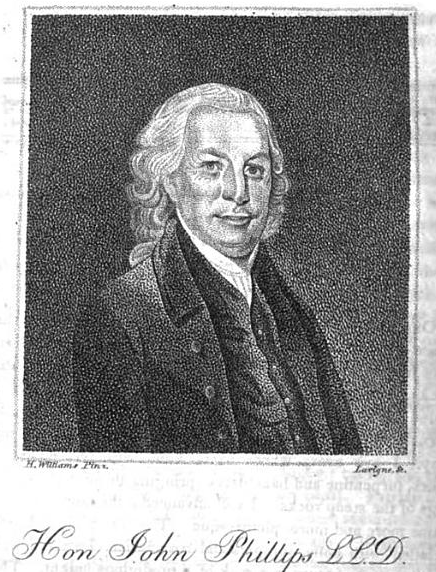
John Phillips, 1814

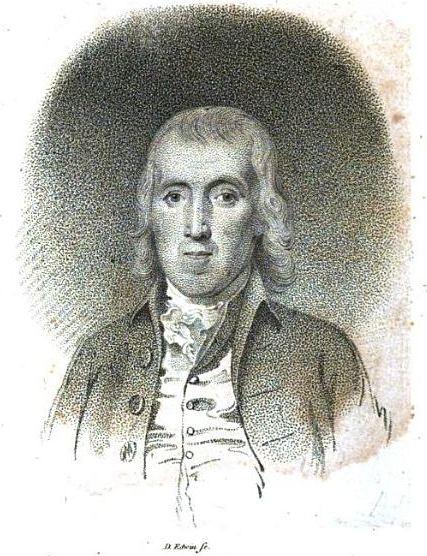
David Rittenhouse, 1814

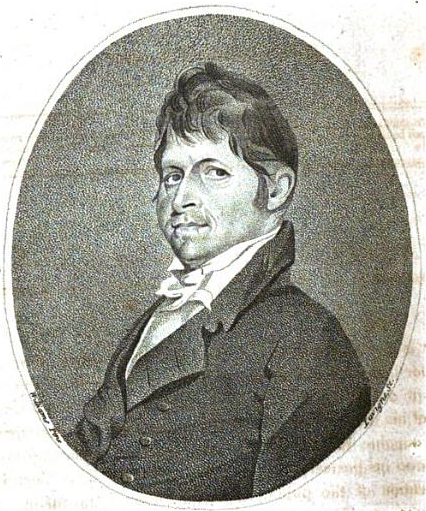
William Ingalls M.D., 1814

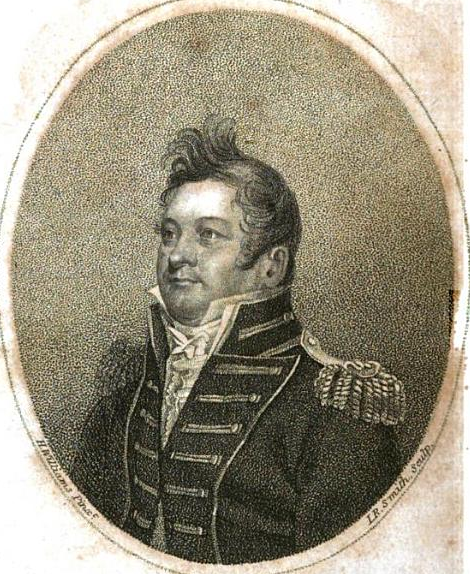
Isaac Hull, 1814
