= Edgar Allan Poe Museum (Richmond, Virginia) =

Historic house in Virginia, United States

Poe Museum
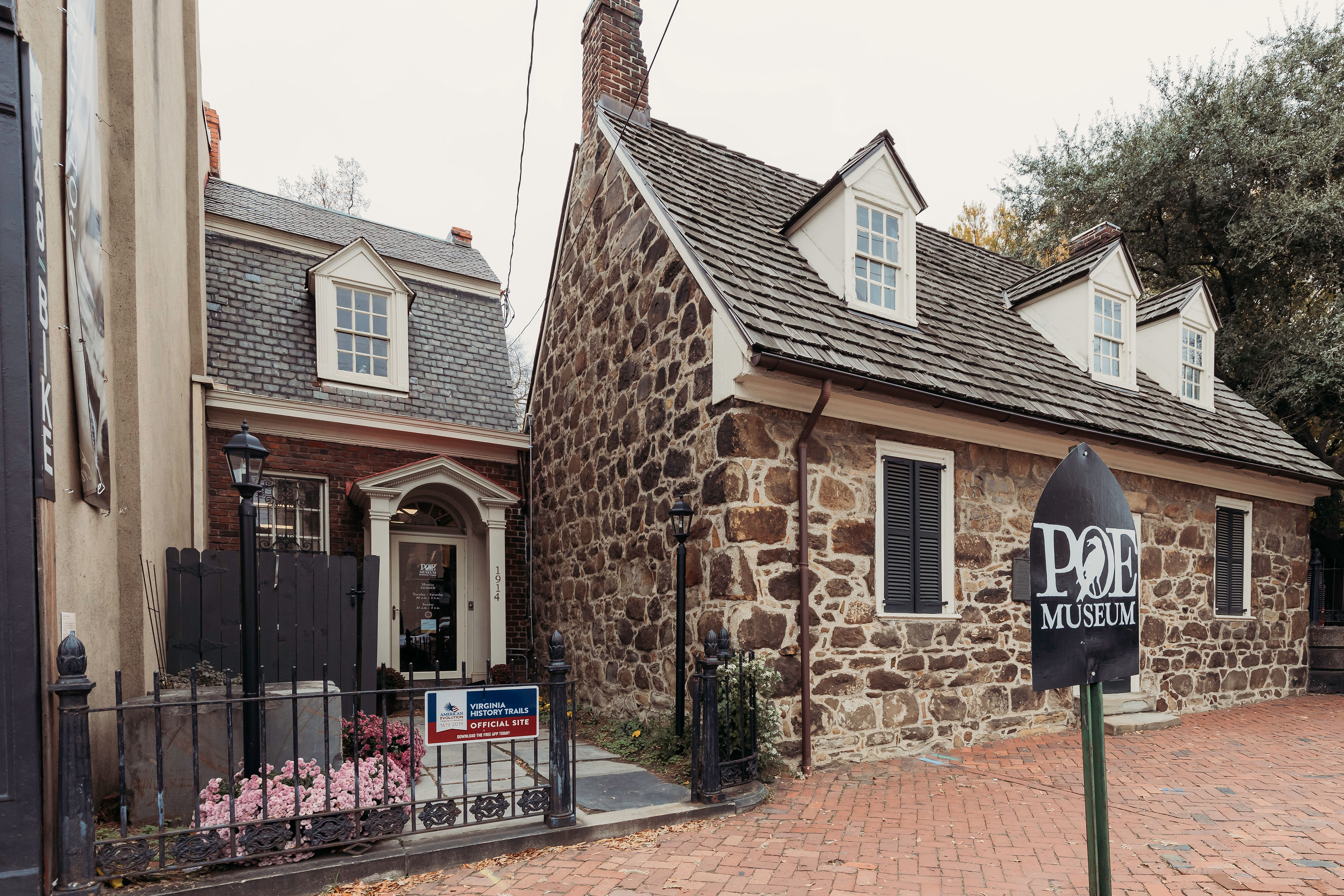
- Entrance to the museum in July 2020
- Established: 1922
- Location: 1914 E. Main St., Richmond, Virginia, U.S.
- Coordinates: 37°31′56″N 77°25′34″W
- Type: Biographical museum
- Director: Maeve Jones
- President: Adam Worcester
- Curator: Chris Semtner
- Website: poemuseum.org
- Old Stone House
- U.S. National Register of Historic Places
- Virginia Landmarks Register
- Richmond City Historic District
- Area: 0.4 acres (0.16 ha)
- Built: 1750
- Architectural style: Colonial
- NRHP reference No.: 73002222
- VLR No.: 127-0100

Significant dates
- Added to NRHP: November 14, 1973
- Designated VLR: October 16, 1973

The Poe Museum or the Edgar Allan Poe Museum, is a museum located in the Shockoe Bottom neighborhood of Richmond, Virginia, United States, dedicated to American writer Edgar Allan Poe. Though Poe never lived in the building, it serves to commemorate his time living in Richmond. The museum holds one of the world's largest collections of original manuscripts, letters, first editions, memorabilia and personal belongings. The museum also provides an overview of early 19th century Richmond, where Poe lived and worked. The museum features the life and career of Poe by documenting his accomplishments with pictures, relics, and verse, and focusing on his many years in Richmond.

== Old Stone House ==
The Poe Museum is located at the "Old Stone House", built circa 1740 and cited as the oldest original residential building in Richmond. It was built by Jacob Ege, who immigrated from Germany to Philadelphia in 1738 and came to the James River Settlements and Col. Wm. Byrd's land grant (now known as Richmond) in the company of the family of his fiancée, Maria Dorothea Scheerer, whom he later married; the house was a "Home for the Bride". (One of Jacob's nephews, George Ege, was a member of the U.S. House of Representatives from Berks County, Pennsylvania.) Dendrochronology suggests that additional construction on the house occurred in 1754. Jacob Ege died in 1762. Samuel Ege, the son of Jacob and a Richmond flour inspector, owned the house in 1782 when it first appeared on a tax register.

In 1824, when the Marquis de Lafayette revisited Richmond, a volunteer company of young Richmonders, the Junior Morgan Riflemen, rode in procession along Lafayette's carriage. One of the riflemen, the then 15-year-old Edgar Allan Poe, stood as honorguard outside the Ege house as Lafayette visited its inhabitants. The house remained in possession of the Ege family until 1911.

== Museum history ==
Amidst Poe's centennial in 1909, a group of Richmond residents campaigned for the city to better recognize the writer. Citizens asked the city council to erect a statue of Poe on Monument Avenue, but were turned down because he was deemed a disreputable character. The same group went on to found the Poe Museum. The New York Times called 1909 a banner year for acknowledgement of the importance of Poe, mentioning the Richmond museum. In 1911, Preservation Virginia (formerly known as the Association for the Preservation of Virginia Antiquities) saved the house and opened it in 1922 as the Old Stone House.

The museum is only blocks away from the sites of Poe's Richmond homes and place of employment, the Southern Literary Messenger. It is also a few blocks from the grave of his mother Eliza Poe who was buried in Richmond's Church Hill neighborhood, in the graveyard of St John's Church. Poe never lived in this home. Its completion, originally as the "Edgar Allan Poe Shrine", was announced on October 7, 1921:

This day... at a first expense of about $20,000, completes the Edgar Allan Poe Shrine, and marks the seventy-second anniversary of the death of the poet. If he is aware of mundane affairs he must be pleased to find that, at length, there has been reared to his memory a lasting and appropriate memorial.

Actor Vincent Price, who had played in numerous film roles based on Poe stories, was a noted fan of the author. He visited the museum in 1975 and had his photo taken with the museum's renowned stuffed raven. In 2014, his daughter Victoria Price visited the museum, saying that Poe had been such a part of her life that she thought of him as her uncle. In 2016 Victoria Price returned to Richmond as part of a film festival featuring Poe films. The festival, in addition to a Poe Goes to the Movies Unhappy Hour with Victoria Price at the Poe Museum, presented films at Richmond's historic Byrd Theatre and An Evening with Victoria Price at the Cultural Arts Center in Glen Allen, Virginia.

== Exhibits ==
The Poe Museum's three buildings contain exhibits focusing on different aspects of the author's life and legacy. The parlor of the Old Stone House is used for the display of furniture from the homes in which Edgar Poe and his sister Rosalie Mackenzie Poe lived. Of special interest in this room is a piano that once belonged to Poe's sister and Edgar's childhood bed.

The Elizabeth Arnold Poe Memorial Building includes many first and early editions of Poe's works including an 1845 publication of "The Raven" and one of only 12 known existing copies of Poe's first collection Tamerlane and Other Poems. Manuscripts and rare early daguerreotypes and portraits are also exhibited there.

The North Building is dedicated to exploring Poe's mysterious death. Among the highlights of the collection displayed are Poe's vest, trunk, walking stick and a lock of his hair. There are over 26 published theories on Poe's death, but the museum postulates that the 19th century practice of Cooping could have been a contributor to his death.

A courtyard area behind the museum includes a garden inspired by Poe's poem "To One in Paradise." The Enchanted Garden has a fountain, a shrine, and several gardens inspired by Poe's writing, such as a rock inscribed with a character's name from "A Tale of The Ragged Mountains" and a brick wall similar to the one described in "William Wilson." The garden is also home to the two resident cats, Edgar and Pluto. The two black cats were found as stray kittens behind the Shrine and have lived at the museum ever since. This space is also available for weddings.

== See also ==
- Edgar Allan Poe House and Museum in Baltimore, Maryland
- Edgar Allan Poe National Historic Site in Philadelphia, Pennsylvania
- Edgar Allan Poe Cottage in The Bronx, New York
