= Senator Buckingham (disambiguation) =

William Alfred Buckingham (1804–1875) was a U.S. Senator from Connecticut from 1869 to 1875. Senator Buckingham may also refer to:

- Dawn Buckingham (born 1960s), Texas State Senate
- Joseph T. Buckingham (1779–1861), Massachusetts State Senate
