= Henry Poe =

American sailor and poet (1807–1831)

- Born: William Henry Leonard Poe; 30 January 1807; Boston, Massachusetts, U.S.
- Died: 1 August 1831 (aged 24); Baltimore, Maryland, U.S.
- Occupations: Sailor; clerk; writer
- Parents: David Poe Jr.; Elizabeth Arnold
- Relatives: Edgar Allan Poe (brother); Rosalie Mackenzie Poe (sister)

William Henry Leonard Poe, often referred to as Henry Poe (January 30, 1807 – August 1, 1831), was an American sailor, amateur poet and the brother of Edgar Allan Poe and Rosalie Poe.

After the death of their parents, the three Poe children were split up: Henry lived with his grandparents in Baltimore, Maryland, while Edgar and Rosalie were cared for by two different families in Richmond, Virginia. Before the age of 20, Henry traveled around the globe by sea before returning to Baltimore and becoming a published poet and author. One of his works, The Pirate, was a fictionalized account of his brother's first relationship with Sarah Elmira Royster in Richmond. Henry died of tuberculosis in 1831 at the age of 24.

Henry Poe was an inspiration to his brother's life and writings and the two had similar writing styles. Edgar Allan Poe for a time used the alias "Henri Le Rennet", a name inspired by Henry. Henry's influence on Edgar's writing includes a character in the novel The Narrative of Arthur Gordon Pym of Nantucket and possibly the name of the title character in the poem "Lenore".

== Biography ==
Poe and Clemm family tree

William Henry Leonard, who went by the name Henry, was born circa January 30, 1807, to traveling actors Eliza Poe and David Poe, Jr., four months after their troupe began performing in Boston. Their second son, Edgar, was born on January 19, 1809, and a daughter, Rosalie, was born in December 1810. Some time before July 1809, however, David Poe had deserted his family, though little is known about his disappearance. He may have died in Norfolk, Virginia on December 11, 1811." Eliza Poe died of tuberculosis on December 8, 1811, leaving her three children as orphans.

During their mother's illness, Henry had been left in the care of his paternal grandparents, while Edgar and Rosalie had been cared for by actor friends of their parents, namely Mr. and Mrs. Luke Usher. The children were likely at Eliza's side as she died. In one of his poems, Henry described her "long... last farewell" to them and was given a lock of her hair to remember her. After the death of Eliza, the three children were split up. Henry went back to his grandparents in Baltimore, while Edgar went to live with a foster family, the Allans of Richmond. Rosalie was adopted by the Mackenzies, also of Richmond.

Henry was raised by his grandparents, Elizabeth Cairnes Poe and David Poe, Sr. David Poe, Sr. had been a quartermaster in the American Revolutionary War and paid for supplies out of his own pocket, including $500 for clothing for the troops. His commitment had earned the respect and friendship of the Marquis de LaFayette and the honorary title of "General". David Poe, Sr. died in 1816, and his wife, Elizabeth Cairnes Poe, though sickly and bedridden, outlived her grandson and died on July 7, 1835.

Henry kept in touch with his younger brother Edgar sporadically as they grew up, often through letters but once he even visited Edgar in Richmond in the 1820s. There, Edgar introduced his brother to his childhood sweetheart, Sarah Elmira Royster. Edgar's foster-father John Allan also corresponded with Henry. In one letter, dated November 1, 1824, Allan apologized that Edgar was slow in writing a letter to Henry, complaining that his foster-son "had little else to do, for he does nothing... The boy possesses not a Spark of affection for us, not a particle of gratitude for all my care and kindness towards him."

Before the age of twenty, Henry served in South America and elsewhere on board the USS Macedonian. As a crewman aboard the Macedonian, a frigate, he also visited the West Indies, the Mediterranean, and Russia. In 1827, he returned to Baltimore to live with his grandmother, his aunt Maria Clemm, and his two cousins Henry Clemm and Virginia Clemm. Around this time, Henry was described as a "slim, feeble, young man with dark inexpressive eyes" who possessed a "singular personal beauty".

=== Writings ===
In Baltimore, while working at a law office, Henry developed his interest in writing. He wrote verse inspired by Lord Byron into the albums of local young women and gave recitations. The May 19, 1827 issue of Baltimore's North American, or, Weekly Journal of Politics, Science, and Literature published Henry's "Dreams", a poem which laments the difference between the dream world and reality. The October 27 issue of the same periodical published Henry's short story "The Pirate", a fictionalization of his brother's love affair with Royster. The main character was named Edgar Leonard, a combination of the names of the two brothers, who pursues a woman named Rosalie, a name borrowed from their sister. The Edgar Leonard character says: "I lost my parents at an early age... and was left to the care of a relation."

One of Henry's poems, titled "Original", was virtually identical to one of Edgar's early poems published in Tamerlane and Other Poems, now known as "The Happiest Day, The Happiest Hour". It is likely that this poem and another called "Dreams" were Edgar's and incorrectly credited to Henry. Edgar wrote "The Happiest Day, The Happiest Hour" while he was serving in the Army. He sent the poem to Henry, who had it published in the September 15, 1827, issue of the North American, which included Henry's name.

Another poem published by Henry was "Lines on a Pocket Book", in which he considers John Allan's accusations that younger sister Rosalie Poe was illegitimate. Henry's poems generally have themes of melancholy, despair, and feature women who die and abandon their loved ones who dream of their reunion. Many are so similar to Poe's early work that they may have been collaborative efforts. His writing career ended in 1827 when the North American Review ceased publication.

=== Death ===
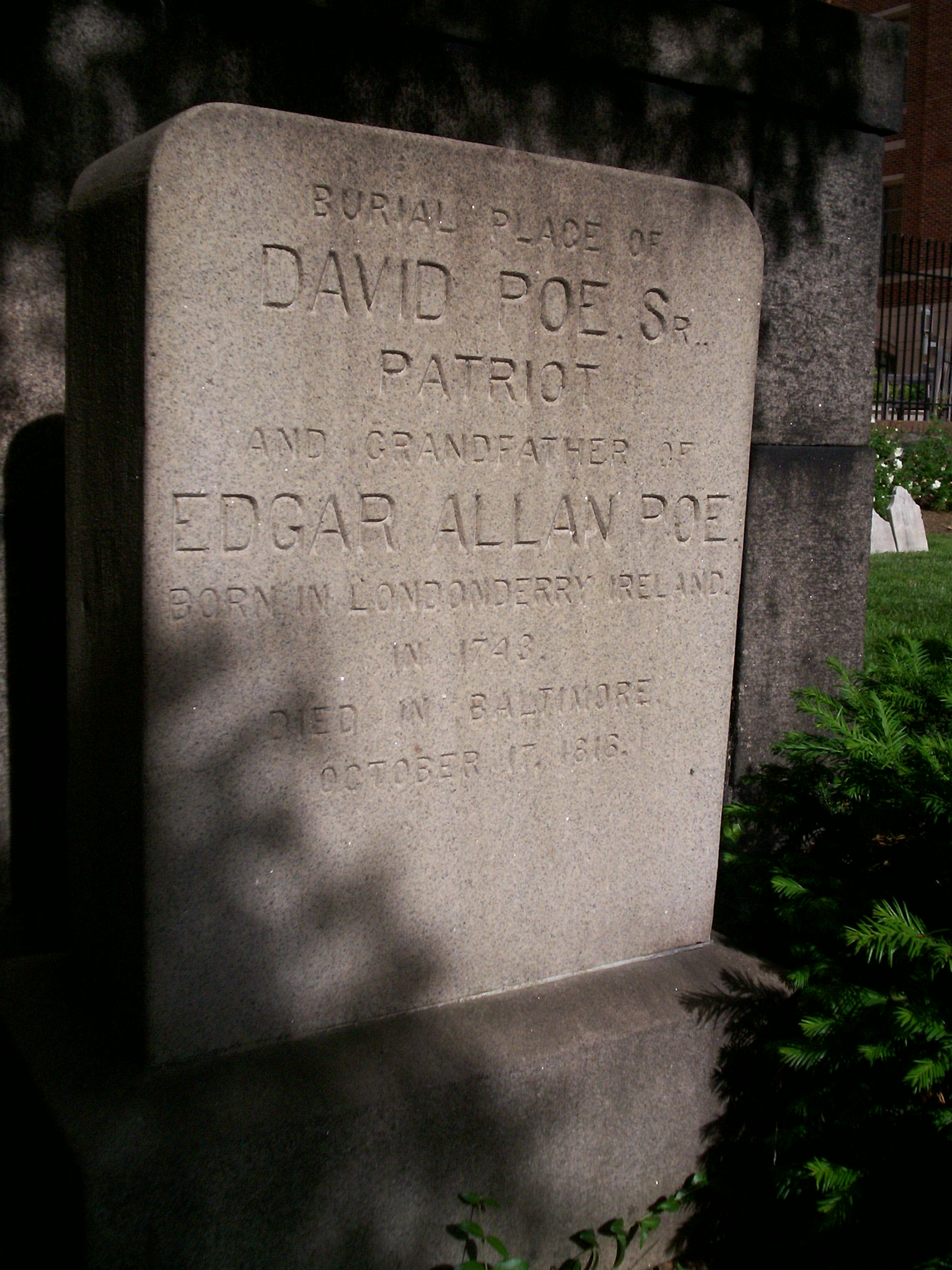
This stone marks the Poe family plot at Westminster Hall and Burying Ground, where David Poe, Sr. and William Henry Leonard Poe are buried.

Henry, who was a heavy drinker and may have been an alcoholic, died of tuberculosis on August 1, 1831, in Baltimore, likely in the same room or even the same bed which he shared with his brother Edgar. He was twenty-four. Henry was buried at what is now Westminster Hall and Burying Ground, where his brother would be buried several years later. Henry's obituary misspelled his name as "W. H. Hope".

== Influence ==
Edgar Allan Poe was very close to his brother, as he wrote: "there can be no tie more strong than that of brother for brother — it is not so much that they love one another as that they both love the same parent."

Edgar occasionally used the alias "Henri Le Rennet", a French version of his older brother's name. He was also inspired by his brother Henry's travels, often incorporating some of his stories from overseas into tellings of his own life story. The character of August Barnard in Edgar's novel, The Narrative of Arthur Gordon Pym of Nantucket (1838), seems to be inspired by Henry, especially in his travels across the sea and his drinking. Poe may have also transformed his brother's name into the title character in his poem "Lenore".
