= To Helen =

Poem by Edgar Allan Poe

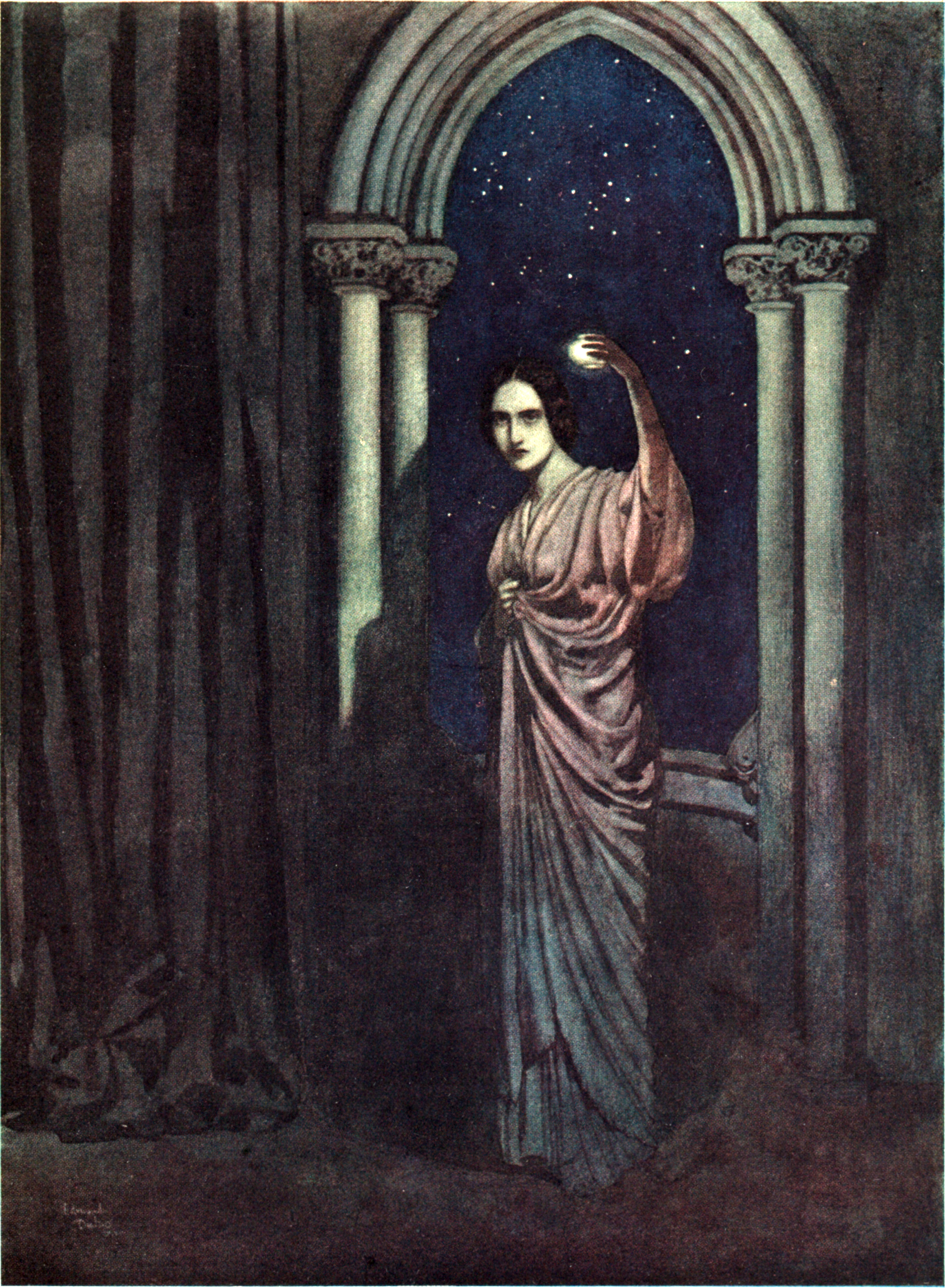
Illustration by Edmund Dulac, 1912

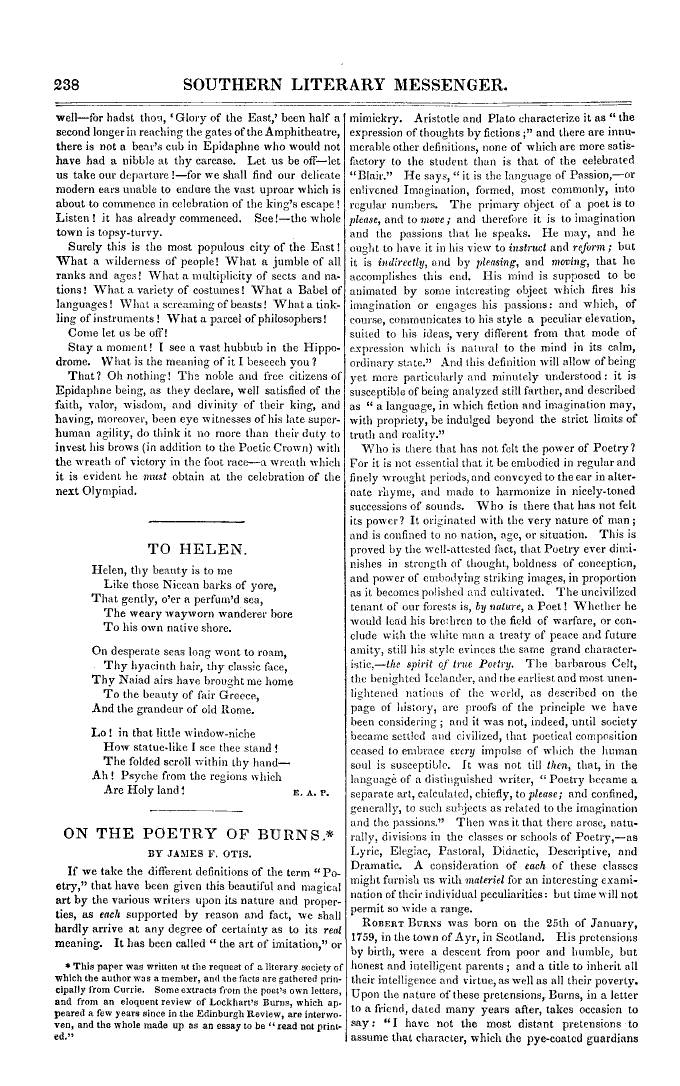
"To Helen" in the March 1836 Southern Literary Messenger, Volume 2, Number 4, bound volume, page 238.

"To Helen" is the first of two poems to carry that name written by Edgar Allan Poe. The 15-line poem was written in honor of Jane Stanard, the mother of a childhood friend. It was first published in the 1831 collection Poems of Edgar A. Poe. It was subsequently reprinted in the March 1836 issue of the Southern Literary Messenger. The final, revised version appeared in the 1845 collection The Raven and Other Poems.

== Analysis ==
In "To Helen", Poe is celebrating the nurturing power of woman. Poe was inspired in part by Samuel Taylor Coleridge, particularly in the second line ("Like those Nicean barks of yore") which resembles a line in Coleridge's "Youth and Age" ("Like those trim skiffs, unknown of yore").

Poe revised the poem in 1845, making several improvements, most notably changing "the beauty of fair Greece, and the grandeur of old Rome" to "the glory that was Greece and the grandeur that was Rome." Poe biographer Jeffrey Meyers referred to these as "two of Poe's finest and most famous lines".

=== Allusions ===
In referring to Helen, Poe is alluding to Helen of Troy who is considered to be the most beautiful woman who ever lived — according to the goddess Venus in the myth referred to as The Judgement of Paris. Helen of Troy was Christopher Marlowe's "face that launch'd a thousand ships" such as the "Nicean barks" of Poe's poem. Poe also refers to Helen as Psyche, a beautiful princess who became the lover of Cupid. Psyche represented the soul to ancient Greeks, and Poe is comparing Helen to the very soul of "regions which are Holy Land" meaning the soul of Greece from which so much of our ideals of beauty, democracy and learning sprang forth. In ancient Greek, the name Helen literally means "sunlight; bright as the dawn". Her "agate lamp" may refer to the moment when Psyche discovered the true identity of Cupid by shining a lamp on him at night; it also refers to the enlightened knowledge of the ancient world, which still influences Western culture today. Guy Davenport has asserted that Poe is "normally far more exact that he is given credit for":

Sappho, whom Poe is imitating, had compared a woman's beauty to a fleet of ships. Byron had previously written lines that Poe outbyrons Byron with, in "the glory that was Greece / And the grandeur that was Rome." But how is Helen also Psyche; who is the wanderer coming home? Scholars are not sure. In fact, the poem is not easy to defend against the strictures of critics. We can point out that Nicaean is not, as has been charged, a pretty bit of gibberish, but the adjective for the City of Nice, where a major shipworks was: Marc Antony's fleet was built there. We can defend perfumed sea, which has been called silly, by noting that classical ships never left sight of land, and could smell orchards on shore, that perfumed oil was an extensive industry in classical times and that ships laden with it would smell better than your shipload of sheep.

== Full poem ==
=== Original 1831 version ===
Helen, thy beauty is to me
Like those Nicean barks of yore,
That gently, o'er a perfum'd sea,
The weary way-worn wanderer bore
To his own native shore.

On desperate seas long wont to roam,
Thy hyacinth hair, thy classic face,
Thy Naiad airs have brought me home
To the beauty of fair Greece,
And the grandeur of old Rome.

Lo ! in that little window-niche
How statue-like I see thee stand!
The folded scroll within thy hand —
A Psyche from the regions which
Are Holy land !

=== Revised 1845 version ===
Helen, thy beauty is to me
Like those Nicean barks of yore
That gently, o'er a perfumed sea,
The weary, way-worn wanderer bore
To his own native shore.

On desperate seas long wont to roam,
Thy hyacinth hair, thy classic face,
Thy Naiad airs have brought me home
To the glory that was Greece,
And the grandeur that was Rome.

Lo, in yon brilliant window-niche
How statue-like I see thee stand,
The agate lamp within thy hand,
Ah! Psyche, from the regions which
Are Holy Land!

== In popular culture ==
- This poem possibly inspired "Banolata Sen"("বনলতা সেন") by 20th century Bengali poet Jibanananda Das.
- The poem is recited by Tom Hanks in the 2004 Coen Brothers film The Ladykillers.
- The poem is used by Dennis Barlow to seduce Aimée Thanatogenos in The Loved One by Evelyn Waugh
- The poem appears in the Richard Powers novel Galatea 2.2.
- The poem is cited in The new Atlantis by Ursula Kroeber Le Guin.
