= Edgar Allan Poe =

American writer and critic (1809–1849)

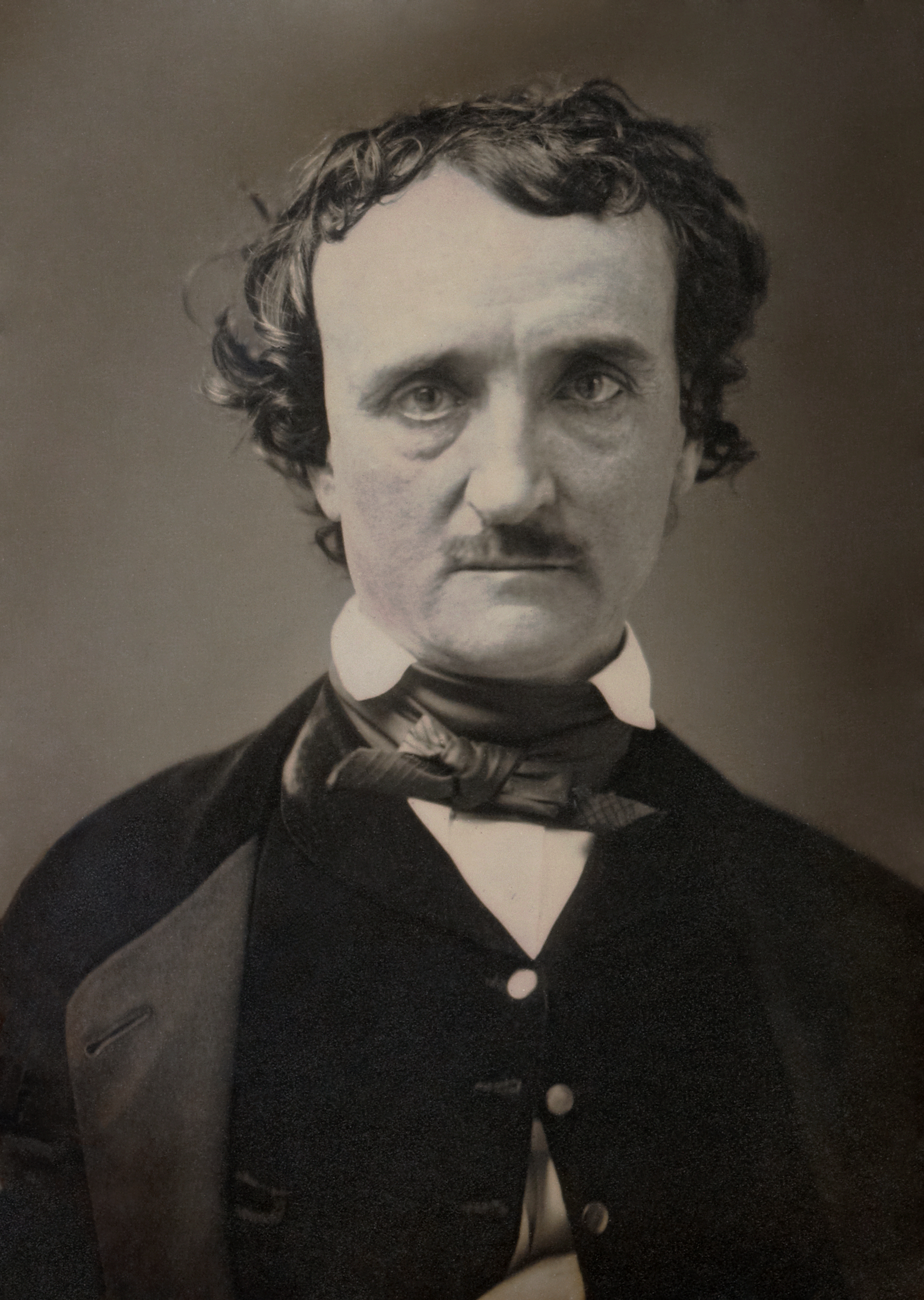
- Poe in 1849
- Born: Edgar Poe; January 19, 1809; Boston, Massachusetts, US
- Died: October 7, 1849 (aged 40); Baltimore, Maryland, US
- Resting place: Westminster Hall and Burying Ground
- Education: University of Virginia (dropped out)
- Occupations: Writer; poet; editor; literary critic
- Spouse: Virginia Clemm (m. 1836; died 1847)
- Parents: David Poe Jr.; Eliza Poe
- Relatives: Henry Poe (brother); Rosalie Poe (sister)
- Writing career
- Genres: Poetry; short story

Edgar Allan Poe (January 19, 1809 – October 7, 1849) was an American writer, poet, editor, and literary critic who is best known for his poetry and short stories, particularly his tales involving mystery and the macabre. He is widely regarded as one of the central figures of Romanticism and Gothic fiction in the United States and of early American literature.

Poe was one of the country's first successful practitioners of the short story, and is generally considered to be one of the pioneers of the detective fiction genre. In addition, he is credited with contributing significantly to the emergence of science fiction. He is the first well-known American writer to earn a living exclusively through writing, which resulted in a financially difficult life and career.

Poe was born in Boston. He was the second child of actors David and Eliza Poe. His father abandoned the family in 1810, and when Eliza died the following year, Poe was taken in by John and Frances Allan of Richmond, Virginia. They never formally adopted him, but he lived with them well into young adulthood.

Poe attended the University of Virginia, but left after only a year due to a lack of money. He frequently quarreled with John Allan over the funds needed to continue his education as well as his gambling debts. In 1827, having enlisted in the United States Army under the assumed name of Edgar A. Perry, he published his first collection, Tamerlane and Other Poems, which was credited only to "a Bostonian". Poe and Allan reached a temporary rapprochement after the death of Allan's wife, Frances, in 1829. However, Poe later failed as an officer cadet at West Point, declared his intention to become a writer, primarily of poems, and parted ways with Allan.

Poe switched his focus to prose and spent the next several years working for literary journals and periodicals, becoming known for his own style of literary criticism. His work forced him to move between several cities, including Baltimore, Philadelphia, and New York City. In 1836, when he was 27, he married his 13-year-old cousin, Virginia Clemm. She died of tuberculosis in 1847.

In January 1845, he published his poem "The Raven" to instant success. He planned for years to produce his own journal, The Penn, later renamed The Stylus – but before it began publishing, Poe died in Baltimore in 1849, aged 40, under mysterious circumstances. The cause of his death remains unknown and has been attributed to many causes, including disease, alcoholism, substance abuse, and suicide.

Poe's works influenced the development of literature throughout the world and even impacted such specialized fields as cosmology and cryptography. Since his death, he and his writings have appeared throughout popular culture in such fields as art, photography, literary allusions, music, motion pictures, and television. Several of his homes are dedicated museums. In addition, The Mystery Writers of America presents an annual Edgar Award for distinguished work in the mystery genre.

== Early life, family and education ==
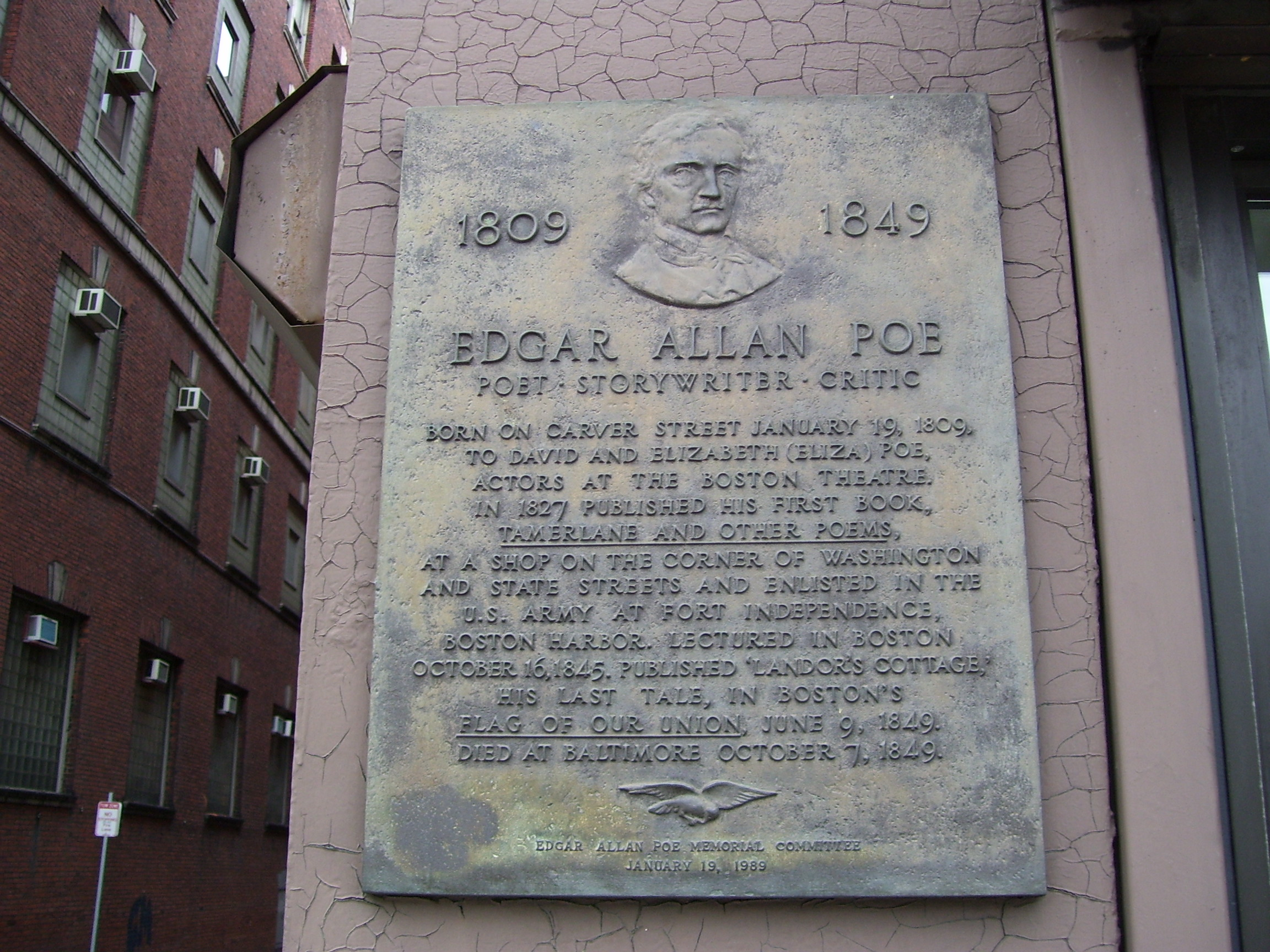
Plaque marking the approximate location of Poe's birth on Carver Street in Boston

Edgar Poe was born in Boston, Massachusetts, on January 19, 1809, the second child of American actor David Poe Jr. and English-born actress Eliza Poe. He had an elder brother, Henry, and a younger sister, Rosalie. Their grandfather, David Poe, had emigrated from County Cavan, Ireland, around 1750.

His father abandoned the family in 1810, and his mother died a year later from pulmonary tuberculosis. The nearly three-year-old Poe was then taken into the home of John Allan, a successful merchant in Richmond, Virginia, who dealt in a variety of goods, including cloth, wheat, tombstones, tobacco, and slaves. The Allans served as a foster family and gave him the name "Edgar Allan Poe", although they never formally adopted him.

The Allan family had Poe baptized into the Episcopal Church in 1812. John Allan alternately spoiled and aggressively disciplined his foster son. The family sailed to the United Kingdom in 1815. Poe attended the grammar school in Irvine, Ayrshire, Scotland (where Allan had been born), before rejoining the family in London in 1816. There he studied at a boarding school in Chelsea until summer 1817. He was subsequently entered at Reverend John Bransby's Manor House School in Stoke Newington, then a suburb 4 miles (6 km) north of London.

Poe moved with the Allans back to Richmond, Virginia, in 1820. In 1824, he served as the lieutenant of the Richmond youth honor guard as the city celebrated the visit of the Marquis de Lafayette. In March 1825, Allan's uncle and business benefactor William Galt died, who was said to be one of the wealthiest men in Richmond, leaving Allan several acres of real estate. The inheritance was estimated at $750,000 (equivalent to $21,000,000 in 2025). By summer 1825, Allan celebrated his expansive wealth by purchasing a two-story brick house called Moldavia.

Poe may have become engaged to Sarah Elmira Royster before he registered at the University of Virginia in February 1826 to study ancient and modern languages. The university was in its infancy, established on the ideals of its founder, Thomas Jefferson. It had rules against gambling, horses, guns, tobacco, and alcohol, but these rules were mostly ignored.

Jefferson enacted a system of student self-government, allowing students to choose their own studies, make their own arrangements for boarding, and report all wrongdoing to the faculty. He is known to have frequently invited students to dine with him at Monticello, although it is not known whether Poe was among these. After Jefferson died in July 1826, a fellow student later reported that Poe had been present at the funeral.

The unique system was rather chaotic, and there was a high dropout rate. During his time there, Poe lost touch with Royster and also became estranged from his foster father over gambling debts. He claimed that Allan had not given him sufficient money to register for classes, purchase texts, or procure and furnish a dormitory. Allan did send additional money and clothes, but Poe's debts increased. Poe gave up on the university after a year, but did not feel welcome to return to Richmond, especially when he learned that his sweetheart, Royster, had married another man, Alexander Shelton. Instead, he traveled to Boston in April 1827, sustaining himself with odd jobs as a clerk and newspaper contributor. Poe started using the pseudonym Henri Le Rennet during this period.

== Military career ==
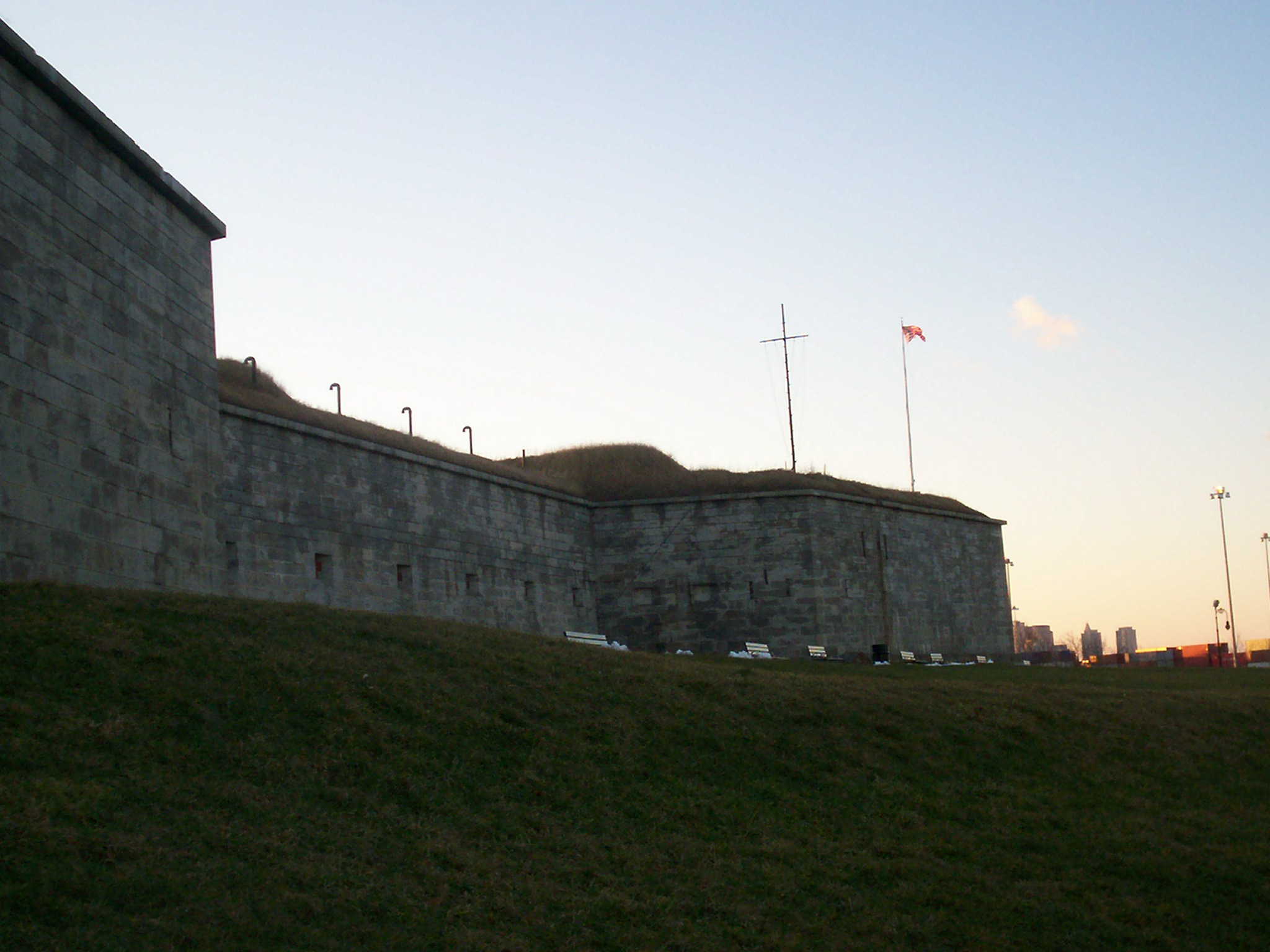
In May 1827, Poe enlisted in the U.S. Army, where he was first stationed at Fort Independence in Boston.

As Poe was unable to support himself, he decided to enlist in the United States Army as a private on May 27, 1827, using the name "Edgar A. Perry". Although he claimed that he was 22 years old, he was actually 18. He first served at Fort Independence in Boston Harbor for five dollars a month. That same year, his first book was published, a 40-page collection of poetry titled Tamerlane and Other Poems, attributed only to "A Bostonian". 50 copies were printed, and the book received virtually no attention.

Poe's 1st Regiment of Artillery was posted to Fort Moultrie in Charleston, South Carolina, before embarking on the brig Waltham on November 8, 1827. Poe was promoted to "artificer", an enlisted tradesman tasked with preparing shells for artillery. His monthly pay doubled. Poe served for two years, attaining the rank of sergeant major for artillery, the highest rank that a non-commissioned officer could achieve. He then sought to end his five-year enlistment early.

Poe revealed his real name and his actual circumstances to his commanding officer, Lieutenant Howard, who promised to allow Poe to be honorably discharged if he reconciled with Allan. Poe then wrote a letter to Allan, who was unsympathetic and spent several months ignoring Poe's pleas. Allan may not have written to Poe to inform him of his foster mother's illness. Frances Allan died on February 28, 1829. Poe visited the day after her burial. Perhaps softened by his wife's death, Allan agreed to support Poe's desire to receive an appointment to the United States Military Academy at West Point, New York.

Poe was finally discharged on April 15, 1829, after securing a replacement to finish his enlistment. Before entering West Point, he moved to Baltimore, where he stayed with his widowed aunt, Maria Clemm, her daughter Virginia Eliza Clemm (Poe's first cousin), his brother Henry, and his invalid grandmother Elizabeth Cairnes Poe. That September, Poe received "the very first words of encouragement I ever remember to have heard" in a review of his poetry by influential critic John Neal, which prompted Poe to dedicate one of the poems to Neal in his second book, Al Aaraaf, Tamerlane and Minor Poems, published in Baltimore in 1829.

Poe traveled to West Point and matriculated as a cadet on July 1, 1830. In October 1830, Allan married his second wife Louisa Patterson. This marriage, and the bitter quarrels with Poe over children born to Allan out of extramarital affairs, led to the foster father finally disowning Poe. Poe then decided to leave West Point by intentionally getting court-martialed. On February 8, 1831, he was tried for gross neglect of duty and disobedience of orders for refusing to attend formations, classes, and church. Knowing he would be found guilty, Poe pleaded not guilty to the charges in order to induce dismissal. During his time at West Point, he is known to have frequented a tavern run by Benny Havens, whom Poe allegedly referred to as "the only congenial soul in this God-forsaken place".

Poe left for New York in February 1831 and then released a third volume of poems, simply titled, Poems. The book was financed with help from his fellow cadets at West Point, some of whom donated as much as 75 cents to the cause. The total raised was approximately $170. They may have been expecting verses similar to the satirical ones Poe had written about commanding officers in the past. The book was printed by Elam Bliss of New York, labeled as "Second Edition", and included a page saying, "To the U.S. Corps of Cadets this volume is respectfully dedicated". It once again reprinted the somewhat lengthy poems, "Tamerlane", and "Al Aaraaf", while also including six previously unpublished poems, conspicuous among which are, "To Helen", and "The City in the Sea". Poe returned to Baltimore and to his aunt, brother, and cousin in March 1831. His elder brother Henry had been seriously ill for some time, in part due to complications resulting from alcoholism, and he died on August 1, 1831.

== Publishing career ==
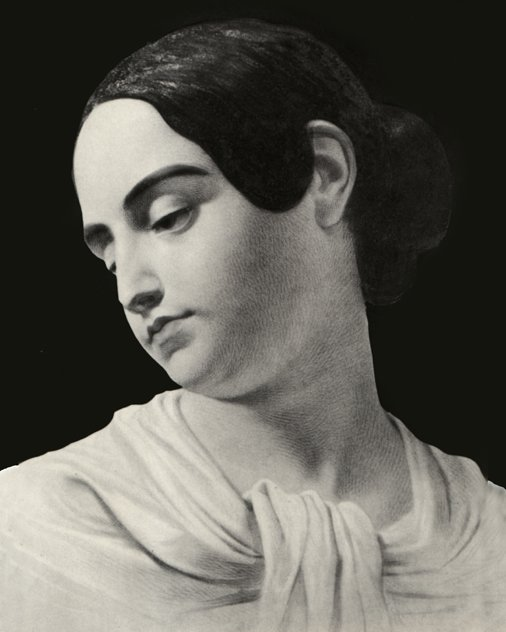
In 1835, at age 26, Poe obtained a license to marry his cousin Virginia Clemm, who was then aged 13; they were married for 11 years until her death.

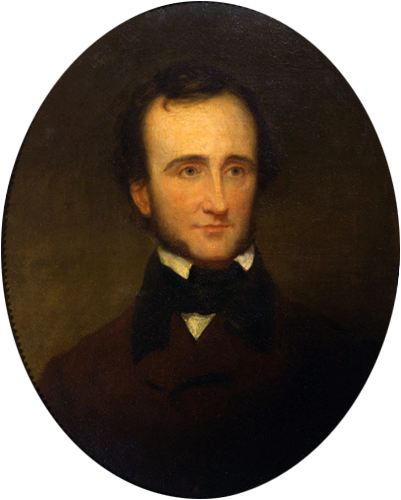
An 1845 portrait of Poe by Samuel Stillman Osgood

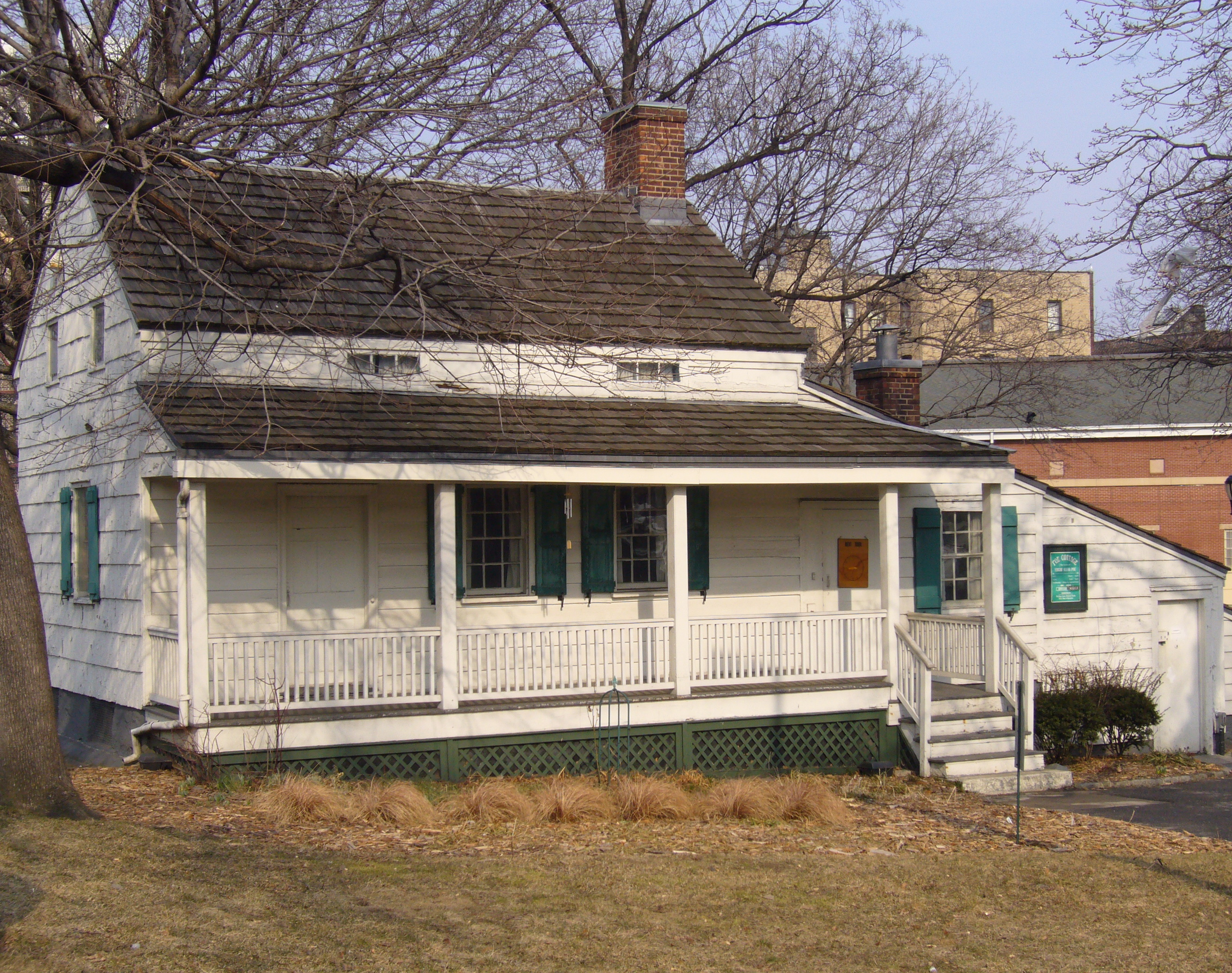
The cottage in the Fordham section of the Bronx, where Poe spent his last years

After his brother's death, Poe's earnest attempts to make a living as a writer were mostly unsuccessful. However, he eventually managed to earn a living by his pen alone, becoming one of the first American authors to do so. His efforts were initially hampered by the lack of an international copyright law. American publishers often chose to sell unauthorized copies of works by British authors rather than pay for new work written by Americans, regardless of merit. The initially anemic reception of Edgar Allan Poe's work may also have been influenced by the Panic of 1837.

There was a booming growth in American periodicals around this time, fueled in part by new technology, but many did not last beyond a few issues. Publishers often refused to pay their writers or paid them much later than they promised, and Poe repeatedly resorted to humiliating pleas for money and other assistance.

After his early attempts at poetry, Poe turned his attention to prose, perhaps based on John Neal's critiques in The Yankee magazine. He placed a few stories with a Philadelphia publication and began work on his only drama, Politian. The Baltimore Saturday Visiter awarded him a prize in October 1833 for his often overlooked short story "MS. Found in a Bottle". The tale brought him to the attention of John P. Kennedy, a Baltimorean of considerable means who helped Poe place some of his other stories and introduced him to Thomas W. White, editor of the Southern Literary Messenger in Richmond.

In 1835, Poe became assistant editor of the Southern Literary Messenger, but White discharged him within a few weeks, allegedly for being drunk on the job. Poe then returned to Baltimore, where he obtained a license to marry his cousin Virginia on September 22, 1835, though it is unknown if they were actually married at that time. He was 26 and she was 13.

Poe was reinstated by White after promising to improve his behavior, and he returned to Richmond with Virginia and her mother. He remained at the Messenger until January 1837. During this period, Poe claimed that its circulation increased from 700 to 3,500. He published several poems, and many book reviews, critiques, essays, and articles, as well as a few stories in the paper. On May 16, 1836, he and Virginia were officially married at a Presbyterian wedding ceremony performed by Amasa Converse at their Richmond boarding house, with a witness falsely attesting Clemm's age as 21.

=== Philadelphia ===
In 1838, Poe relocated to Philadelphia, where he lived at five different residences between 1838 and 1844, one of which at 532 N. 7th Street has been preserved as a National Historic Landmark.

That same year, Poe's only novel, The Narrative of Arthur Gordon Pym of Nantucket was published and widely reviewed. In the summer of 1839, he became assistant editor of Burton's Gentleman's Magazine. He published numerous articles, stories, and reviews, enhancing the reputation he had established at the Messenger as one of America's foremost literary critics. Also in 1839, the collection Tales of the Grotesque and Arabesque was published in two volumes, though Poe received little remuneration from it and the volumes received generally mixed reviews.

In June 1840, Poe published a prospectus announcing his intentions to start his own journal called The Stylus, although he originally intended to call it The Penn, since it would have been based in Philadelphia. He bought advertising space for the prospectus in the June 6, 1840, issue of Philadelphia's Saturday Evening Post: "Prospectus of the Penn Magazine, a Monthly Literary journal to be edited and published in the city of Philadelphia by Edgar A. Poe." However, Poe died before the journal could be produced.

Poe left Burton's after a year and found a position as writer and co-editor at Graham's Magazine, which was a successful monthly publication. In the last number of Graham's for 1841, Poe was among the co-signatories to an editorial note of celebration concerning the tremendous success the magazine had achieved in the past year: "Perhaps the editors of no magazine, either in America or in Europe, ever sat down, at the close of a year, to contemplate the progress of their work with more satisfaction than we do now. Our success has been unexampled, almost incredible. We may assert without fear of contradiction that no periodical ever witnessed the same increase during so short a period."

Around this time, Poe attempted to secure a position in the administration of John Tyler, claiming that he was a member of the Whig Party. He hoped to be appointed to the United States Custom House in Philadelphia with help from President Tyler's son Robert, an acquaintance of Poe's friend Frederick Thomas. However, Poe failed to appear for a meeting with Thomas to discuss the appointment in mid-September 1842, claiming to have been sick, though Thomas believed that he had been drunk. Poe was promised an appointment, but all positions were eventually filled by others.

One evening in January 1842, Virginia showed the first signs of consumption, or tuberculosis, while singing and playing the piano, which Poe described as the breaking of a blood vessel in her throat. She only partially recovered, and Poe is alleged to have begun to drink heavily due to the stress he suffered as a result of her illness.

He then left Graham's and attempted to find a new position, angling for a government post. He finally decided to return to New York where he worked briefly at the Evening Mirror before becoming editor of the Broadway Journal, and later its owner. There Poe alienated himself from other writers by, among other things, publicly accusing Henry Wadsworth Longfellow of plagiarism, though Longfellow never responded. On January 29, 1845, Poe's poem, "The Raven", appeared in the Evening Mirror and quickly became a popular sensation. It made Poe a household name almost instantly, though at the time, he was paid only $9 (equivalent to $311 in 2025) for its publication. It was concurrently published in The American Review: A Whig Journal under the pseudonym "Quarles".

=== The Bronx ===
The Broadway Journal failed in 1846, and Poe moved to a cottage in Fordham, New York, in the Bronx. That home, now known as the Edgar Allan Poe Cottage, was relocated in later years to a park near the southeast corner of the Grand Concourse and Kingsbridge Road. Nearby, Poe befriended the Jesuits at St. John's College, now Fordham University. Virginia died at the cottage on January 30, 1847. Biographers and critics often suggest that Poe's frequent theme of the "death of a beautiful woman" stems from the repeated loss of women throughout his life, including his wife.

Poe was increasingly unstable after his wife's death. He attempted to court the poet Sarah Helen Whitman, who lived in Providence, Rhode Island. Their engagement failed, purportedly because of Poe's drinking and erratic behavior. There is also strong evidence that Whitman's mother intervened and derailed the relationship. Poe then returned to Richmond and resumed a relationship with his childhood sweetheart, Sarah Elmira Royster.

== Death ==
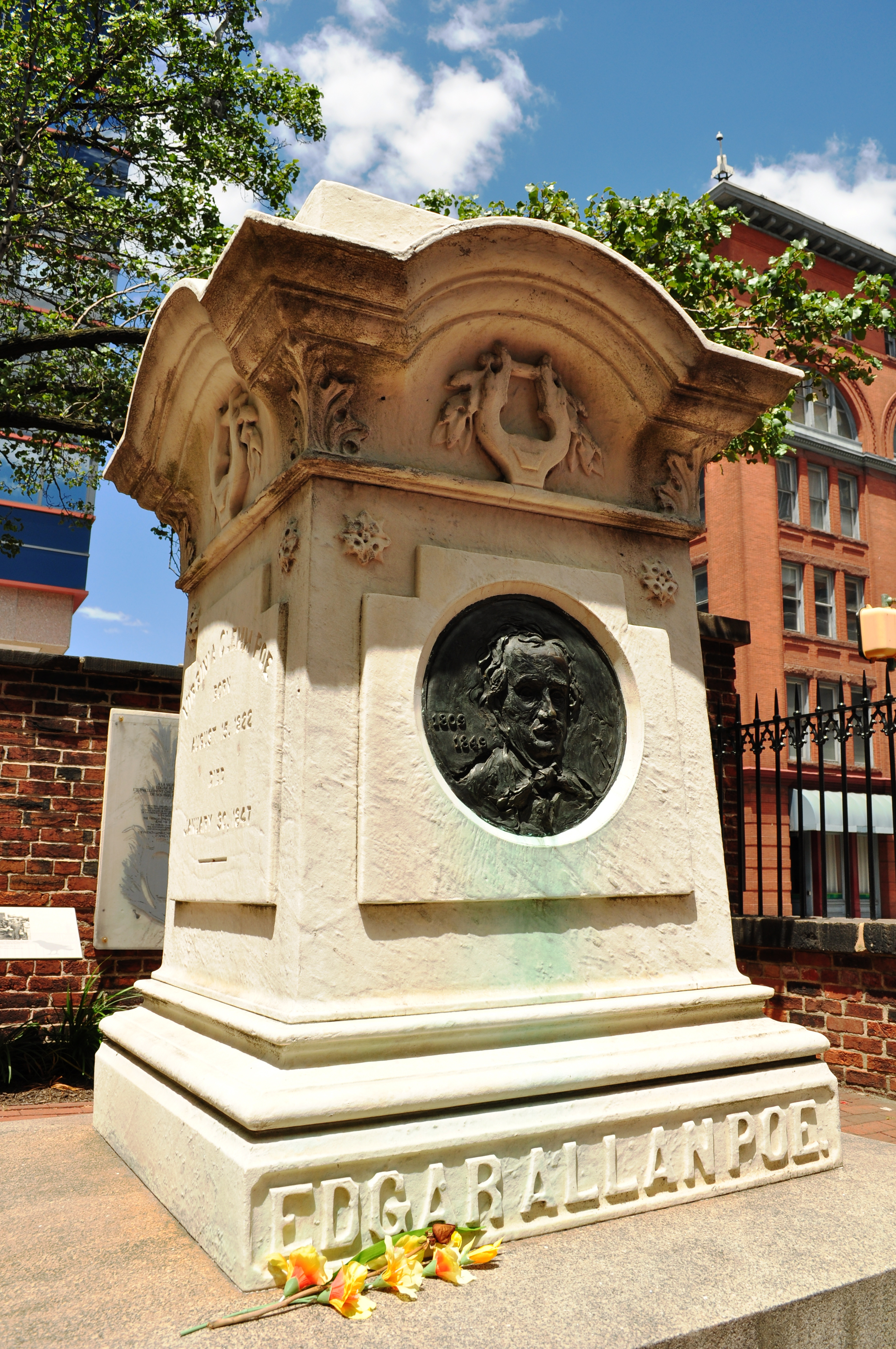
Poe is interred at Westminster Hall in Baltimore, Maryland (Lat: 39.29027; Long: −76.62333); the circumstances and cause of his death remain uncertain.

On October 3, 1849, Poe was found semiconscious in Baltimore, "in great distress, and... in need of immediate assistance", according to Joseph W. Walker, who found him. He was taken to Washington Medical College, where he died on Sunday, October 7, 1849, at 5:00 in the morning.

Poe was not coherent long enough to explain how he came to be in his dire condition and why he was wearing clothes that were not his own. He is said to have repeatedly called out the name "Reynolds" on the night before his death, though it is unclear to whom he was referring. His attending physician said that Poe's final words were, "Lord help my poor soul". All of the relevant medical records have been lost, including Poe's death certificate.

Newspapers at the time reported Poe's death as "congestion of the brain" or "cerebral inflammation", common euphemisms for death from disreputable causes such as alcoholism. The actual cause of death remains a mystery.

Speculation has included delirium tremens, heart disease, epilepsy, syphilis, meningeal inflammation, carbon monoxide poisoning, and rabies. One theory dating from 1872 suggests that Poe's death resulted from cooping, a form of electoral fraud, in which citizens were forced to vote for a particular candidate, sometimes leading to violence and even murder.

=== Griswold's memoir ===
Immediately after Poe's death, his literary rival Rufus Wilmot Griswold, wrote a slanted, high-profile obituary under a pseudonym, filled with falsehoods that cast Poe as a lunatic, and which described him as a person who "walked the streets, in madness or melancholy, with lips moving in indistinct curses, or with eyes upturned in passionate prayers, (never for himself, for he felt, or professed to feel, that he was already damned)".

The long obituary appeared in the New York Tribune, signed, "Ludwig" on the day Poe was buried in Baltimore. It was further published throughout the country. The obituary began, "Edgar Allan Poe is dead. He died in Baltimore the day before yesterday. This announcement will startle many, but few will be grieved by it." "Ludwig" was soon identified as Griswold, an editor, critic, and anthologist who had held a grudge against Poe since 1842. Griswold somehow became Poe's literary executor and attempted to destroy his enemy's reputation after his death.

Griswold wrote a biographical article of Poe called "Memoir of the Author", which he included in an 1850 volume of the collected works. There he depicted Poe as a depraved, drunken, drug-addled madman, including some of Poe's "letters" as evidence. Many of his claims were either outright lies or obvious distortions; for example, there is little to no evidence that Edgar Allan Poe was a drug addict. Griswold's book was denounced by those who knew Poe well, including John Neal, who published an article defending Poe and attacking Griswold as a "Rhadamanthus, who is not to be bilked of his fee, a thimble-full of newspaper notoriety". Griswold's book nevertheless became a popularly accepted biographical source. This was in part because it was the only full biography available and was widely reprinted, and in part because readers thrilled at the thought of reading works by an "evil" man. Letters that Griswold presented as proof were later revealed as forgeries.

== Literary style and themes ==
=== Genres ===
Poe's best-known fiction works have been labeled as Gothic horror, and adhere to that genre's general propensity to appeal to the public's taste for the terrifying or psychologically intimidating. His most recurrent themes seem to deal with death. The physical signs indicating death, the nature of decomposition, the popular concerns of Poe's day about premature burial, the reanimation of the dead, are all at length explored in his more notable works. Many of his writings are generally considered to be part of the dark romanticism genre, which is said to be a literary reaction to transcendentalism, which Poe strongly criticized. He referred to followers of the transcendental movement, including Emerson, as "Frog-Pondians", after the pond on Boston Common, and ridiculed their writings as "metaphor—run mad," lapsing into "obscurity for obscurity's sake" or "mysticism for mysticism's sake". However, Poe once wrote in a letter to Thomas Holley Chivers that he did not dislike transcendentalists, "only the pretenders and sophists among them".

Beyond the horror stories he is most famous for, Poe also wrote a number of satires, humor tales, and hoaxes. He was a master of sarcasm. For comic effect, he often used irony and ludicrous extravagance in a deliberate attempt to liberate the reader from cultural and literary conformity. "Metzengerstein" is the first story that Poe is known to have published, and his first foray into horror, but it was originally intended as a burlesque satirizing the popular genres of Poe's time. Poe was also one of the forerunners of American science fiction, responding in his voluminous writing to such emerging literary trends as the explorations into the possibilities of hot air balloons as featured in such works as, "The Balloon-Hoax".

Much of Poe's work coincided with themes that readers of his day found appealing, though he often professed to abhor the tastes of the majority of the people who read for pleasure in his time. In his critical works, Poe investigated and wrote about many of the pseudosciences that were then popular with the majority of his fellow Americans. They included, but were not limited to, the fields of astrology, cosmology, phrenology, and physiognomy.

=== Literary theory ===
Poe's writings often reflect the literary theories he introduced in his prolific critical works and expounded on in such essays as, "The Poetic Principle". He disliked didacticism and imitation masquerading as influence, believing originality to be the highest mark of genius. In Poe's conception of the artist's life, the attainment of the concretization of beauty should be the ultimate goal. That which is unique is alone of value. Works with obvious meanings, he wrote, cease to be art. He believed that any work worthy of being praised should have as its focus a single specific effect. That which does not tend towards the effect is extraneous. In his view, every serious writer must carefully calculate each sentiment and idea in their work to ensure that it strengthens the theme of the piece.

Poe describes the method he employed while composing his most famous poem, "The Raven", in an essay entitled "The Philosophy of Composition". However, many of Poe's critics have questioned whether the method enunciated in the essay was formulated before the poem was written, or afterward, or, as T. S. Eliot is quoted as saying, "It is difficult for us to read that essay without reflecting that if Poe plotted out his poem with such calculation, he might have taken a little more pains over it: the result hardly does credit to the method." Biographer Joseph Wood Krutch described the essay as "a rather highly ingenious exercise in the art of rationalization".

== Legacy ==
=== Influence ===
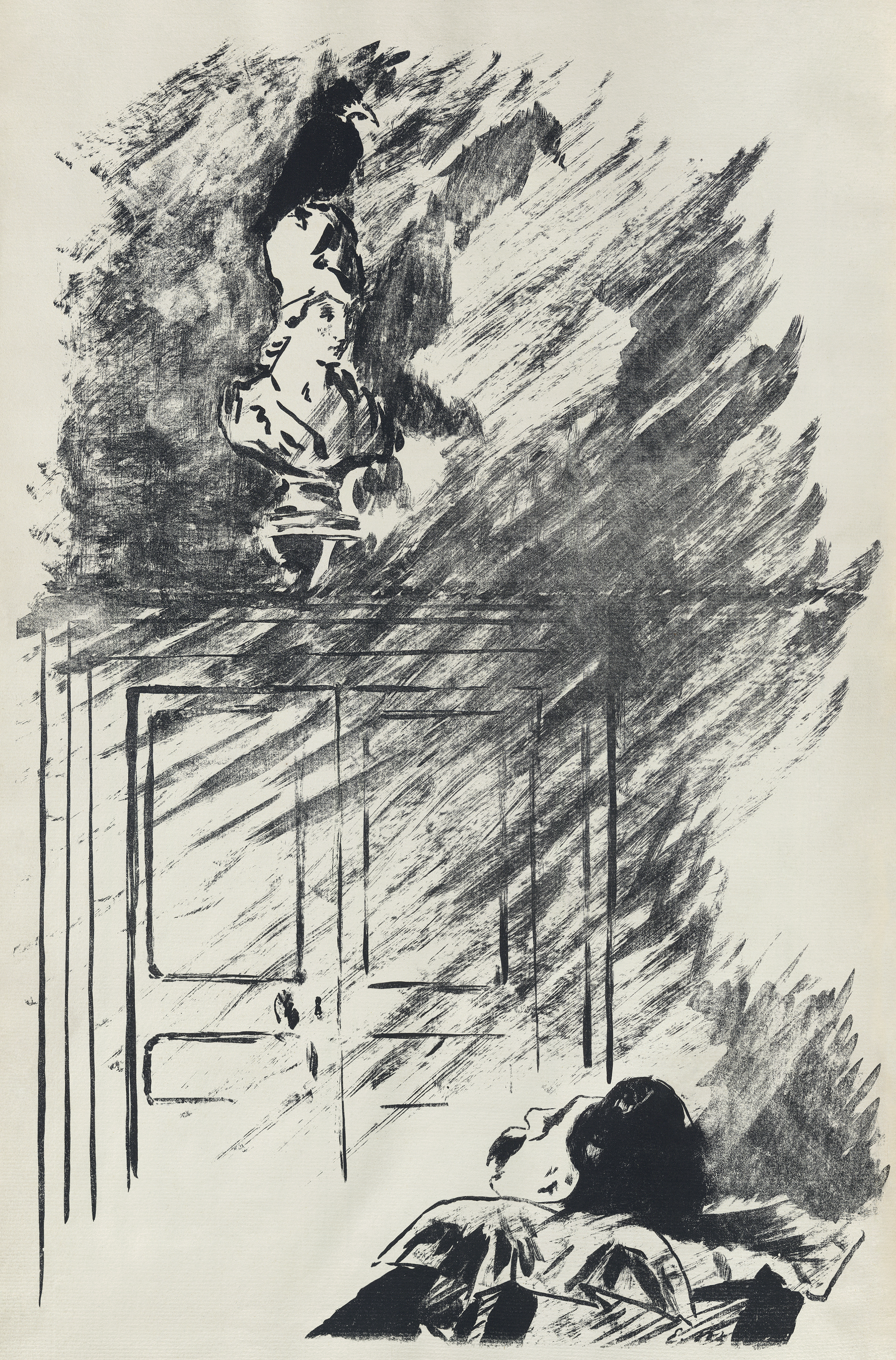
An 1875 illustration of Poe by French impressionist Édouard Manet for the Stéphane Mallarmé translation of "The Raven"

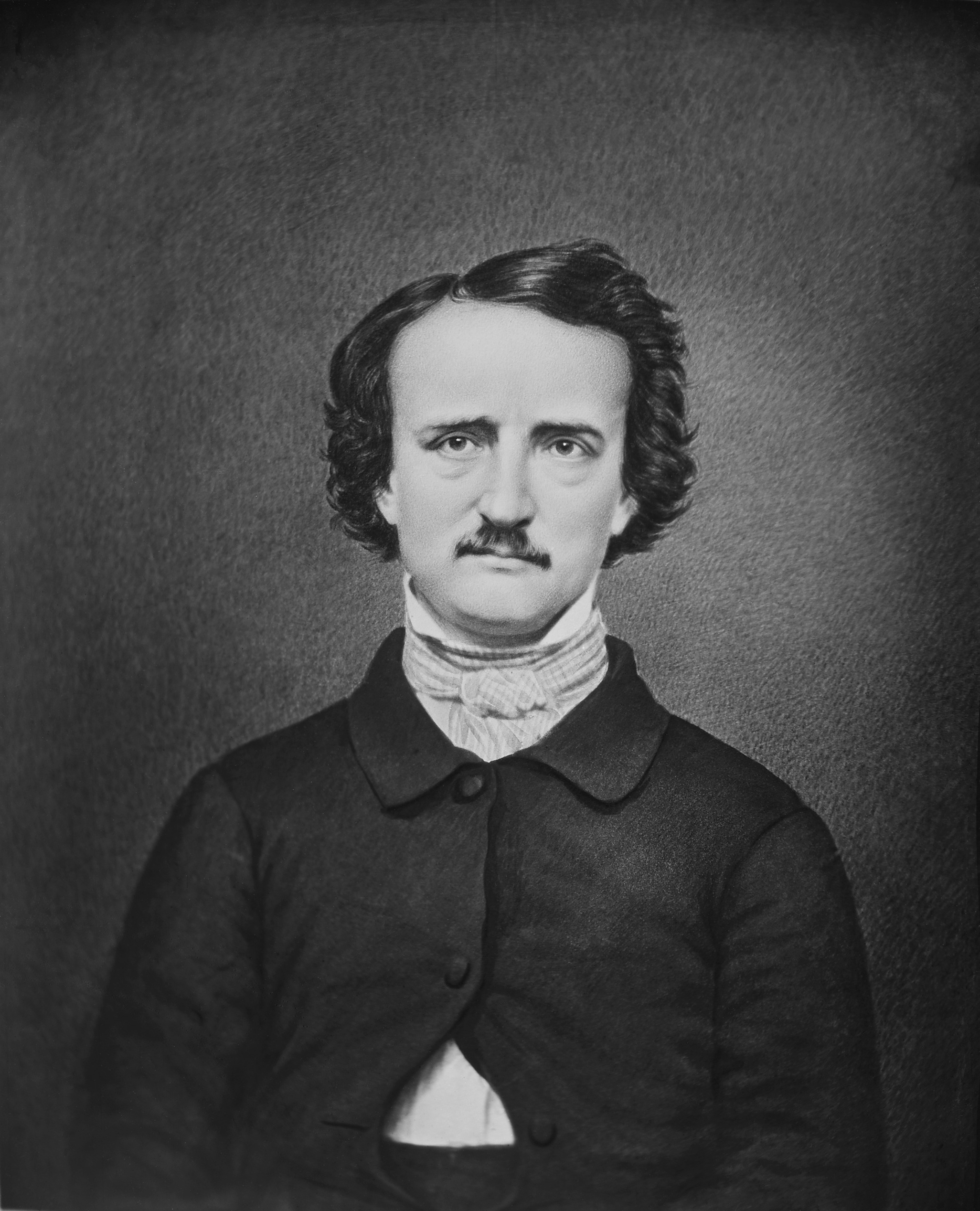
Poe depicted in a modern retouched version of a daguerreotype

During his lifetime, Poe was mostly recognized as a literary critic. The vast majority of Edgar Allan Poe's writings are nonfictional. Contemporary critic James Russell Lowell called him, "the most discriminating, philosophical, and fearless critic upon imaginative works who has written in America," suggesting—rhetorically—that he occasionally used prussic acid instead of ink. Poe's often caustic reviews earned him the reputation of being a "tomahawk man". One target of Poe's criticism was Boston's acclaimed poet Henry Wadsworth Longfellow, who was defended by his friends, literary and otherwise, in what was later called, "The Longfellow War". Poe accused Longfellow of "the heresy of the didactic", writing poetry that was preachy, derivative, and thematically plagiarized. Poe correctly predicted that Longfellow's reputation and style of poetry would decline, concluding, "We grant him high qualities, but deny him the Future".

Poe became known as the creator of a type of fiction that was difficult to categorize and nearly impossible to imitate. He was one of the first American authors of the 19th century to become more popular in Europe than in the United States. Poe was particularly esteemed in France, in part due to early translations of his work by Charles Baudelaire. Baudelaire's translations became definitive renditions of Poe's work in Continental Europe.

Poe's early mystery tales featuring the detective, C. Auguste Dupin, though not numerous, laid the groundwork for similar characters that would eventually become famous throughout the world. Sir Arthur Conan Doyle said, "Each [of Poe's detective stories] is a root from which a whole literature has developed.... Where was the detective story until Poe breathed the breath of life into it?" The Mystery Writers of America have named their awards for excellence in the mystery genre "The Edgars". Poe's work also influenced writings that would eventually come to be called "science fiction", notably the works of Jules Verne, who wrote a sequel to Poe's novel The Narrative of Arthur Gordon Pym of Nantucket called An Antarctic Mystery, also known as The Sphinx of the Ice Fields. And as the author H. G. Wells noted, "Pym tells what a very intelligent mind could imagine about the south polar region a century ago". In 2013, The Guardian cited Pym as one of the greatest novels ever written in the English language, and noted its influence on later authors such as Doyle, Henry James, B. Traven, and David Morrell.

Horror author and historian H. P. Lovecraft was heavily influenced by Poe's horror tales, dedicating an entire section of his long essay, "Supernatural Horror in Literature", to his influence on the genre. In his letters, Lovecraft described Poe as his "God of Fiction". Lovecraft's earliest stories are clearly influenced by Poe. At the Mountains of Madness directly quotes him. Lovecraft made extensive use of Poe's concept of the "unity of effect" in his fiction. Alfred Hitchcock once said, "It's because I liked Edgar Allan Poe's stories so much that I began to make suspense films". Many references to Poe's works are present in Vladimir Nabokov's novels. The Japanese author Tarō Hirai derived his pen name, Edogawa Ranpo, from an altered phonetic rendering of Poe's name.

Poe's works have spawned many imitators. In 1863, a medium named Lizzie Doten published Poems of the Inner Life, which compiled several poems she claimed were written by the channeled spirits of dead authors. She claimed six were by Poe, though Poe scholar Christopher P. Semtner dismisses them as "merely pastiches".

Poe has also received criticism. This is partly because of the negative perception of his personal character and its influence upon his reputation. William Butler Yeats was occasionally critical of Poe and once called him "vulgar". Transcendentalist Ralph Waldo Emerson reacted to "The Raven" by saying, "I see nothing in it", and derisively referred to Poe as "the jingle man". Aldous Huxley wrote that Poe's writing "falls into vulgarity" by being "too poetical"—the equivalent of wearing a diamond ring on every finger.

It is believed that only twelve copies have survived of Poe's first book Tamerlane and Other Poems. In December 2009, one copy sold at Christie's auctioneers in New York City for $662,500, a record price paid for a work of American literature.

=== Physics and cosmology ===
Eureka: A Prose Poem, an essay written in 1848, included a cosmological theory that presaged the Big Bang theory by 80 years, as well as the first plausible solution to Olbers' paradox. Poe eschewed the scientific method in Eureka and instead wrote from pure intuition. For this reason, he considered it a work of art, not science, but insisted that it was still true and considered it to be his career masterpiece. Even so, Eureka is full of scientific errors. In particular, Poe's suggestions ignored Newtonian principles regarding the density and rotation of planets.

=== Cryptography ===
Poe had a keen interest in cryptography. He had placed a notice of his abilities in the Philadelphia paper Alexander's Weekly (Express) Messenger, inviting submissions of ciphers which he proceeded to solve. In July 1841, Poe had published an essay called "A Few Words on Secret Writing" in Graham's Magazine. Capitalizing on public interest in the topic, he wrote "The Gold-Bug" incorporating ciphers as an essential part of the story. Poe's success with cryptography relied not so much on his deep knowledge of that field (his method was limited to the simple substitution cryptogram) as on his knowledge of the magazine and newspaper culture. His keen analytical abilities, which were so evident in his detective stories, allowed him to see that the general public was largely ignorant of the methods by which a simple substitution cryptogram can be solved, and he used this to his advantage. The sensation that Poe created with his cryptography stunts played a major role in popularizing cryptograms in newspapers and magazines.

Two ciphers he published in 1841 under the name "W. B. Tyler" were not solved until 1992 and 2000 respectively. One was a quote from Joseph Addison's play Cato; the other is probably based on a poem by Hester Thrale.

Poe had an influence on cryptography beyond increasing public interest during his lifetime. William Friedman, America's foremost cryptologist, was heavily influenced by Poe. Friedman's initial interest in cryptography came from reading "The Gold-Bug" as a child, an interest that he later put to use in deciphering Japan's PURPLE code during World War II.

=== Political stances ===
Poe was a news writer for a variety of presses including Southern Literary Messenger, Burton's Gentleman's Magazine, Graham's Magazine, and the Broadway Journal. In his news writing, Poe was critical of the American political system and was consequently labeled anti-American and "bitterly hostile." He often called the government a mobocracy. In the Southern Literary Messenger, he critiqued lynching by calling its proponents "A trained band of villains" and "unlawful and abandoned wretches".

In Graham's Magazine in 1846, he proposed separating the Appalachian South from the United States and naming it the "United States of Alleghania".

== Commemorations and namesake ==
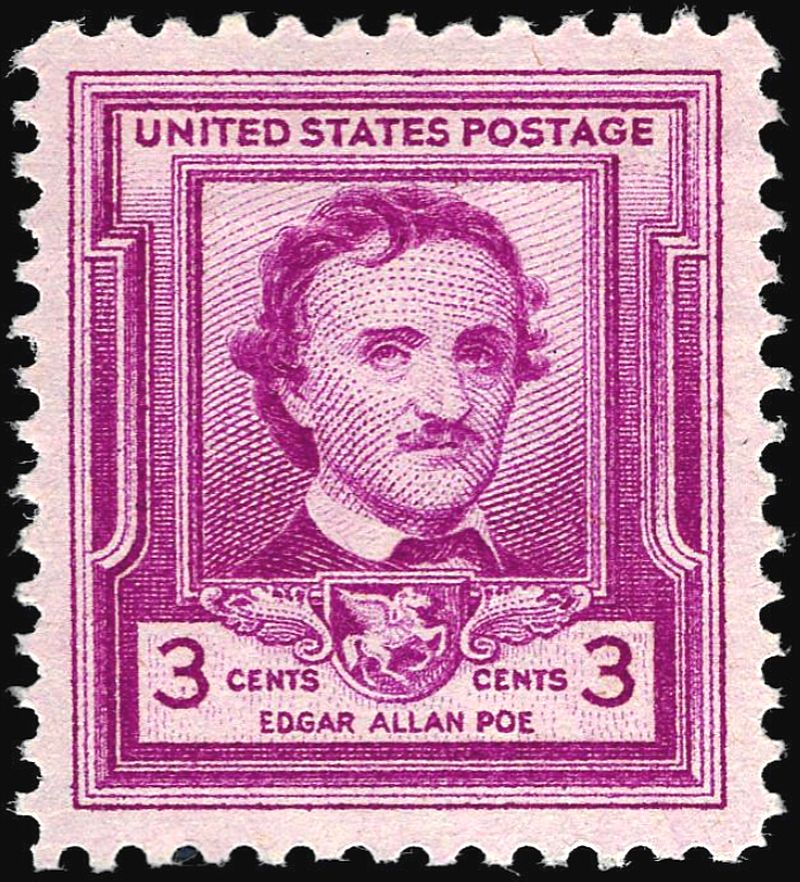
On October 7, 1949, the U.S. Post Office issued a commemorative stamp honoring Edgar Allan Poe on the 100th anniversary of his death.

=== Character ===
The historical Edgar Allan Poe has appeared as a fictionalized character, often in order to represent the "mad genius" or "tormented artist" and in order to exploit his personal struggles. Many such depictions also blend in with characters from his stories, suggesting that Poe and his characters share identities. Often, fictional depictions of Poe use his mystery-solving skills in such novels as The Poe Shadow by Matthew Pearl.

=== Preserved homes, landmarks, and museums ===
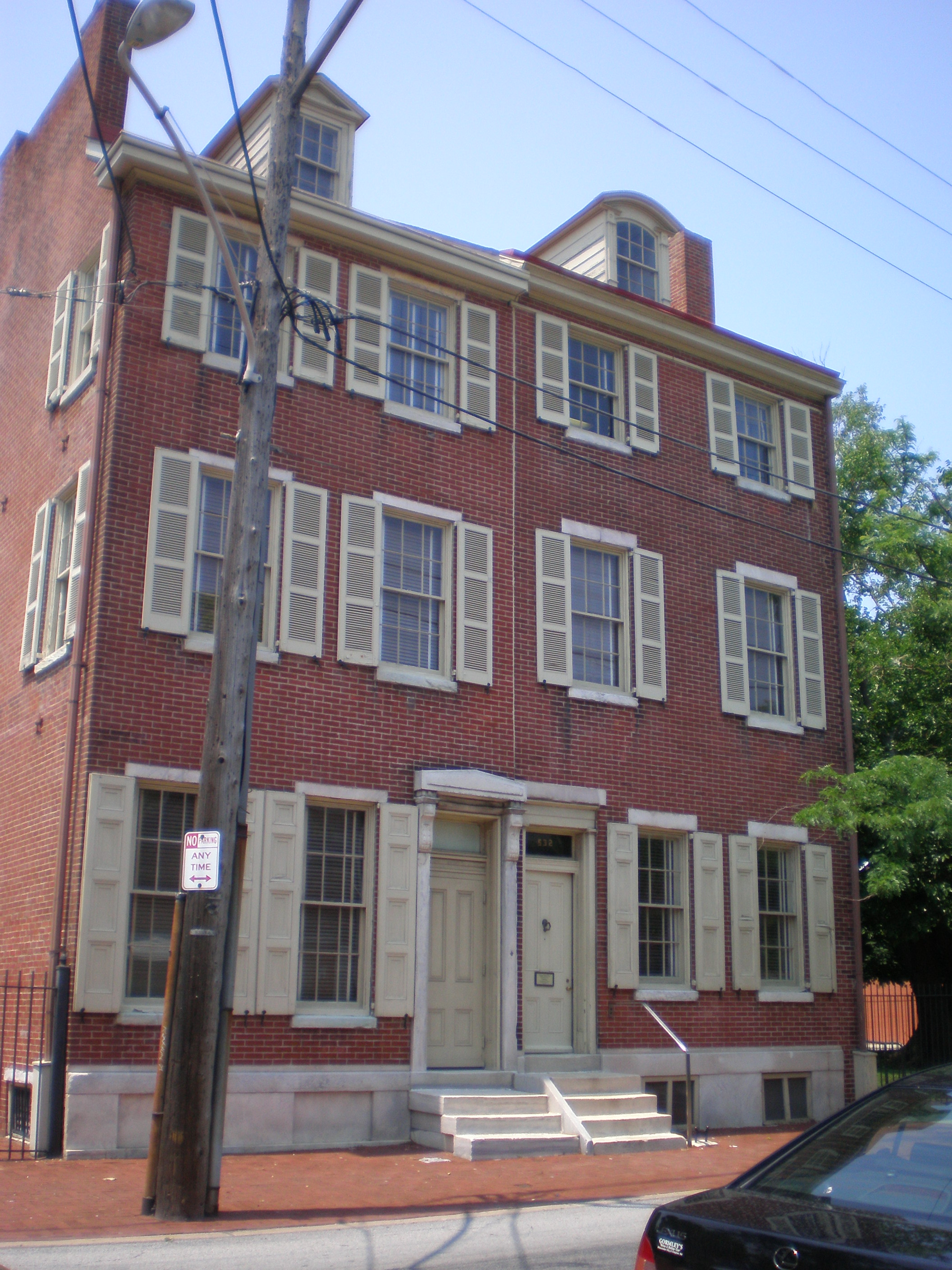
The Edgar Allan Poe National Historic Site in Philadelphia, one of several preserved former residences of Poe

No childhood home of Poe is still standing, including the Allan family's Moldavia estate. The oldest standing home in Richmond, the Old Stone House, is in use as the Edgar Allan Poe Museum, though Poe never lived there. The collection includes many items that Poe used during his time with the Allan family, and also features several rare first printings of Poe works. 13 West Range is the dorm room that Poe is believed to have used while studying at the University of Virginia in 1826; it is preserved and available for visits. Its upkeep is overseen by a group of students and staff known as the Raven Society.

The earliest surviving home in which Poe lived is at 203 North Amity St. in Baltimore, which is preserved as the Edgar Allan Poe House and Museum. Poe is believed to have lived in the home at the age of 23 when he first lived with Maria Clemm and Virginia and possibly his grandmother and possibly his brother William Henry Leonard Poe.

Between 1834 and 1844, Poe lived in at least four different Philadelphia residences, including the Indian Queen Hotel at 15 S. 4th Street, at a residence at 16th and Locust Streets, at 2502 Fairmount Street, and then in the Spring Garden section of the city at 532 N. 7th Street, a residence that has been preserved by the National Park Service as the Edgar Allan Poe National Historic Site. Poe's final home in Bronx, New York City, is preserved as the Edgar Allan Poe Cottage.

In Boston, a commemorative plaque on Boylston Street is several blocks away from the actual location of Poe's birth. The house which was his birthplace at 62 Carver Street no longer exists; also, the street has since been renamed "Charles Street South". A "square" at the intersection of Broadway, Fayette, and Carver Streets had once been named in his honor, but it disappeared when the streets were rearranged. In 2009, the intersection of Charles and Boylston streets (two blocks north of his birthplace) was designated "Edgar Allan Poe Square".

In March 2014, fundraising was completed for construction of a permanent memorial sculpture, known as Poe Returning to Boston, at this location. The winning design by Stefanie Rocknak depicts a life-sized Poe striding against the wind, accompanied by a flying raven; his suitcase lid has fallen open, leaving a "paper trail" of literary works embedded in the sidewalk behind him. The public unveiling on October 5, 2014, was attended by former U.S. poet laureate Robert Pinsky.

Other Poe landmarks include a building on the Upper West Side, where Poe temporarily lived when he first moved to New York City. A plaque suggests that Poe wrote "The Raven" here. On Sullivan's Island in Charleston County, South Carolina, the setting of Poe's tale "The Gold-Bug" and where Poe served in the Army in 1827 at Fort Moultrie, there is a restaurant called Poe's Tavern. In the Fells Point section of Baltimore, a bar still stands where legend says that Poe was last seen drinking before his death. Known as "The Horse You Came in On", local lore insists that a ghost whom they call "Edgar" haunts the rooms above.

=== Poe Toaster ===
Between 1949 and 2009, a bottle of cognac and three roses were left at Poe's original grave marker every January 19 by an unknown visitor affectionately referred to as the "Poe Toaster". Sam Porpora was a historian at the Westminster Church in Baltimore, where Poe is buried; he claimed on August 15, 2007, that he had started the tradition in 1949. Porpora said that the tradition began in order to raise money and enhance the profile of the church. His story has not been confirmed, and some details which he gave to the press are factually inaccurate. The Poe Toaster's last appearance was on January 19, 2009, the day of Poe's bicentennial.

== List of selected works ==
Short stories

- "Berenice"
- "The Black Cat"
- "The Cask of Amontillado"
- "A Descent into the Maelström"
- "The Facts in the Case of M. Valdemar"
- "The Fall of the House of Usher"
- "The Gold-Bug"
- "Hop-Frog"
- "The Imp of the Perverse"
- "Ligeia"
- "The Masque of the Red Death"
- "Morella"
- "The Murders in the Rue Morgue"
- "Never Bet the Devil Your Head"
- "The Oval Portrait"
- "The Pit and the Pendulum"
- "The Premature Burial"
- "The Purloined Letter"
- "The System of Doctor Tarr and Professor Fether"
- "The Tell-Tale Heart"
- "Loss of Breath"
- "William Wilson"

Poetry

- "Al Aaraaf"
- "Annabel Lee"
- "The Bells"
- "The City in the Sea"
- "The Conqueror Worm"
- "A Dream Within a Dream"
- "Eldorado"
- "Eulalie"
- "The Haunted Palace"
- "To Helen"
- "Lenore"
- "Tamerlane"
- "The Raven"
- "Ulalume"

Other works

- Politian (1835) – Poe's only play
- The Narrative of Arthur Gordon Pym of Nantucket (1838) – Poe's only complete novel
- The Journal of Julius Rodman (1840) – Poe's second, unfinished novel
- "The Balloon-Hoax" (1844) – A journalistic hoax printed as a true story
- "The Philosophy of Composition" (1846) – Essay
- Eureka: A Prose Poem (1848) – Essay
- "The Poetic Principle" (1848) – Essay
- "The Light-House" (1849) – Poe's last, incomplete work

== See also ==
- Edgar Allan Poe and music
- Poe – Crater on Mercury
- USS E.A. Poe

== Sources ==
- Allen, Hervey (1927). "Introduction". The Works of Edgar Allan Poe. New York: P.F. Collier & Son. OCLC 1050810755.
- "Man Reveals Legend of Mystery Visitor to Edgar Allan Poe's Grave". Fox News. Associated Press. August 15, 2007. Archived from the original on December 22, 2007.
- Benton, Richard P. (1987). "Poe's Literary Labors and Rewards". In Fisher, Benjamin Franklin IV (ed.). Myths and Reality: The Mysterious Mr. Poe. Baltimore: The Edgar Allan Poe Society. pp. 1–25. ISBN 978-0-9616449-1-8. Archived from the original on September 17, 2025.
- Bramsback, Birgit (1970). "The Final Illness and Death of Edgar Allan Poe: An Attempt at Reassessment". Studia Neophilologica. XLII: 40. doi:10.1080/00393277008587456.
- BronxHistoricalSociety.org (2007). "Edgar Allan Poe Cottage". Archived from the original on October 11, 2007.
- Burns, Niccole (November 15, 2006). "Poe wrote most important works in Philadelphia". School of Communication – University of Miami. Archived from the original on December 15, 2007.
- Cappi, Alberto (1994). "Edgar Allan Poe's Physical Cosmology". Quarterly Journal of the Royal Astronomical Society. 35: 177–192. Bibcode:1994QJRAS..35..177C.
- Canada, Mark, ed. (1997). "Edgar Allan Poe Chronology". Canada's America. Archived from the original on May 18, 2007.
- Cornelius, Kay (2002). "Biography of Edgar Allan Poe". In Harold Bloom (ed.). Bloom's BioCritiques: Edgar Allan Poe. Philadelphia, PA: Chelsea House Publishers. ISBN 978-0-7910-6173-2.
- Edgar Allan Poe Society (2007). "The Baltimore Poe House and Museum". eapoe.org. Archived from the original on May 6, 2022.
- Fisher, Benjamin Franklin IV (1993). "Poe's 'Metzengerstein': Not a Hoax (1971)". On Poe: The Best from American Literature. Durham, NC: Duke University Press. pp. 142–149. ISBN 978-0-8223-1311-3.
- Frank, Frederick S.; Magistrale, Anthony (1997). The Poe Encyclopedia. Westport, CT: Greenwood Press. ISBN 978-0-313-27768-9.
- Friedman, William F. (1993). "Edgar Allan Poe, Cryptographer (1936)". On Poe: The Best from American Literature. Durham, NC: Duke University Press. pp. 40–54. ISBN 978-0-8223-1311-3.
- Gargano, James W. (1967). "The Question of Poe's Narrators". In Regan, Robert (ed.). Poe: A Collection of Critical Essays. Englewood Cliffs, NJ: Prentice-Hall. p. 165. ISBN 978-0-13-684963-6.
- Glenn, Joshua (April 9, 2007). "The house of Poe – mystery solved!". The Boston Globe. Archived from the original on October 8, 2013.
- Grayson, Eric (2005). "Weird Science, Weirder Unity: Phrenology and Physiognomy in Edgar Allan Poe". Mode 1: 56–77. Archived from the original on November 3, 2013.
- Hall, Wiley (August 15, 2007). "Poe Fan Takes Credit for Grave Legend". USA Today. Associated Press.
- Harner, Gary Wayne (1990). "Edgar Allan Poe in France: Baudelaire's Labor of Love". In Fisher, Benjamin Franklin IV (ed.). Poe and His Times: The Artist and His Milieu. Baltimore: The Edgar Allan Poe Society. ISBN 978-0-9616449-2-5.
- Harrison, Edward (1987). Darkness at Night: A Riddle of the Universe. Cambridge, Massachusetts: Harvard University Press. ISBN 978-0-674-19270-6.
- Hayes, Kevin J. (2002). The Cambridge Companion to Edgar Allan Poe. Cambridge: Cambridge University Press. ISBN 978-0-521-79326-1.
- Hecker, William J. (2005), Private Perry and Mister Poe: The West Point Poems, Baton Rouge, LA: Louisiana State University Press, ISBN 978-0-8071-3054-4
- Hoffman, Daniel (1998) [1972]. Poe Poe Poe Poe Poe Poe Poe. Baton Rouge: Louisiana State University Press. ISBN 978-0-8071-2321-8.
- Hungerford, Edward (1930). "Poe and Phrenology". American Literature. 1 (3): 209–231. doi:10.2307/2920231. JSTOR 2920231.
- Huxley, Aldous (1967). "Vulgarity in Literature". In Regan, Robert (ed.). Poe: A Collection of Critical Essays. Englewood Cliffs, NJ: Prentice-Hall. p. 32. ISBN 978-0-13-684963-6.
- Jamneck, Lynne (August 2012). "Tekeli-li! Disturbing Language in Edgar Allan Poe and H. P. Lovecraft". Lovecraft Annual (6): 126–151. ISSN 1935-6102. JSTOR 26868454.
- Jannaccone, Pasquale (translated by Peter Mitilineos) (1974). "The Aesthetics of Edgar Poe". Poe Studies. 7 (1): 1–13. doi:10.1111/j.1754-6095.1974.tb00224.x.
- Joshi, S.T. (2013). "Lovecraft's 'Dunsanian Studies'". In Joshi, S.T. (ed.). Critical Essays on Lord Dunsany. Scarecrow Press. pp. 241–264. ISBN 978-0-8108-9235-4. OCLC 1026953908.
- Joshi, S.T. (1996). H. P. Lovecraft: A Life (First ed.). West Warwick, Rhode Island: Necronomicon Press. ISBN 0-940884-89-5. OCLC 34906142.
- Joshi, S.T. (2017). "Foreword". In Moreland, Sean (ed.). The Lovecraftian Poe: Essays on Influence, Reception, Interpretation, and Transformation. Bethlehem, Pennsylvania: Lehigh University Press. pp. ix–xiv. ISBN 978-1-61146-241-8. OCLC 973481779.
- Kagle, Steven E. (1990). "The Corpse Within Us". In Fisher, Benjamin Franklin IV (ed.). Poe and His Times: The Artist and His Milieu. Baltimore: The Edgar Allan Poe Society. ISBN 978-0-9616449-2-5.
- Kennedy, J. Gerald (1987). Poe, Death, and the Life of Writing. New Haven: Yale University Press. ISBN 978-0-300-03773-9.
- Koster, Donald N. (2002). "Influences of Transcendentalism on American Life and Literature". In Galens, David (ed.). Literary Movements for Students Vol. 1. Detroit: Thomson Gale. ISBN 978-0-7876-6518-0. OCLC 865552323.
- Krutch, Joseph Wood (1926). Edgar Allan Poe: A Study in Genius. New York: Alfred A. Knopf. (1992 reprint: ISBN 978-0-7812-6835-6)
- Lake, Matt (2006). Weird Maryland. New York: Sterling Publishing. ISBN 978-1-4027-3906-4.
- Lease, Benjamin (1972). That Wild Fellow John Neal and the American Literary Revolution. Chicago, Illinois: University of Chicago Press. ISBN 978-0-226-46969-0.
- Ljunquist, Kent (2002). "The poet as critic". In Hayes, Kevin J. (ed.). The Cambridge Companion to Edgar Allan Poe. Cambridge: Cambridge University Press. pp. 7–20. ISBN 978-0-521-79727-6.
- Maslin, Janet (June 6, 2006). "The Poe Shadow". The New York Times. Archived from the original on May 16, 2013.
- Meyers, Jeffrey (1992). Edgar Allan Poe: His Life and Legacy (Paperback ed.). New York: Cooper Square Press. ISBN 978-0-8154-1038-6.
- Neimeyer, Mark (2002). "Poe and Popular Culture". In Hayes, Kevin J. (ed.). The Cambridge Companion to Edgar Allan Poe. Cambridge: Cambridge University Press. pp. 205–224. ISBN 978-0-521-79727-6.
- New York Daily News (December 5, 2009). "Edgar Allan Poe's first book from 1827 sells for $662,500; record price for American literature". Archived from the original on October 22, 2012.
- New York Times (May 20, 1894). "Emerson's Estimate of Poe". The New York Times. Archived from the original on June 4, 2008.
- Ostrom, John Ward (1987). "Poe's Literary Labors and Rewards". In Fisher, Benjamin Franklin IV (ed.). Myths and Reality: The Mysterious Mr. Poe. Baltimore: The Edgar Allan Poe Society. pp. 37–47. ISBN 978-0-9616449-1-8. Archived from the original on May 15, 2025.
  - Pedersen, Jan B.W. (August 2018). "Howard Phillips Lovecraft: Romantic on the Nightside". Lovecraft Annual (12): 165–173. ISSN 1935-6102. JSTOR 26868565.
- "Celebrate Edgar Allan Poe's 197th Birthday at the Poe museum". PoeMuseum.org. 2006. Archived from the original on January 5, 2009.
- Quinn, Arthur Hobson (1998). Edgar Allan Poe: A Critical Biography. Baltimore: Johns Hopkins University Press. ISBN 978-0-8018-5730-0. Archived from the original on November 14, 2025. (Originally published in 1941 by New York: Appleton-Century-Crofts, Inc.)
- The Raven Society (2014). "History". University of Virginia alumni. Archived from the original on April 15, 2014.
- Rombeck, Terry (January 22, 2005). "Poe's little-known science book reprinted". Lawrence Journal-World & News. Archived from the original on January 1, 2026.
- Rosenheim, Shawn James (1997). The Cryptographic Imagination: Secret Writing from Edgar Poe to the Internet. Baltimore: Johns Hopkins University Press. ISBN 978-0-8018-5332-6.
- Royot, Daniel (2002), "Poe's Humor", in Hayes, Kevin J. (ed.), The Cambridge Companion to Edgar Allan Poe, Cambridge: Cambridge University Press, pp. 57–71, ISBN 978-0-521-79326-1
- Sears, Donald A. (1978). John Neal. Boston: Twayne Publishers. ISBN 978-0-8057-7230-2.
- Silver, Mark (2008). Purloined Letters: Cultural Borrowing and Japanese Crime Literature, 1868-1937. University of Hawaiʻi Press. doi:10.1515/9780824864057. ISBN 978-0-8248-6405-7. JSTOR j.ctt6wqvpd. S2CID 190372684. Project MUSE book 8292.
- Silverman, Kenneth (1991). Edgar A. Poe: Mournful and Never-Ending Remembrance (Paperback ed.). New York: Harper Perennial. ISBN 978-0-06-092331-0.
- Smoot, George; Davidson, Keay (1994). Wrinkles in Time (Reprint ed.). New York: Harper Perennial. ISBN 978-0-380-72044-6.
- Sova, Dawn B. (2001). Edgar Allan Poe A to Z: The Essential Reference to His Life and Work (Paperback ed.). New York: Checkmark Books. ISBN 978-0-8160-4161-9.
- Stableford, Brian (2003). "Science fiction before the genre". In James, Edward; Mendlesohn, Farah (eds.). The Cambridge Companion to Science Fiction. Cambridge: Cambridge University Press. pp. 15–31. ISBN 978-0-521-01657-5.
- St. Armand, Barton Levi (1975). "H. P. Lovecraft: New England Decadent". Caliban. 12 (1): 127–155. doi:10.3406/calib.1975.1046. eISSN 2431-1766. S2CID 220649713. Archived from the original on May 12, 2022.
- Tresch, John (2002). "Extra! Extra! Poe invents science fiction". In Hayes, Kevin J. (ed.). The Cambridge Companion to Edgar Allan Poe. Cambridge: Cambridge University Press. pp. 113–132. ISBN 978-0-521-79326-1.
- Van Hoy, David C. (February 18, 2007). "The Fall of the House of Edgar". The Boston Globe. Archived from the original on October 27, 2020.
- Walsh, John Evangelist (2000) [1968]. Poe the Detective: The Curious Circumstances behind 'The Mystery of Marie Roget'. New York: St. Martins Minotaur. ISBN 978-0-8135-0567-1. (1968 edition printed by Rutgers University Press)
- Weekes, Karen (2002). "Poe's feminine ideal". In Hayes, Kevin J. (ed.). The Cambridge Companion to Edgar Allan Poe. Cambridge: Cambridge University Press. pp. 148–162. ISBN 978-0-521-79326-1.
- Whalen, Terance (2001). "Poe and the American Publishing Industry". In Kennedy, J. Gerald (ed.). A Historical Guide to Edgar Allan Poe. New York: Oxford University Press. pp. 63–94. ISBN 978-0-19-512150-6.
- Wilbur, Richard (1967). "The House of Poe". In Regan, Robert (ed.). Poe: A Collection of Critical Essays. Englewood Cliffs, NJ: Prentice-Hall. p. 99. ISBN 978-0-13-684963-6.
