= Joseph T. Buckingham =

American politician

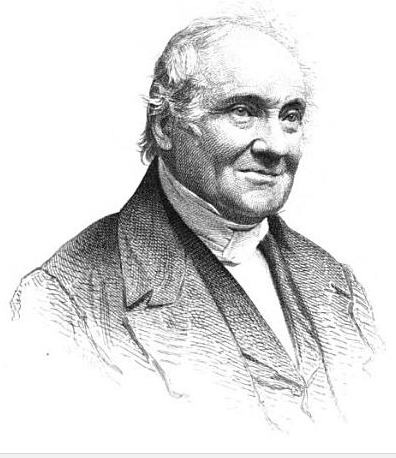
Joseph Tinker Buckingham

Joseph Tinker Buckingham (December 21, 1779 – April 10, 1861) was an American journalist and politician in New England. He rose from humble beginnings to become an influential conservative intellectual in Boston.

== Family and early life ==
Buckingham was born Joseph Buckingham Tinker but christened Joseph Buckingham, with his mother's mother's surname, which he adopted legally in 1804. He was the youngest of nine surviving children of Nehemiah Tinker, a tavern-keeper in Windham, Connecticut, descended from Thomas Tinker, one of the Pilgrim Fathers on the Mayflower. Nehemiah died in 1783, ruined by the devaluing of the Continental currency he received for supplying the Continental Army during the Revolutionary War. Tinker's widow, Mary née Huntington, soon became destitute, until friends offered the family a home in Worthington, Massachusetts.

Joseph was indentured to a farmer named Welsh, where he was kindly treated and got a basic education. After his term, he worked briefly as a printer's devil at the Farmer's Museum in Walpole, New Hampshire, before become an apprentice compositor and copy-editor at the Gazette in Greenfield, Massachusetts. In 1800 he moved to Boston as a journeyman at Thomas & Andrews. In 1803 he played summer stock in Salem, Massachusetts and Providence, Rhode Island. In 1805, he married Melinda Alvord; they had thirteen children.

== Journalism ==
While setting up as a master printer in Boston, Buckingham started and edited two publications: The Polyanthos, an illustrated monthly magazine, which ran from 1806 till September 1807, and 1812 to 1814; and The Ordeal, which ran weekly from January 1809 for six months. These sided with the Federalist Party. He joined the Massachusetts Charitable Mechanic Association and became chairman in 1812; he was vice-president in 1830 and president in 1832. In 1815, he went bankrupt, both his publishing and printing businesses being hit by the War of 1812. The New England Galaxy and Masonic Magazine, started in 1817, was popular among the growing number of Freemasons in Boston. The reference to Freemasonry was dropped by 1820 after a backlash. The magazine supported Josiah Quincy from 1821, as part of the "Middling Interest" coalition after the Panic of 1819. In 1822, Quincy presided over a libel suit brought against Buckingham by John Newland Maffitt.

On 2 March 1824, Buckingham founded the Boston Courier, a daily newspaper which supported protectionism. He sold his interest in the Galaxy in 1828, and edited the Courier till selling out in 1848. It supported the National Republicans, and later the Whig Party. In 1831, he started the monthly The New-England Magazine with his son Edwin. Now considered "one of antebellum America's few worthwhile literary journals", its contributors included Nathaniel Langdon Frothingham, Henry Wadsworth Longfellow, Edward Everett, Samuel Gridley Howe, and Oliver Wendell Holmes. Edwin Buckingham died in 1833, aged 23, on a voyage to Smyrna to relieve his tuberculosis. Joseph sold the magazine in 1834 to Howe and John O. Sargent. He had to mortgage his property in 1836 when business turned bad.

According to a new Abraham Lincoln biography, in 1847 a "special correspondent" from Buckingham's Boston Courier named Joseph H. Buckingham (relationship unknown) depicted one of the very first accounts in the national press of the newly elected Illinois congressman, mocking Lincoln as little more than a country politician: "It seemed as if he knew every thing, and he had a kind word, a smile and a bow for every body on the road, even to the horses and the cattle, and the swine."

== Politics ==
Buckingham served in the Massachusetts House of Representatives for Boston and Cambridge in 1828, 1831–1833, 1836, and 1838–39, as a National Republican, and later a Whig. He introduced a report in 1833 in favor of the suppression of lotteries. He denounced the Tariff of 1833, switching his allegiance from Henry Clay to Daniel Webster.

He represented Middlesex County in the Massachusetts Senate in 1847–48 and 1850–51. He leaned towards the Conscience Whigs but was not an outright abolitionist, though he did oppose the Fugitive Slave Law in the Compromise of 1850.

== Later life ==
After retiring from politics and journalism, Buckingham published two two-volume sets of memoirs, and edited the annals of the Massachusetts Charitable Mechanic Association.
