= Rosalie Mackenzie Poe =

Poet, sister of Edgar Allan Poe

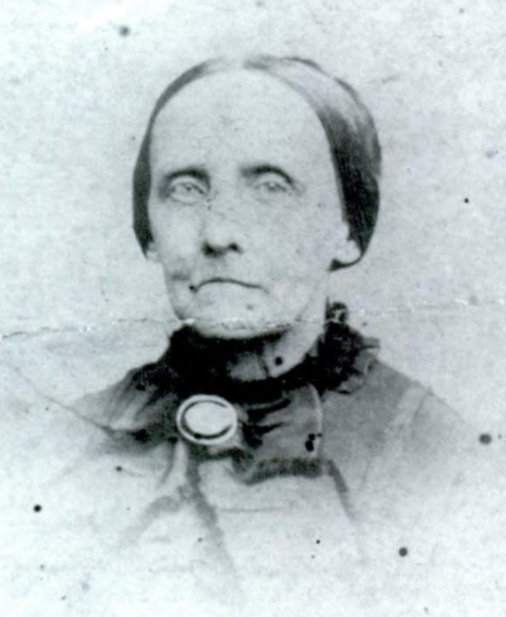
- Poe c. 1872
- Born: Rosalie Poe; December 1810; Norfolk, Virginia, U.S.
- Died: July 21, 1874 (aged 63); Washington, D.C., US
- Resting place: Rock Creek Cemetery; Washington, D.C.
- Parent(s): David Poe Jr. (disputed); Elizabeth Arnold
- Relatives: Edgar Allan Poe (brother); William Leonard Poe (brother)

Rosalie Mackenzie Poe (December 1810 – July 21, 1874) was an American poet and the sister of Edgar Allan Poe.

== Early life and family ==
Poe was born in December 1810 in Norfolk, Virginia, the daughter of English-born actress Elizabeth Arnold Hopkins Poe and American actor David Poe Jr. The family faced financial hardship and her mother suffered from pneumonia and tuberculosis.

Because David Poe had abandoned his family during the period before her birth, questions arose about Rosalie's paternity. Such rumors continued when Joseph Gallego, a wealthy resident of Richmond, Virginia, left the young Rosalie $2,000 in his will when he died in 1818.

In 1811, after the death of her parents, Rosalie was adopted by William and Jane Scott Mackenzie in Richmond. In 1812, she was baptized and christened with the name of Rosalie Mackenzie. During their childhoods, Edgar sometimes visited Rosalie and her schoolmates, reading his satires and poems to them. During her young adulthood, Rosalie taught penmanship at a girl's finishing school in Richmond.

Despite her frequent letters to him, Poe did not remain in close contact with her brother Edgar, with Nathaniel Parker Willis writing to him, "You seem as neglectful of your sister as I am of mine." She did read and enjoy his poems, counting "The Raven" and "The Bells" among her favorites, and took pleasure in being recognized as his sister among the public. When asked for an autograph, Rosalie would sign, "Rose Poe, Sister of the Poet." In 1841, Rosalie visited Edgar while he was living in Philadelphia. In 1849, shortly before his death, Poe traveled to Richmond and visited Rosalie.

After Poe's death in 1849, Rosalie was presumed to be his sole heir, but did not take out the letters of administration required by law in Virginia.

=== Health and financial struggles ===
Based on contemporary writings regarding Rosalie, it is likely that she suffered from depression and alcoholism later in life.

Poe family tree

The fortunes of the Mackenzie family were greatly diminished due to the American Civil War. After the war, Rosalie experienced homelessness and was in ill health, and the Mackenzie family was no longer able to care for her. She traveled between Baltimore and Richmond in hopes of finding relatives to take her in. She also made attempts to gain employment as a housekeeper.

At times and out of necessity, Rosalie sold mementos and photographs of her brother Edgar to passersby. Her primary source of financial support was "the kindness of strangers," motivated to assist her out of admiration for her famous brother.

Rosalie was eventually placed in the care of the Epiphany Church Home in Washington, D.C., where she spent her remaining years.

=== Death ===
Rosalie died at the Epiphany Church Home in 1874 due to inflammation of the stomach. Her burial was arranged by Edgar Allan Poe fans who marked her birthyear on the tombstone as 1812, the year of her christening. She wished to be buried near her brother's grave in Baltimore, but was instead buried at Rock Creek Cemetery.

== Writings ==
According to the Edgar Allan Poe Society of Baltimore, Rosalie wrote several untitled poems that were not published until over 50 years after her death. Selected poems are below.

Fare thee well, may peace attend thee,
Hope each cheering influence lend thee,
May heaven from every ill defend thee
And bless the home that holds my friend.

Though we may never meet again
Thy image I will long retain
And whilst thy goodness I commend
My heart with pride shall call thee Friend.

— Rosalie Mackenzie Poe, Untitled Poem

The second poem was published in the Chicago Step Ladder in 1927.

Yon rose that wears the blush of morn
Which glittering drops of dew adorn
Of various hue,
Whilst its chaste beauties I survey
Its fragrance sip as Zephyrs play
I think of you.

Yon violet too, that gives delight
Presenting to the enraptured sight
A matchless blue,
Whilst gazing mute it often brings
Upon my view on fancy's wings
The form of you.

When each fair flower I behold
Which to mine eyes its charms unfold
In shining dew,
Or wafted on the gentle gale
Its odors o'er the air prevail
I think of you.

— Rosalie Mackenzie Poe, Untitled Poem

== In popular culture ==
Her brother William (= Henry) named a character "Rosalie" after her in his 1827 short story, "The Pirate," published in the Weekly Journal of Politics, Science, and Literature. He also mentioned Rosalie in his 1827 poem "Lines on a Pocket Book."

Rosalie is a character in the 1909 historical fiction novel, The Dreamer, by Mary Newton Stanard.

Rosalie is portrayed by a child actor in the 1915 silent biographical film, The Raven.

Rosalie was portrayed by Beth Graham in the original cast of the Off-Broadway musical, Nevermore: The Imaginary Life and Mysterious Death of Edgar Allan Poe.

Rosalie is a character in the 2003 gothic horror mystery novel The Pale Blue Eye by Louis Bayard, but does not appear in its 2022 film adaptation.

Rosalie is a character in the 2011 romance and ghost novel, The Raven's Bride, by Lenore Hart (St. Martin's Publishing Group).
