= David Poe Jr. =

American actor and father of poet Edgar Allan Poe (1784–1811)

- Born: July 18, 1784; Baltimore, Maryland, U.S.
- Died: December 11, 1811 (aged 27) (disputed)
- Occupation: Actor
- Spouse: Eliza Arnold (m. 1806)
- Children: William Henry Leonard Poe; Edgar Allan Poe; Rosalie Mackenzie Poe (disputed)
- Parent(s): David Poe Sr. Elizabeth Cairnes
- Relatives: Maria Poe Clemm (sister)

David Poe Jr. (July 18, 1784 – December 11, 1811 [speculative]) was an American actor and the father of Edgar Allan Poe.

== Biography ==
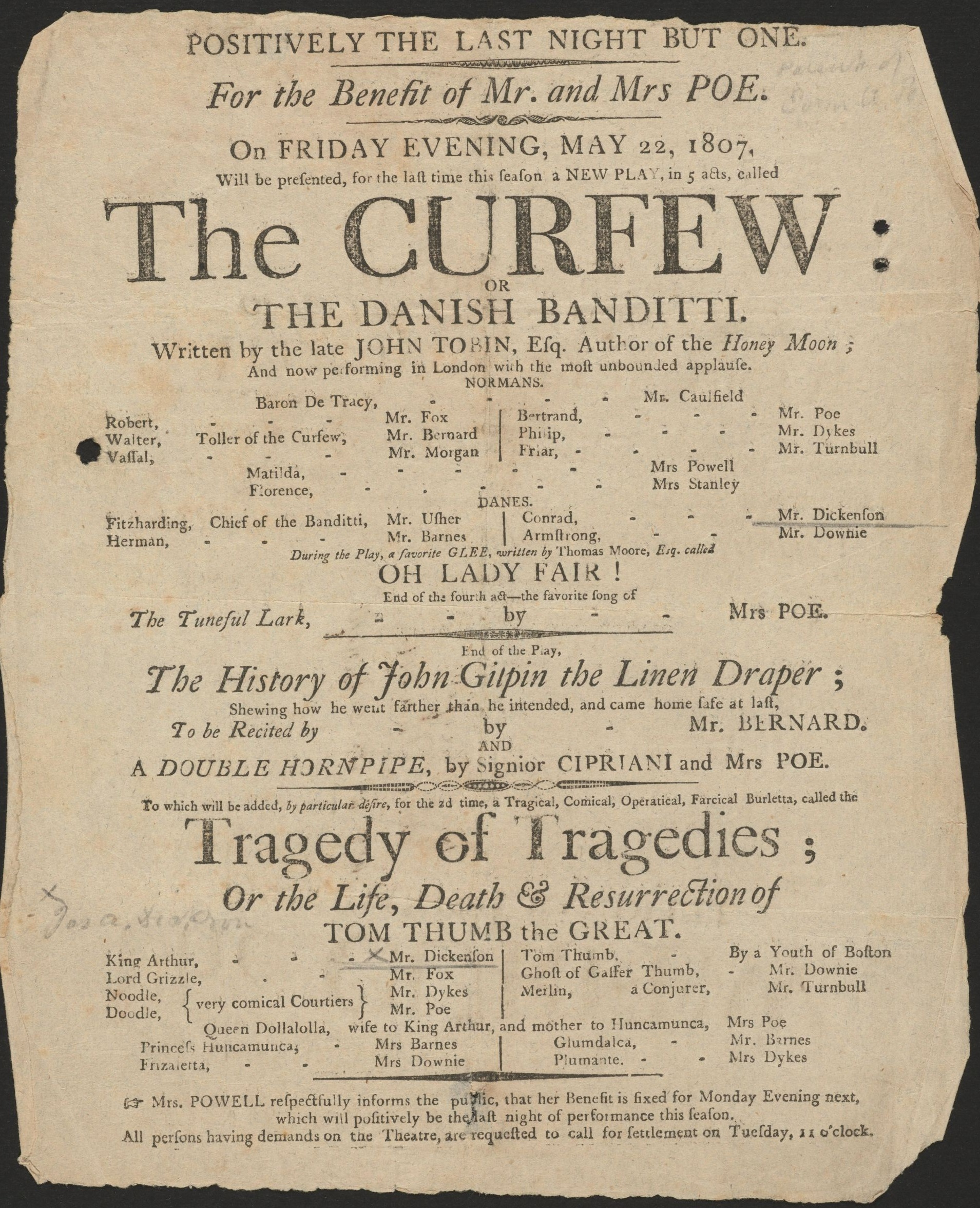
Playbill for The Curfew, presented "For the Benefit of Mr. and Mrs. Poe" on May 27, 1807

Poe was born in Baltimore, Maryland. His father, David Poe Sr., had emigrated from Dring in Kildallan parish, County Cavan, Ireland, to the United States around the year 1750, and was well known for his patriotic self-sacrifice as a quartermaster during the American Revolution, paying for supplies out of his own pocket, including $500 for clothing for the troops. Poe Sr.'s commitment had earned the respect and friendship of the Marquis de Lafayette and the honorary title of 'General'. The younger David Poe, on the other hand, defied his family's wishes to become a lawyer and became an actor instead.

In 1806, David Jr. married the English-born Eliza Hopkins, née Arnold, whose first husband, Charles Hopkins, had died six months before. Poe was considered an inferior actor compared to his wife, possibly due to stage fright. One critic said of Eliza and David, "the lady was young and pretty, and evinced talent both as a singer and actress; the gentleman was literally nothing." The couple's eldest child, William Henry Leonard Poe, was born in Boston, Massachusetts on January 30, 1807, nine months after their wedding.

After the birth of their second son Edgar Allan Poe on January 19, 1809, the family ran low on money. An ill-tempered alcoholic for much of his adult life, David Jr. abandoned the stage and his family some time before July 1809, disappearing from historical record. In David's absence, Eliza gave birth to a daughter in December 1810, but the true paternity of Rosalie Poe remains uncertain. Edgar Allan Poe, however, clearly names Rosalie Poe as his sister and the daughter of David Poe Jr.

In an 1835 letter from Edgar Allan Poe, he wrote, "My father David died in the second year of my age, and when my sister Rosalie was an infant in arms". According to author Susan Talley Weiss, Poe died on December 11, 1811, only three days after Eliza's death.

After Eliza's death in 1811, the three children were split up. Henry lived with his paternal grandparents in Baltimore, Edgar was fostered by John and Frances Allan in Richmond, Virginia, and Rosalie was adopted by William and Jane Scott Mackenzie, also in Richmond.
