= Eliza Poe =

Mother of Edgar Allan Poe (1787–1811)

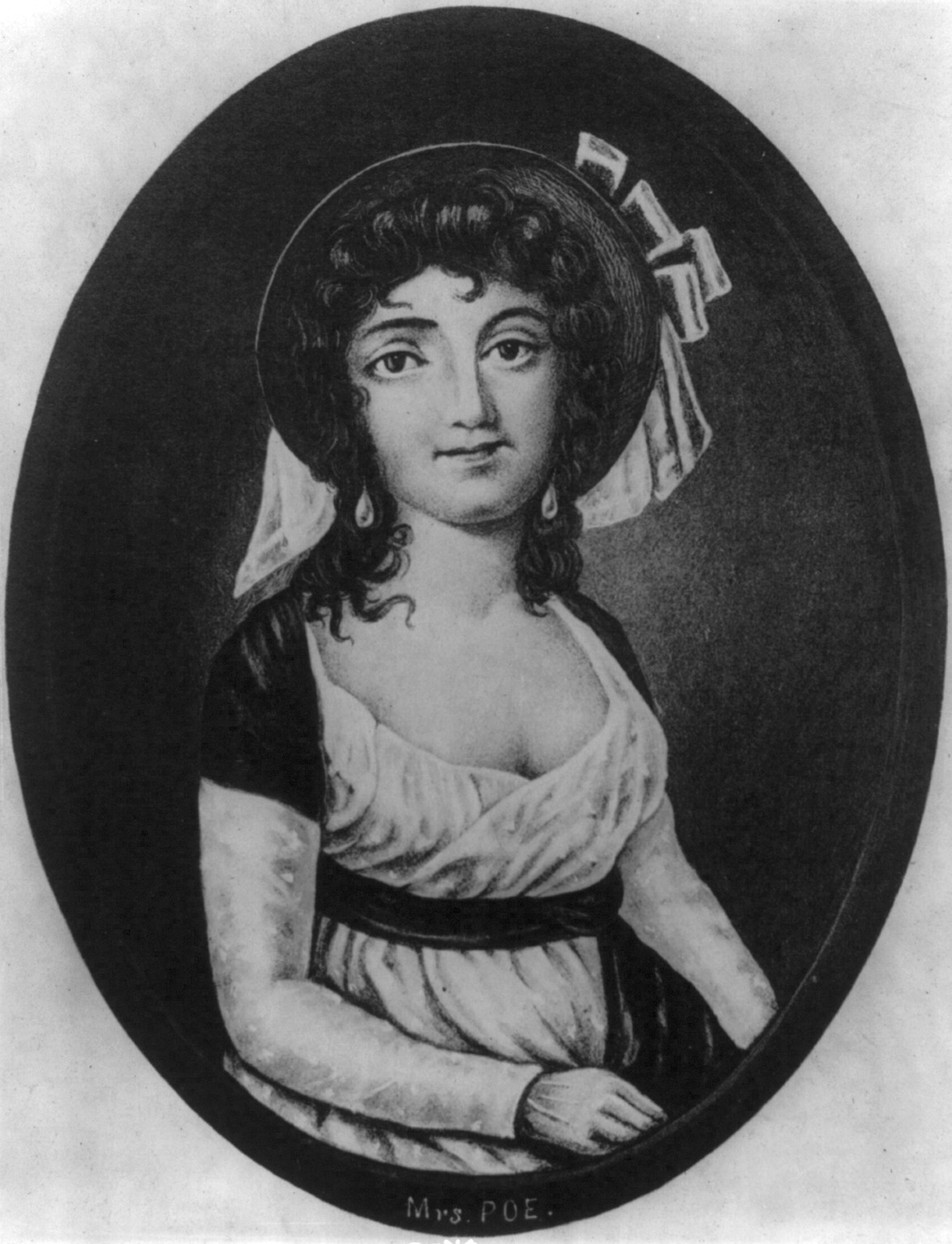
- The only known image of Eliza Poe
- Born: Elizabeth Arnold; June 7, 1788; Westminster, England
- Died: December 8, 1811 (aged 23); Richmond, Virginia, U.S.
- Resting place: St. John's Episcopal Church (Richmond, Virginia)
- Occupation: Actress
- Years active: 1796–1811
- Spouses: Charles Hopkins (m. 1802; died 1805); David Poe Jr. (m. 1806–1811)
- Children: William; Edgar; Rosalie

Eliza Poe (née Elizabeth Arnold; formerly Hopkins; June 7, 1788 – December 8, 1811) was an English-American actress and the mother of the American author Edgar Allan Poe.

== Early life ==
The Poe family tree

Arnold was born to Henry and Elizabeth Arnold in England. She was baptized into the Church of England at St Martin-in-the-Fields, Westminster, on August 8, 1788, when her date of birth was noted as June 7. Her mother was a stage actress in London from 1791 to 1795. Her father, Henry, is thought to have died in 1790 and may be the Henry Arnold from the parish of St Clement Danes, Westminster, buried on February 15, 1790, at St Dunstan-in-the-West, in the City of London. In November 1795, Eliza and her mother sailed from England to Boston, Massachusetts, where they arrived on January 3, 1796.

== Career ==
=== Boston ===
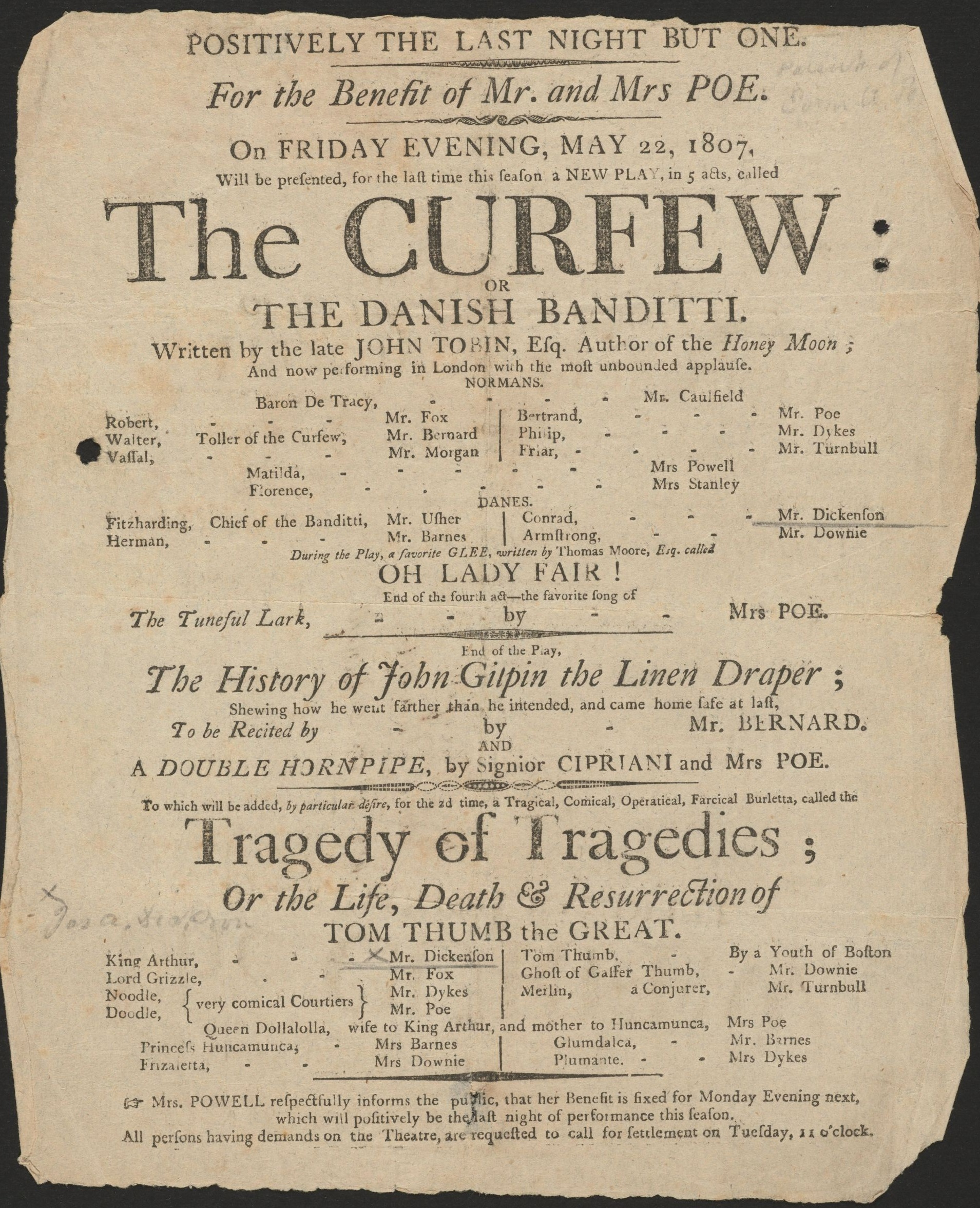
Playbill for The Curfew, presented "For the Benefit of Mr. and Mrs. Poe" on May 27, 1807

In Boston, Arnold debuted on stage at the age of nine, only three months after she arrived in the United States. She played a character named Biddy Blair in David Garrick's farce Miss in Her Teens and was praised in the Portland Herald: "Miss Arnold, in Miss Biddy, exceeded all praise.. Although a miss of only nine years old, her powers as an Actress will do credit to any of her sex of maturer age". Later that year, Eliza's mother Elizabeth married musician Charles Tubbs, who had sailed with the Arnolds from England. The small family partnered with a manager, Mr. Edgar, to form a theater troupe called the Charleston Comedians. Elizabeth died sometime while this troupe was traveling through North Carolina. Little is known about her death—but she vanishes from theatrical records in 1798, and it is presumed that she died shortly after this disappearance.

After her mother's death, Eliza stayed with the theater troupe. She followed the tradition of the time, where actors would travel from city to city to perform for several months before moving on. The actors, theaters, and audiences had a wide range of sophistication. One of the most impressive venues at which she performed was the Chestnut Street Theater near Independence Hall in Philadelphia, which seated 2,000. Over the course of her career she played (not including choral and dancing roles) some 300 parts—including the characters Juliet Capulet and Ophelia from the works of Shakespeare.

=== Marriage and children ===
In the summer of 1802, at the age of fifteen, Eliza married Charles Hopkins. Hopkins died three years later in October 1805, possibly of yellow fever, leaving Eliza an 18-year-old widow. The Baltimore-born David Poe Jr. saw Eliza performing in Norfolk, Virginia, and decided to join her acting troupe, abandoning his family's plans for him to study law. Poe married Eliza only six months after Hopkins died in 1806.

The couple traveled throughout New England and the rest of the northeast, playing in various towns such as Richmond, Philadelphia, and at an outdoor summer theater in New York City, before finally settling in Boston. They stayed in Boston for three consecutive seasons of thirty weeks each in a theater that could seat an audience of about one thousand. Reviews at the time often remarked on Eliza's "interesting figure" and "sweetly melodious voice".

Though times were difficult, the couple had two sons; William Henry Leonard was born in January 1807, nine months after their wedding, and Edgar was born on January 19, 1809, at a boarding house near Boston Common, close to where their troupe was performing. Eliza performed until 10 days before Edgar's birth and may have named her second son after the Mr. Edgar who led the Charleston Comedians.

=== New York City ===
The family relocated to New York City in the summer of 1809. Eliza had often been praised for her acting ability while David's performances were routinely criticized harshly, possibly due to his own stage fright. David, an ill-tempered alcoholic, abandoned the stage and his family about six weeks after moving to New York. Though David's fate is unknown, there is some evidence to suggest he died in Norfolk, Virginia, on December 11, 1811. Eliza gave birth to a third child, a daughter she called Rosalie, in December 1810. Eliza continued traveling as she performed.

== Death ==
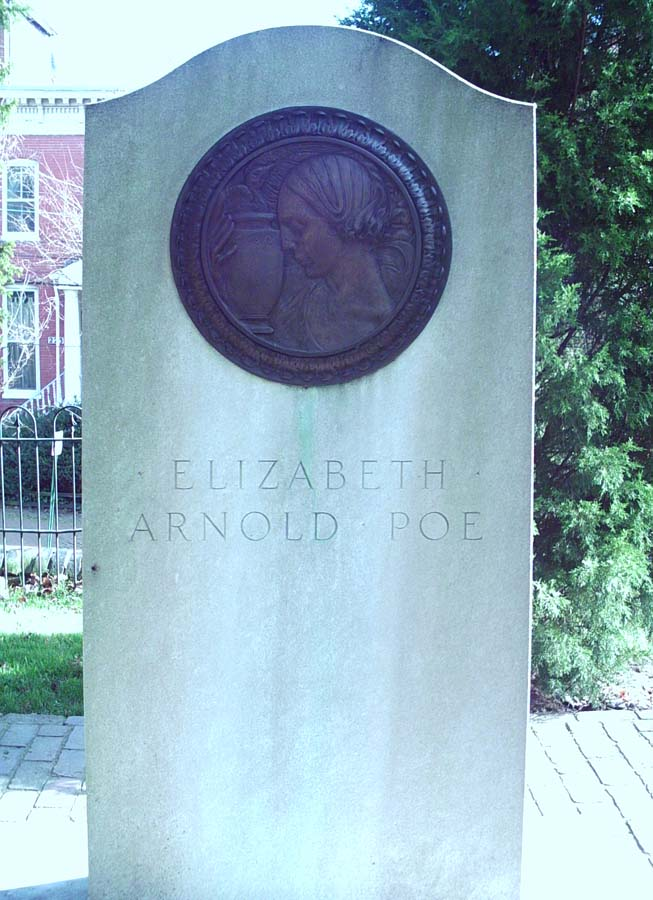
Memorial marker for Eliza Arnold Poe in Richmond, Virginia

In 1811, while staying at a boarding house in Richmond, Virginia, for a performance, Eliza began spitting blood. Her performances became less frequent until October 1811, when she stopped appearing altogether. Her last performance was on October 11, 1811, as Countess Wintersen in a play called The Stranger.

Friends and fellow actors Mr. and Mrs. Luke Usher (the name may have inspired Poe's tale "The Fall of the House of Usher") took care of the children during Eliza's illness. Many in the Richmond area took an interest in her health. On November 29 of that year, the Richmond Theater announced a benefit performance on her behalf. A local publication, the Enquirer, reported her need for help: "On this night, Mrs. Poe, lingering on the bed of disease and surrounded by her children, asks your assistance and asks it perhaps for the last time".

Eliza finally died on the morning of Sunday, December 8, 1811, at the age of twenty-four, surrounded by her children. It is generally assumed that she died of tuberculosis. She is buried at St. John's Episcopal Church in Richmond. Though her actual burial place is unknown, a memorial marks the general area.

After her death, her three children were split up. William Henry Leonard Poe lived with his paternal grandparents in Baltimore. Edgar Poe was taken in by John and Frances Allan in Richmond. Rosalie Poe was adopted by William and Jane Scott Mackenzie in Richmond, Virginia.

== Legacy ==
Though he was young when she died, Edgar Allan Poe was heavily affected by Eliza Poe's death, and many of his works reflect her influence. His first published work, "Metzengerstein" features a fire burning down a large home, possibly reflecting the fire that destroyed the Richmond Theatre, where she had performed. The fire occurred in December 1811, only three weeks after her death.

The early loss of his mother and other women, including his wife Virginia, may also have inspired Edgar Poe's often-used literary theme of dying women. This theme is readily present in works such as "The Raven".

== Sources ==
- Meyers, Jeffrey. Edgar Allan Poe: His Life and Legacy. New York City: Cooper Square Press, 1992. ISBN 0-8154-1038-7.
- Silverman, Kenneth. Edgar A. Poe: Mournful and Never-ending Remembrance. New York City: Harper Perennial, 1991. ISBN 0-06-092331-8.
- Sova, Dawn B. Edgar Allan Poe: A to Z. New York: Checkmark Books, 2001. ISBN 0-8160-4161-X.
- Stashower, Daniel. The Beautiful Cigar Girl: Mary Rogers, Edgar Allan Poe, and the Invention of Murder. New York: Dutton, 2006. ISBN 0-525-94981-X.
