= Creepy Canada =

Canadian tv series (2002–2006)

- Also known as: Hauntings and Horrors (Destination America airings)
- Genre: Paranormal; Reality TV
- Created by: William P. Burke
- Written by: Karen Gordon, Mandy Forbes, Indra Seja, Paul Vella, Paulette Bourgeols, Joshua Clavir, Steve Abbott
- Directed by: William Burke, Paul Vella, Chad Archibald, John Garrett, Simon Gebski
- Starring: Terry Boyle (2002–2004); Brian O'Dea (2006)
- Narrated by: Stewart Yorke; David Pritchard
- Composer: boomKA!
- Country of origin: Canada
- Original language: English
- No. of seasons: 3
- No. of episodes: 30 (list of episodes)

Production
- Executive producer: Stephen Paul Wagner
- Cinematography: Roger Singh; Kamil Chrapowicki
- Editors: Christopher Brown; Jessica Bahia; Michael Patterson; Sound Supervisor: Jeff McCormack
- Running time: 60 minutes (with commercials)

Original release
- Network: OLN; Destination America (U.S.)
- Release: October 23, 2002 – July 28, 2006

Creepy Canada is a Canadian television series that aired on OLN. It focused on paranormal activities around Canada. The show first premiered on October 23, 2002, and began its third season on May 5, 2006. With the third season, the show's scope was expanded to include paranormal activity reported in the United States. Creepy Canada was originally hosted by Terry Boyle. The show was later hosted by Brian O'Dea, who was also the producer of the show.

Creepy Canada's last episode aired on July 28, 2006; the show has stopped producing new episodes.

In 2014, Destination America aired the series under an alternate title called Hauntings and Horrors.

== Episode list ==
=== Season 1 (2002) ===
Ep. #	Episode Title	Original Airdate
1.1	Creepy Canada	October 23, 2002
Locations	Ottawa Youth Hostel, Ottawa, Ontario; "The Young Teaser", Mahone Bay, Nova Scotia; Ghost of Ann Crosby, Watson's Mill, Manotick, Ontario; Ghosts at Brockamour Willow Inn, Niagara-on-the-Lake, Ontario	
1.2	Creepy Canada	October 30, 2002
Locations	Ghosts at Fort George, Fort George, Ontario; Ghost Road, Scugog and Port Perry, Ontario; Ghosts at Five Fisherman Restaurant, Halifax, Nova Scotia; Ghosts at Washington Avenue Grill, White Rock, British Columbia	
1.3	Creepy Canada	November 6, 2002
Locations	Ghost of Cornelius Driscoll at Morton Brewery, Kingston, Ontario; Ghosts at The Cellar Bar and Grill Restaurant, Halifax, Nova Scotia; Ghosts of school children, Qualicum Heritage Inn, Qualicum Beach, British Columbia; Ghosts at Deadman Bay, Kingston, Ontario	
1.4	Creepy Canada	November 13, 2002
Locations	Sightings of Sasquatch in British Columbia; Ghosts at Emma's Back Porch, Burlington, Ontario; Maritime UFOs in Canada; Ghosts at Fort Henry, Fort Henry, Ontario; Ghosts at Cherry Bank Hotel, Victoria, British Columbia	
1.5	Creepy Canada	November 20, 2002
Locations	Ghosts at Four Mile House, Victoria, British Columbia; The Halifax Club, Halifax, Nova Scotia; Ghosts at the Bytown Museum, Ottawa, Ontario; Ghosts at White Rock Players Club, White Rock, British Columbia; Ghost at Princess Mary Restaurant, Victoria, British Columbia	
1.6	Creepy Canada	November 27, 2002
Locations	The Genii (Genies) sightings); Ghosts at Beban House, Nanaimo, British Columbia; Ghost at Sax's Fish and Chips Restaurant, Keswick, Ontario; Memphre Lake Monster, Lake Memphremagog, Quebec	

=== Season 2 (2003-2004) ===
Ep. #	Episode Title	Original Airdate
2.1	Creepy Canada	October 28, 2003
Locations	Ghost of John Paul Radelmuller, Gibraltar Point Lighthouse, Toronto Islands, Toronto, Ontario; Ghost of Major Temple McDonald, The King's Playhouse, Georgetown, Prince Edward Island; Ghost of Jimmy McOuat, White Otter Castle, White Otter Lake, near Ignace, Ontario; Ghosts at Mackenzie Inn, Kirkfield, Kawartha Lakes, Ontario; Ghost of Marie Corriveau, Quebec City, Quebec	
2.2	Creepy Canada	November 4, 2003
Locations	The Ghosts of Rue St. Paul, Montreal, Quebec; Ghosts at The Fairmont Algonquin Resort, St. Andrews, New Brunswick; Wendigo of Fort Kent, Fort Kent, Alberta; Ghosts at Kingston Penitentiary, Kingston, Ontario; Ghost at Victoria Golf Course, Victoria, British Columbia; Ghost at The Duford House, Cumberland, Ontario	
2.3	Creepy Canada	November 11, 2003
Locations	Ghosts at Ukrainian Village, Alberta; Ghosts at Firkins House, Fort Edmonton Park, Edmonton, Alberta; "Lady in Blue" Ghost, Peggys Cove, Nova Scotia; Walker Theatre, Winnipeg, Manitoba; Ghosts at Bastion Square, Victoria, British Columbia; Cathedral of the Holy Trinity, Quebec City, Quebec	
2.4	Creepy Canada	November 18, 2003
Locations	Frank Slide (rockslide), Frank, Alberta, Northwest Territories; Ghosts at Trowbridge Falls, Thunder Bay, Ontario; Ghost at Charlotte County Court House, Charlotte County, New Brunswick; Manipogo Lake Monster, Lake Manitoba, Manitoba; Ghost of Minnie Latham Hopkins at Hopkins Dining Parlour, Moose Jaw, Saskatchewan	
2.5	Creepy Canada	November 25, 2003
Locations	Ghosts at Newman Wine Vaults, Newfoundland and Labrador; Campbell Family Disappearance, North Bay, Ontario; The Wilno Ghost, Wilno, Ontario; Ghosts in Chez Brian Restaurant, St. John's, Newfoundland and Labrador; Fort de l'Île Sainte-Hélène, Fort Stewart, Montreal, Quebec; Ghosts at Helmcken House in Thunderbird Park, Victoria, British Columbia; Ghost at Heritage Restaurant, Cumberland, Ontario	
2.6	Creepy Canada	December 2, 2003
Locations	Screaming Tunnel, Niagara Falls, Ontario; The Hamilton Archives, Hamilton, Ontario; Ghosts at Discovery Harbour, Penetanguishene, Ontario; Ghost of Francis Nicholson Darke, Darke Hall, Regina, Saskatchewan; Ghosts at Pioneer Square, Victoria, British Columbia; Ghosts at The Rouge Restaurant, Calgary, Alberta	
2.7	Creepy Canada	December 9, 2003
Locations	The Sea Hag of Bell Island, Newfoundland and Labrador; Ghosts at The Empress Theatre, Fort Macleod, Alberta; The Wilno Vampire, Wilno, Ontario; Ghost at Angel Inn, Niagara-on-the-Lake, Ontario; Ghosts at Magnetic Hill, Magnetic Hill Neighborhood, Moncton, New Brunswick; Ghosts at the Mathers-Walls House, Kenora, Lake of the Woods, Northwestern Ontario	
2.8	Creepy Canada	April 20, 2004
Locations	The Last Duel, St. John's, Newfoundland and Labrador; Ghosts at Mathers House, Burnaby, British Columbia; The Headless Captain of Queens Road, St. John's, Newfoundland and Labrador; Ghost at Assiniboia Club, Regina, Saskatchewan; Albion Falls, Niagara Escarpment, Red Hill Valley, Hamilton, Ontario	
2.9	Creepy Canada	April 27, 2004
Locations	UFO sighting at Falcon Lake Landing, Whiteshell Provincial Park, Manitoba; Ghosts at Fort Qu'Appelle, Saskatchewan; Blue Tunnel, Welland Canal, Port Weller, Ontario; Ghost at Ceperley House, Burnaby, British Columbia; Theresa Ignace Beam Alley, Kingston, Ontario; Ghost at Charlotte County Gaol, Charlotte County, New Brunswick	
2.10	Creepy Canada	May 4, 2004
Locations	Ghosts at Bell Island Iron Ore Mines, Bell Island, Newfoundland and Labrador; Ghost at The Mallard Lodge, Portage la Prairie, Manitoba; Ghosts at Hermitage Ruins, Ancaster, Ontario; 1234 De La Montagne, Montreal, Quebec; Ghosts at Drummond Hill Cemetery, Niagara Falls, Ontario; Ghost at The Marr Residence, Saskatoon, Saskatchewan	
2.11	Creepy Canada	May 11, 2004
Locations	Ghost of a Monkey, The Hose and Hound Pub, Calgary, Alberta; Ghosts of children, The McKay Avenue School, Edmonton, Alberta; Hotel Fort Garry, Winnipeg, Manitoba; Ghost of a pregnant woman, Inn at the Falls, Bracebridge, Ontario; Hatley Castle, Hatley Park National Historic Site, Colwood, British Columbia; Ghosts at The Deane House, Calgary, Alberta	

=== Season 3 (2006) ===
Ep. #	Episode Title	Original Airdate
3.1	Goatman: Prince George's County Maryland	September 21, 2006
Locations	The Legend of the Goatman, near Washington, DC; The Banshee of Marrtown, Marrtown, West Virginia; The Listowell Ripper, Listowel, Ontario	
3.2	The Grave of Edgar Allan Poe	September 22, 2006
Locations	Grave of Edgar Allan Poe, Westminster Hall and Burying Ground and Edgar Allan Poe House and Museum, Baltimore, Maryland; Ghost of the Silver Run Tunnel, Parkersburg, West Virginia; Isle of Demons, Quirpon, Newfoundland and Labrador	
3.3	Sanitarium/Headless Nun	September 25, 2006
Locations	Waverly Hills Sanitarium, Louisville, Kentucky; The Headless Nun of Miramichi, French Fort Cove, Nordin, New Brunswick; The Burlington Bay Ghost, Hamilton Harbour, Lake Ontario	
3.4	Lift Lock/Queen of the Dead	September 26, 2006
Locations	Peterborough Lift Lock, Peterborough, Ontario, Ghost of Nancy Coyle, Queen of the Dead - St. John's, Newfoundland and Labrador, Kelly Green Men Incident, Hopkinsville, Kentucky; Viking Ghost Boat, L'Anse aux Meadows, Newfoundland	
3.5	Ghosts/Penitentiary	September 27, 2006
Locations	Fortress Louisbourgh, Louisbourg, Cape Breton Island, Nova Scotia; Moundsville Penitentiary, Moundsville, West Virginia; U.S.S. Constellation, Baltimore, Maryland	
3.6	Missing Time in Kelowna/Cemetery Gates	September 28, 2006
Locations	Missing Time in Kelowna, Kelowna, British Columbia; Cemetery Gates, Wappingers Falls, New York; Chickie's Rock, Columbia, Pennsylvania	
3.7	UFO/Bigfoot	September 29, 2006
Locations	UFO and Bigfoot sightings, Greensburg, Pennsylvania; The Dungarvon Whooper, Dungarvon River, New Brunswick	
3.8	Fort Saskatchewan/Laurel Caverns	June 11, 2006
Locations	The Ghost of "Mob Princess" Florence Lassandro, Fort Saskatchewan, Alberta; Ghosts at the Laurel Caverns, Farmington, Pennsylvania; Poltergeist at Mary Ellen spook farm (current campground), Caledonia Mills, Nova Scotia; "Hanging House" - Gallows Hill Home (Price-Gause House), Wilmington, North Carolina	
3.9	Kent Cliffs/Mission/Devils	June 18, 2006
Locations	Kent Cliffs, Kent, New York; Ghost at Lac La Biche Mission, Lac La Biche, Alberta; Devil's Stairs, Ashe County, North Carolina; Ghost of Mary Gallagher, Montreal, Quebec	
3.10	Cornwall Jail/Samuel Joce	July 7, 2006
Locations	Ghosts of Cornwall Jail, Cornwall, Ontario; Ghost of Samuel Jocelyn, Wilmington, North Carolina; Skeleton Park, Kingston, Ontario	
3.11	Sasquatch Canada/Swamp	July 14, 2006
Locations	Sasquatch sightings, Banff National Park, Rocky Mountains, Alberta; Great Dismal Swamp, Elizabeth City, North Carolina; Ghosts in Customs House, Hamilton, Ontario	
3.12	Fiddler's Green/T. Thomson	July 21, 2006
Locations	Fiddler's Green Pub at Old Galt Post Office, Galt, Ontario; The ghost of Tom Thomson, Algonquin Wilderness Park, Central Ontario; Screaming Doppelganger of Beacon Hill Park, Victoria, British Columbia; Mysteries of Mockbegger (Bradley House, Moses Point, Mockbegger Coffins), Bonavista Bay, Newfoundland and Labrador	
3.13	Keefer House/Pennyland	July 28, 2006
Locations	Fan Tan Alley, Chinatown, Victoria, British Columbia; Keefer Mansion in Thorold, Ontario; Pennyland Amusement Park, Manitoba, Canada; (Note: This episode uses footage of the defunct Rocky Springs Amusement Park in Lancaster, Pennsylvania. The Pennyland Amusement Park never existed.)	
