= Turtle River–White Otter Lake Provincial Park =

Provincial park in Ontario, Canada

- IUCN category II (national park)
- Location within Ontario
- Location: Kenora and Rainy River Districts, Ontario, Canada
- Coordinates: 49°12′30″N 92°07′15″W
- Area: 49,294 ha (190.33 sq mi)
- Designation: Waterway
- Established: 1989
- Governing body: Ontario Parks
- Website: www.ontarioparks.com/park/turtleriverwhiteotterlake

The Turtle River–White Otter Lake Provincial Park is a large provincial park in Kenora and Rainy River Districts, roughly located between Ignace and Atikokan, Ontario, Canada. It has been recognized as a "natural area with unique biophysical, recreational, and cultural attributes".

The park, originally called Turtle River Provincial Park, was established in 1989 and had an area of 40,052 hectares (98,970 acres) at that time. It was created to protect the Turtle River canoe route. In 2003, the park was enlarged to 49,294 hectares (121,810 acres) and renamed to its current name.

The Turtle River–White Otter Lake Provincial Park is a non-operating park. Facilities available include 3 boat launches, 15 docks, and 150 backcountry campsites. Permitted activities include boating, canoeing, fishing, and hunting. In the winter, dogsledding, snowmobiling, and snowshoeing are allowed.

== Description ==
The park protects a series of lakes, the largest of which are White Otter, Eltrut, McNamara, Dibble, Smirch, and Jones Lakes. It also includes the shores and waters of the Turtle River and Big Turtle River from White Otter Lake to Little Turtle Lake, as well as all the lakes along its course.

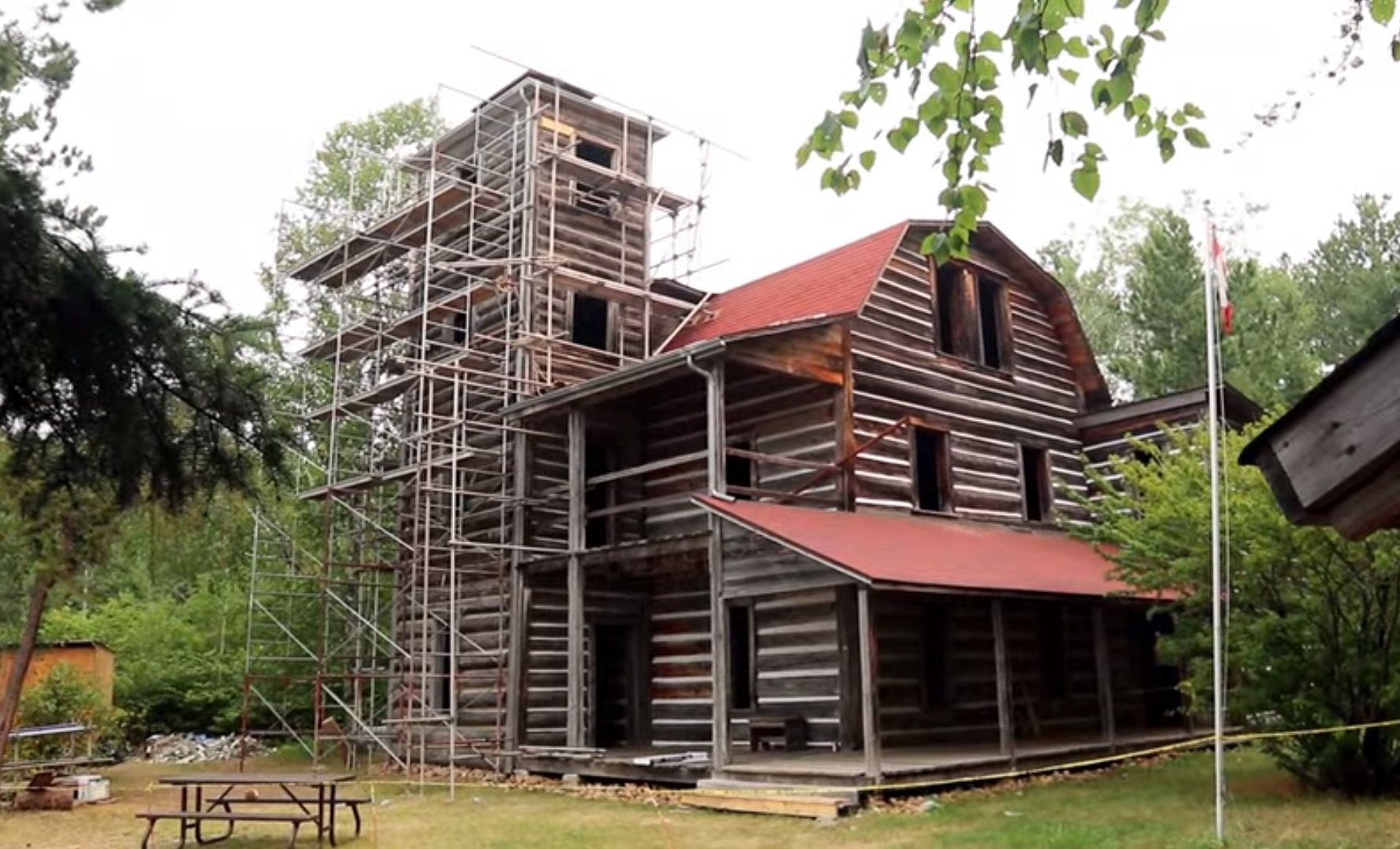
White Otter Castle, 2021

Notable features of the park include:

- Turtle River canoe route, that starts at McNamara Lake and proceeds with a portage over the height-of-land to the Balmoral River, a tributary of the Turtle River at Dibble Lake. The Turtle River, with some 22 sets of rapids and 30 portages, has been a significant travel and trade route for centuries.
- Aboriginal pictographs/rock art along the waterways.
- White Otter Castle, an elaborate 3-storey log house built single-handedly by a hermit in the 1910s. Although not accessible by road, it draws between 5,000 and 7,000 people each year, making it the park's most popular attraction.
- Remains of Prisoner of War Camp, a former logging camp from the 1930s adapted during the Second World War to house German sailors, located just north of White Otter Castle.

Along the north shore of White Otter Lake, the park abuts the White Otter Enhanced Management Area (an undeveloped area set aside for potential future tourism opportunities and where logging operations are kept to a minimal) and the Campus Lake Conservation Reserve (a 19,452 ha (48,070 acres) reserve with "spectacular scenic and recreational areas" that harmonize with the park).

== Flora and fauna ==
Common trees in the park include balsam fir, black spruce, jack pine, trembling aspen, white birch, and white spruce, with some stands of red and white pine. Hardwood trees, such as black ash, elm, and red maple, are found in valleys, while eastern white cedar is widespread along lake shores. Provincially rare vegetation found in the park are dwarf birch, fir-clubmoss, water dock, and winter bentgrass.

Animals found in the park include beaver, black bear, eastern chipmunk, fisher, fox, lynx, marten, mink, moose, muskrat, river otter, red squirrel, white-tailed deer, and wolf. Bird species include least flycatcher, red-eyed vireo, Swainson's thrush, winter wren, white-throated sparrow, and yellow-rumped warbler, as well as the provincially-rare bald eagle and caspian tern.

Among the fish species present in the lakes and rivers are lake trout, northern pike, smallmouth bass, and walleye.
