= Westminster Hall and Burying Ground =

Historic site in Baltimore, Maryland, US

- Westminster Presbyterian Church and Cemetery
- U.S. National Register of Historic Places
- U.S. Historic district
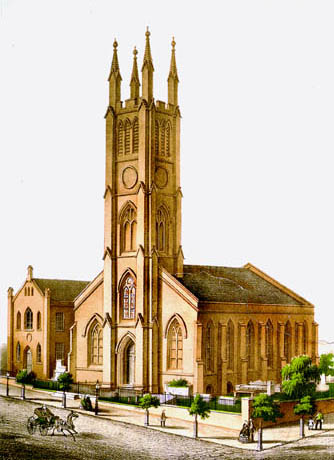
- Westminster Presbyterian Church, (Baltimore, Maryland) c. 1857

- Location within Baltimore Location within Maryland Location within the United States
- Location: 509 West Fayette Street at North Greene Street, Baltimore, Maryland
- Coordinates: 39°17′24″N 76°37′26″W
- Area: 1 acre (0.40 ha)
- Built: 1815; 211 years ago
- Architect: Godefroy, Maximilien; et al.
- Architectural style: Greek Revival, Exotic Revival, Gothic Revival
- NRHP reference No.: 74002218
- Added to NRHP: September 17, 1974

Westminster Hall and Burying Ground is a graveyard and former church located at 519 West Fayette Street (at North Greene Street) in Baltimore, Maryland, United States. It is currently part of the grounds of the University of Maryland's School of Law. It occupies the southeast corner of West Fayette and North Greene Street on the west side of downtown Baltimore. It sits across from the Baltimore VA hospital and is the burial site of Edgar Allan Poe (1809–1849) and several politicians and military officials. The complex was declared a national historic district in 1974.

== History ==
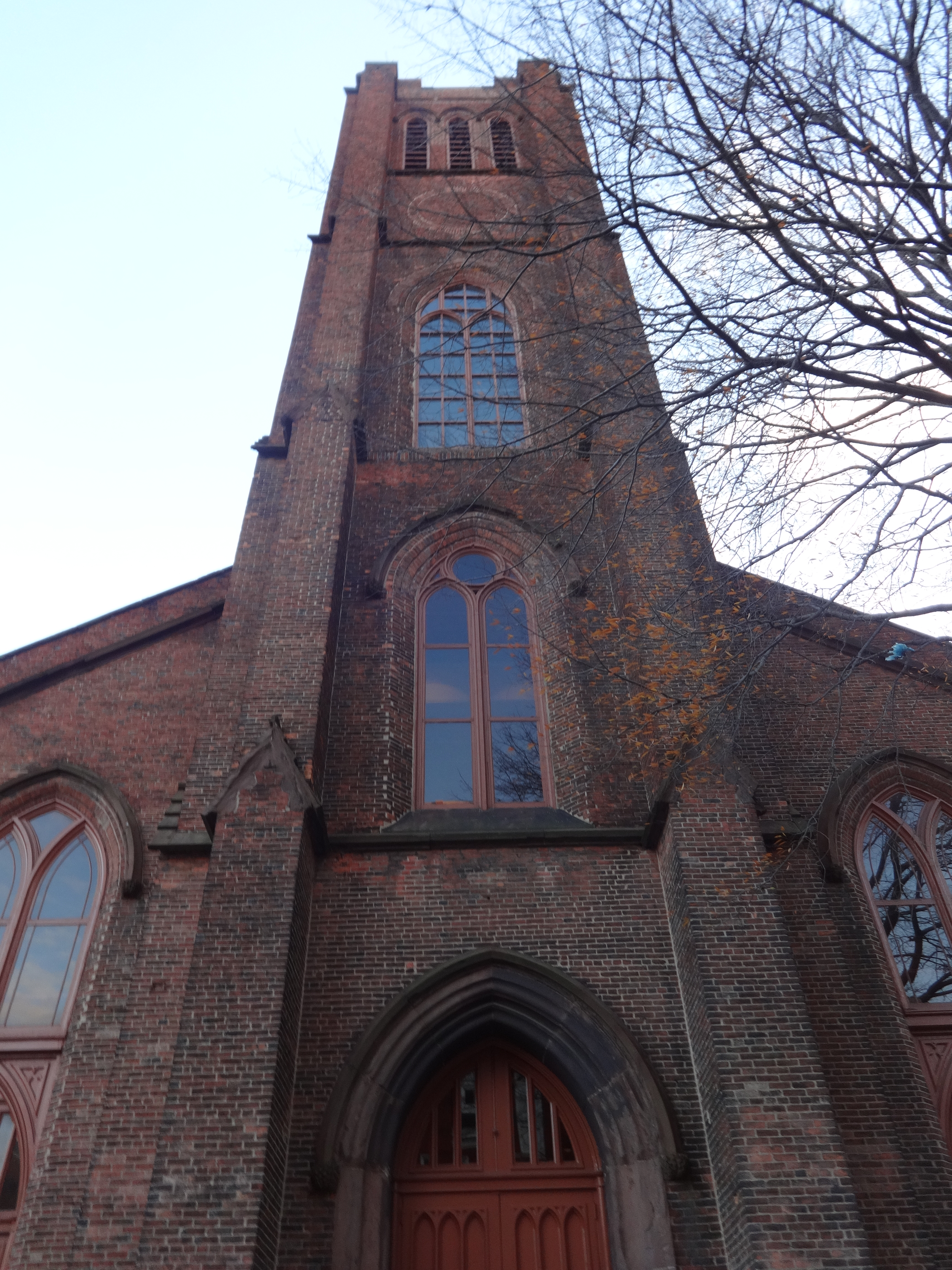
The tower as seen from Fayette Street in 2017

The graveyard was established in January 1787 by the First Presbyterian Church of Baltimore, from land on the west side of old Baltimore Town purchased by a committee of laymen consisting of William Smith, John Boyd, and William Patterson, a locally prominent merchant and owner of the future Patterson Park, father of Elizabeth Patterson, (1785–1879), who in 1803 married Jerome Bonaparte, a brother of Napoleon Bonaparte. The land was sold by Colonel John Eager Howard (1752–1827), a former commander of the Maryland Line regiment of the Continental Army in the American Revolution. Howard owned the estate and mansion of Belvidere, in what was called "Howard's Woods", north of Baltimore Town, later to become the neighborhood of Mount Vernon-Belvedere, and the site of the landmark Washington Monument.

First Presbyterian was a congregation of Presbyterians and Reformed Protestants, and since it was established in 1761 it had been located in downtown Baltimore at the northwest corner of East Fayette Street at North Street (later Guilford Avenue). From 1790 to 1795, it occupied a landmark twin-spired Georgian-Federal building. Over the next 60 years, the "Burying Grounds" (or cemetery) became the final resting place for many important and influential merchants, politicians, statesmen, and dozens of Baltimore veterans of the American Revolutionary War and the War of 1812.

In July 1852, Westminster Presbyterian Church was erected at the graveyard, with its brick piers straddling gravestones and burial vaults to create what later Baltimoreans referred to as the "catacombs." For years, it was thought that the Gothic Revival-style church was built in response to a new city ordinance prohibiting cemeteries that were not adjacent to a religious structure. But research in the early 1980s by historian Michael Franch found no such ordinance—and revealed a more complex motive: The congregation hoped that the new expansion church would serve Baltimore's growing "West End"—new churches were then springing up in every corner of the city in response to a dramatic increase in population—and provide protection to an aging, old-fashioned, 18th century-style "burying ground" that few saw as an appropriate resting place for the more up-to-date 19th Century.

Westminster Presbyterian Church lived up to its promise and ministry for several decades, but had suffered a dramatic loss of worshippers by the early 20th century, as many people were moving to the outer city and its suburbs, joining other congregations there. Even First Presbyterian and the Franklin Street congregations eventually merged in 1974, (now known as "First and Franklin Street Presbyterian Church") moving to the First Church building at the corner of Park Avenue and West Madison Streets, with the old Franklin Street building now being used by a fundamentalist Protestant congregation that however takes good care of its historic building. Revived in the 1920s by a number of new active members, the congregation continued until 1977, when the small remaining Westminster Presbyterian congregation was disorganized, and its historical assets reverted to the Presbytery of Baltimore. The care of the church building and burial ground was taken over by the University of Maryland's School of Law, which occupies the rest of the square block to the south, southeast and east (bounded by West Baltimore, North Paca, West Fayette and North Greene Streets). The School of Law's city block campus is also surrounded by those of other schools of the University of Maryland at Baltimore's westside and downtown campus, founded in 1807.

Under the auspices of the newly organized, non-profit "Westminster Preservation Trust", the "burying grounds" were cleaned up and the church was renovated for secular public use and is now known as "Westminster Hall".

The restoration included the pipe organ that had been installed in the church by Johnson & Son in 1882 as their Opus 577. This restoration was done by Andover Organ Company.

Support and a listing has also been obtained from the Maryland Historical Trust and other heritage and tourism organizations such as the newly established efforts of the Baltimore National Heritage Area, with the National Park Service, with cooperation from the Maryland Historical Society, the Baltimore City Historical Society, Baltimore Heritage, Preservation Maryland, and the Office of Promotion and the Arts in the Mayor's Office of the City of Baltimore plus the Baltimore City Commission for Historical and Architectural Preservation. In 2006, the Westminster Preservation Trust installed more than 20 interpretive signs around the burying ground and catacombs to provide historical and biographical information on the area.

The site was used as a filming location for an episode of Creepy Canada, with paranormal investigators from BSPR discussing its possible haunting.

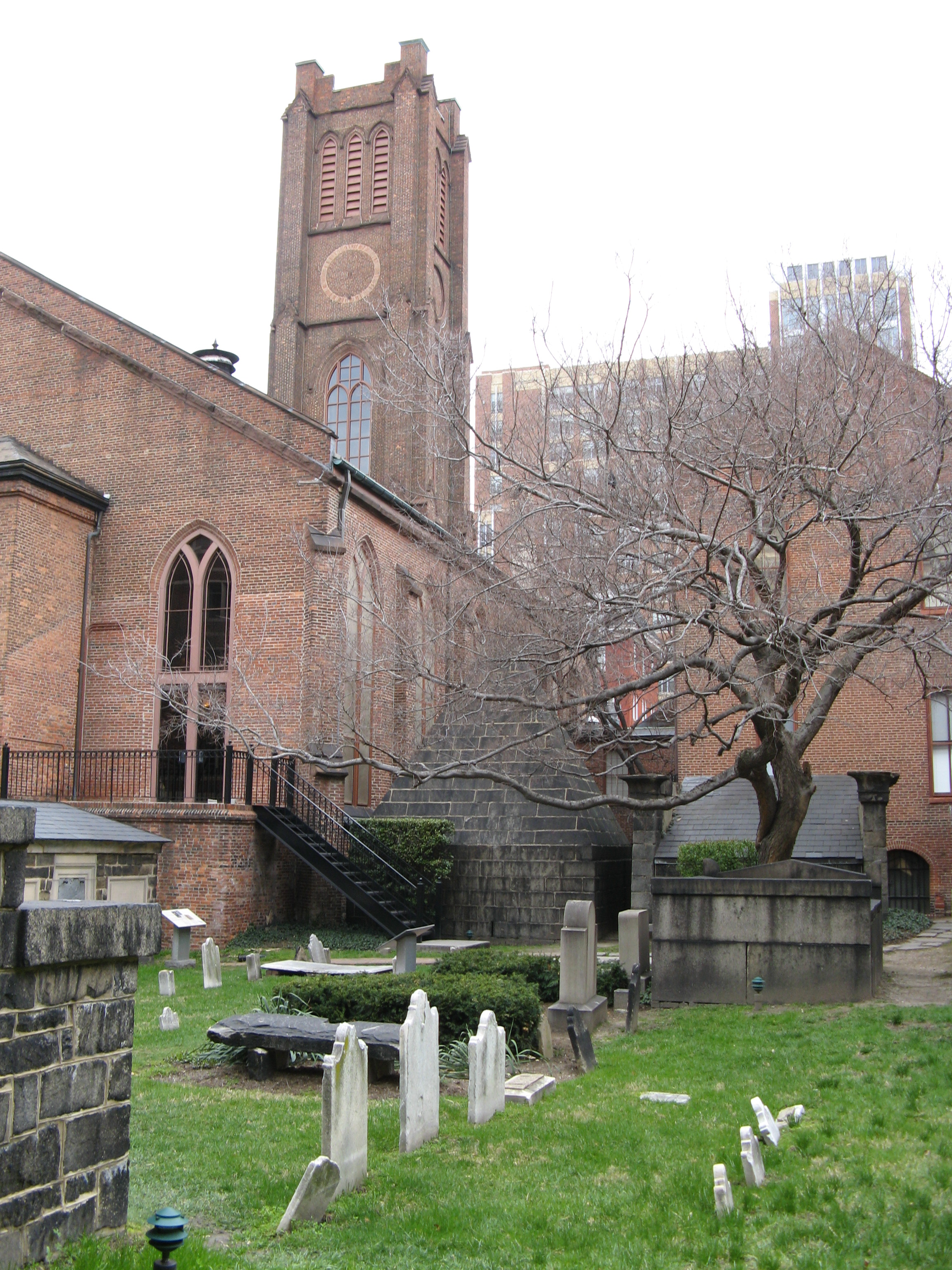
A view in 2008

== Historic designation ==
Westminster Hall and Burying Ground was listed on the National Register of Historic Places on September 17, 1974. They are included in the Baltimore National Heritage Area.

== Persons of note interred ==
A number of famous Marylanders are interred here, including many Revolutionary patriots and veterans of the War of 1812. Other Marylanders include:

- James Calhoun (1743–1816), last Mayor of Baltimore Town and first Mayor of the City of Baltimore
- James Morrison Harris (1817–1898), U.S. Representative
- Edward Johnson (1767–1829), Mayor of Baltimore during Battle of Baltimore in September 1814, chair of the "Committee of Vigilance and Safety".
- Philip Barton Key (1818–1859), son of Francis Scott Key, Shot and killed by Daniel E. Sickles, his lover's husband, at Lafayette Park, Washington, D.C., 27 February 1859
- James McHenry (1753–1816), signer of the U.S. Constitution and Secretary of War, namesake for Fort McHenry.
- Edgar Allan Poe (1809–1849), short story writer, editor and critic
  - Virginia Eliza Clemm Poe (1822–1847), teen-age wife of Edgar Allan Poe
  - Maria Clemm (1790–1871), mother-in-law and aunt of Edgar Allan Poe
  - William Henry Leonard Poe (1807–1831), brother of Edgar Allan Poe
  - General David Poe, Sr. (1743–1816), grandfather of Edgar Allan Poe
- Robert Smith (1757–1842), Secretary of the Navy, Secretary Of State, and Attorney General
- Samuel Smith (1752–1839), U.S. Congressman, U.S. Senator, and Mayor of Baltimore, and Major General, commander of Maryland Militia in the War of 1812, with overall command during the British attack in September 1814 and the Battle of Baltimore, with the fortification/defensive forces on "Loudenschlager's Hill (now "Hampstead Hill" in Patterson Park), the Bombardment of Fort McHenry and the Battle of North Point.
- Samuel Sterett (1758–1833), U.S. Representative
- John Sterett (1751–1787), Capt. Revolutionary War & Member of Maryland Legislature
- Joseph Sterett (1773–1821), General during the War of 1812
- David Harris (1753–1809), Capt. Revolutionary War & Son of John Harris, the founder of Harrisburg PA
- David Stewart (1800–1858), U.S. Senator
- John Stricker (1758–1825), War of 1812 Maryland Militia Brigadier General and commander at the Battle of North Point.

=== Edgar Allan Poe ===
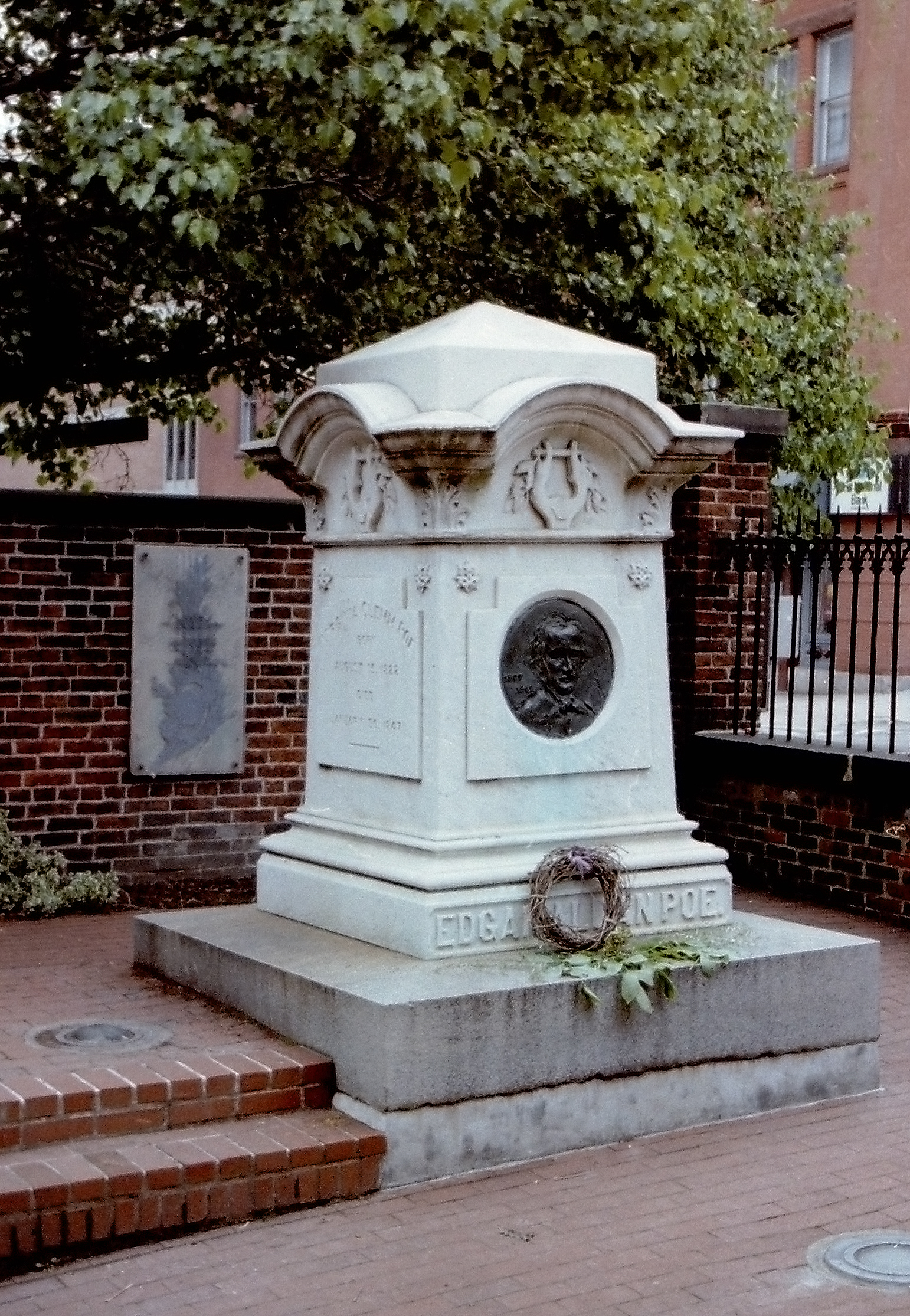
Edgar Allan Poe's grave

The poet and author Edgar Allan Poe was buried here in October 1849, following his sudden and mysterious death after being found in a sick and semi-conscious state wearing unfamiliar clothes. Poe was taken to the Church Home and Infirmary on Broadway (between East Fayette and Baltimore Streets on "Washington Hill"), where he died four days later. He was interred here in the old Western Burying Grounds, then in the use of the First Presbyterian Church. Some time later, a small stone was erected at the plot in the southeastern corner of the cemetery, through the efforts of his relative Neilson Poe. By a year later, a substantial church was planned to be erected over the grounds, to be built upon supporting brick and stone arches, to preserve the resting places of those interred below. The new Westminster Presbyterian Church, sponsored by the First Presbyterean Church and the newer Franklin Street Presbyterian Church, along with the Presbytery of Baltimore, had been built and dedicated by July 1852.

Poe has two memorials in the Burying Ground. His first burial spot, near the back of today's Westminster Hall, is still marked by a headstone with an engraved raven. It stands in the family plot, no. 27, where his grandfather General David Poe, Sr. and his brother Henry Leonard Poe were also buried. A few years later, thanks to Poe's growing literary fame since his death, a resolution was offered by John Basil, Jr., principal of the Number 8 Grammar School, and was adopted appointing a committee of five: Basil himself, Thomas D. Baird, and J.J.G. Webster of the Central High School of Baltimore, later renamed in 1866 as the Baltimore City College, along with Misses Veeder and Wise – "to devise some means best adapted in their judgment to perpetuate the memory of one who has contributed so largely to American literature". A subscription was taken up in October 1865 by several leaders and members of the Public School Teachers Association called "Pennies for Poe", to raise money for a better memorial. Numerous activities to raise funds were held by the pupils and the teachers of the Baltimore City Public Schools, including various entertainments by the young ladies of the Western and Eastern High Schools, under the direction of Miss S. A. Rice. By March 1871, the "Poe Memorial Fund" amounted to about $587.00. Then a new committee of Profs. Elliott (City College), Kerr and Hamilton and Misses Rice and Baer, professors of English and Literature at the Western-Eastern High Schools, was appointed. By April 1872, they had resolved to apply the money collected to erecting a monument over Poe's grave. By September 1874, with the estate of the late Principal Thomas Baird of the City College being donated, consisting of $627.55, the architect of the new Baltimore City Hall on Holliday Street, George A. Frederick, was requested to design a suitable stone monument, which later ran over the expected cost, however the balance was made up by a generous donation from a Philadelphian, Mr. George W. Childs, of $650.00. The monument was then carved by the stonemason Hugh Sisson, the "Marble King of Baltimore". Poe's body was exhumed and moved to the new more prominent northwestern site near the cemetery entrance gate at the corner of North Greene and West Fayette Streets. The monument was dedicated on November 17, 1875 in the presence of a large crowd of spectators, with addresses by Professors William Elliott, Jr., H. E. Shepherd, and the author-artist and orator John H. B. Latrobe, and representatives of several other public schools, colleges and institutions.

The design of the monument consists of a pedestal (or die block) with an ornamental cap wholly of marble, resting on two marble slabs, and a granite base. The front of the die block bears a medallion portrait of Poe by the sculptor Volck, while on the western side appear the lines of inscription: "Edgar Allan Poe: born Jan. 20, 1809; died Oct. 7, 1849."

When Poe was re-buried, the remains of his aunt and mother-in-law Maria Clemm, were also moved. They were later joined by Poe's wife Virginia, who had died in the Bronx in 1847 and had been interred in a vault. In 1885 her remains were moved to the Poe Monument, where they were reburied in a bronze box to the left of it.

Annual observances on Poe's birth and death dates at his grave side are still conducted to this day, attended by the WHT officials, Presbyterian Church clergy, and members of several literary, educational and historical societies (such as the Poe Society of Baltimore), representatives of the several Baltimore City public high schools whose predecessors sponsored the Monuments over 140 years ago (Baltimore City College with their two old literary and debating societies: Bancroft and Carrollton-Wight, and the Western High School and the Eastern High School) and the general public and media. There is also additionally, very popular tours of the graves and catacombs below the old church and hall and activities on the festival of "Halloween" in late October.

Westminster Hall is the location of the Westminster Preservation Trust annual Poe birthday celebration every January, often featuring theatrical presentations and an apple cider toast. On Poe's birthday, January 19, an unidentified man known endearingly as the Poe Toaster visited the burying ground to make an annual tribute to Poe. The tradition seemingly ended in 2009.

== Gallery ==
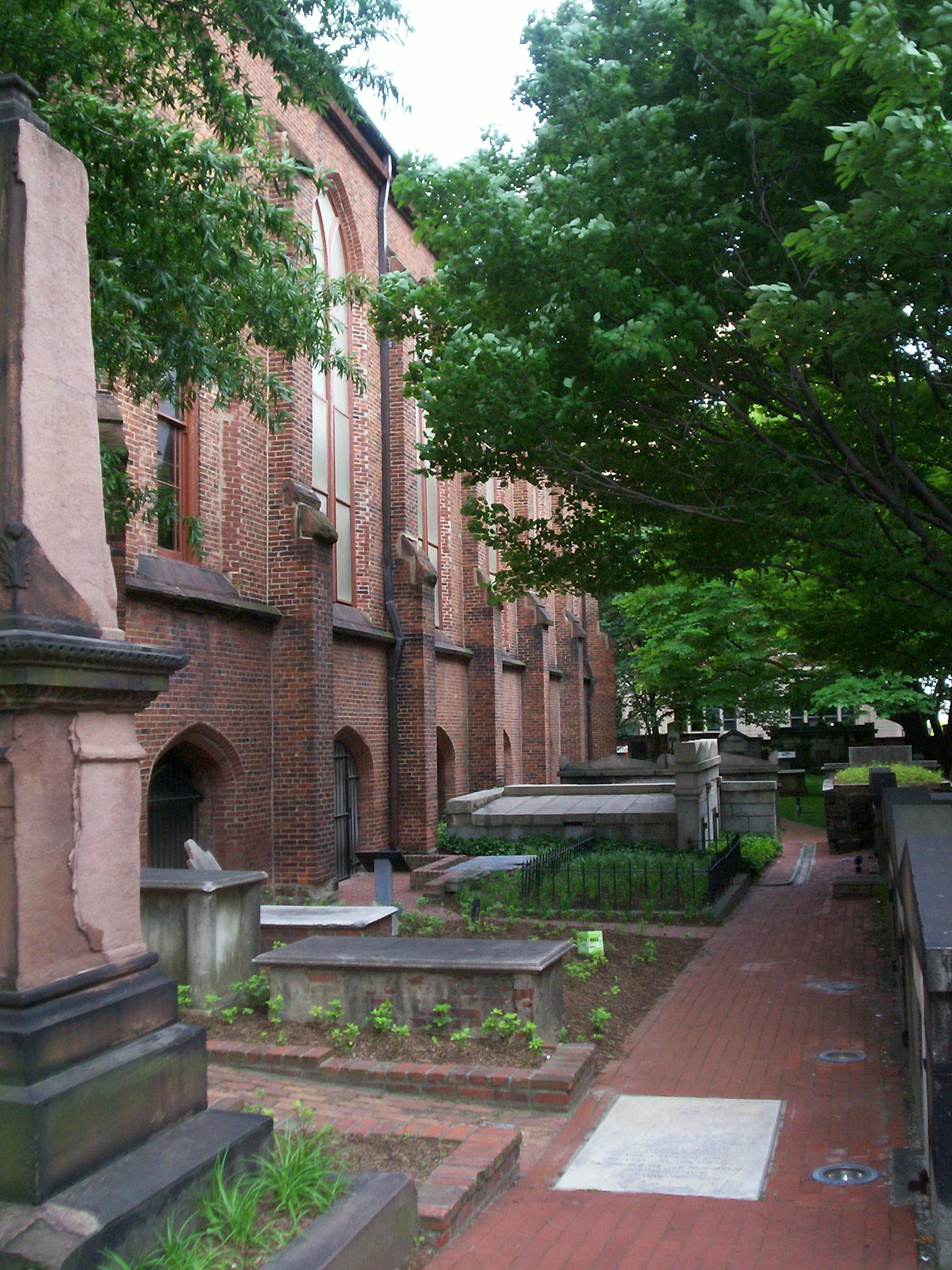
One side of Westminster Hall in 2008

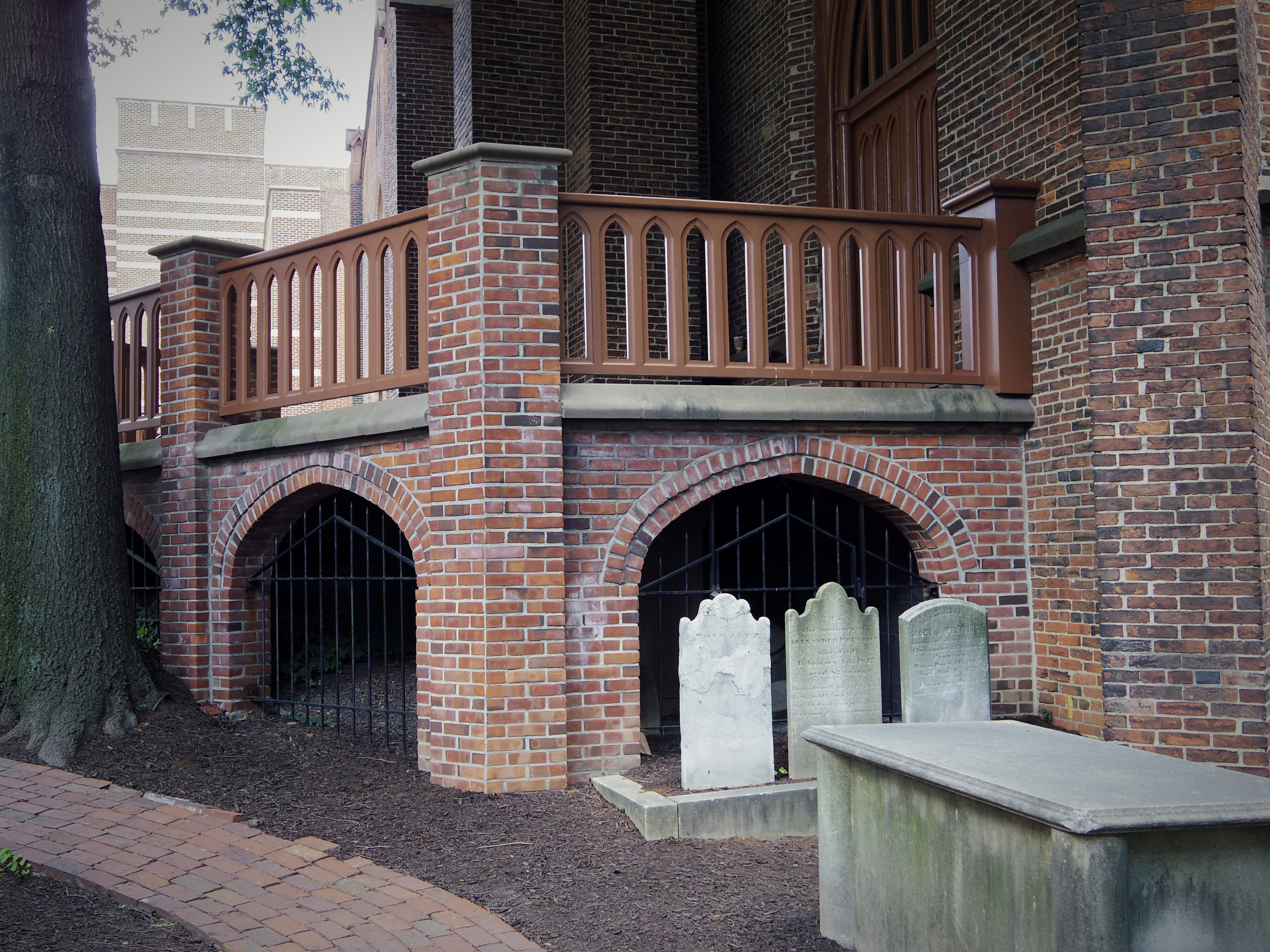
"The catacombs"

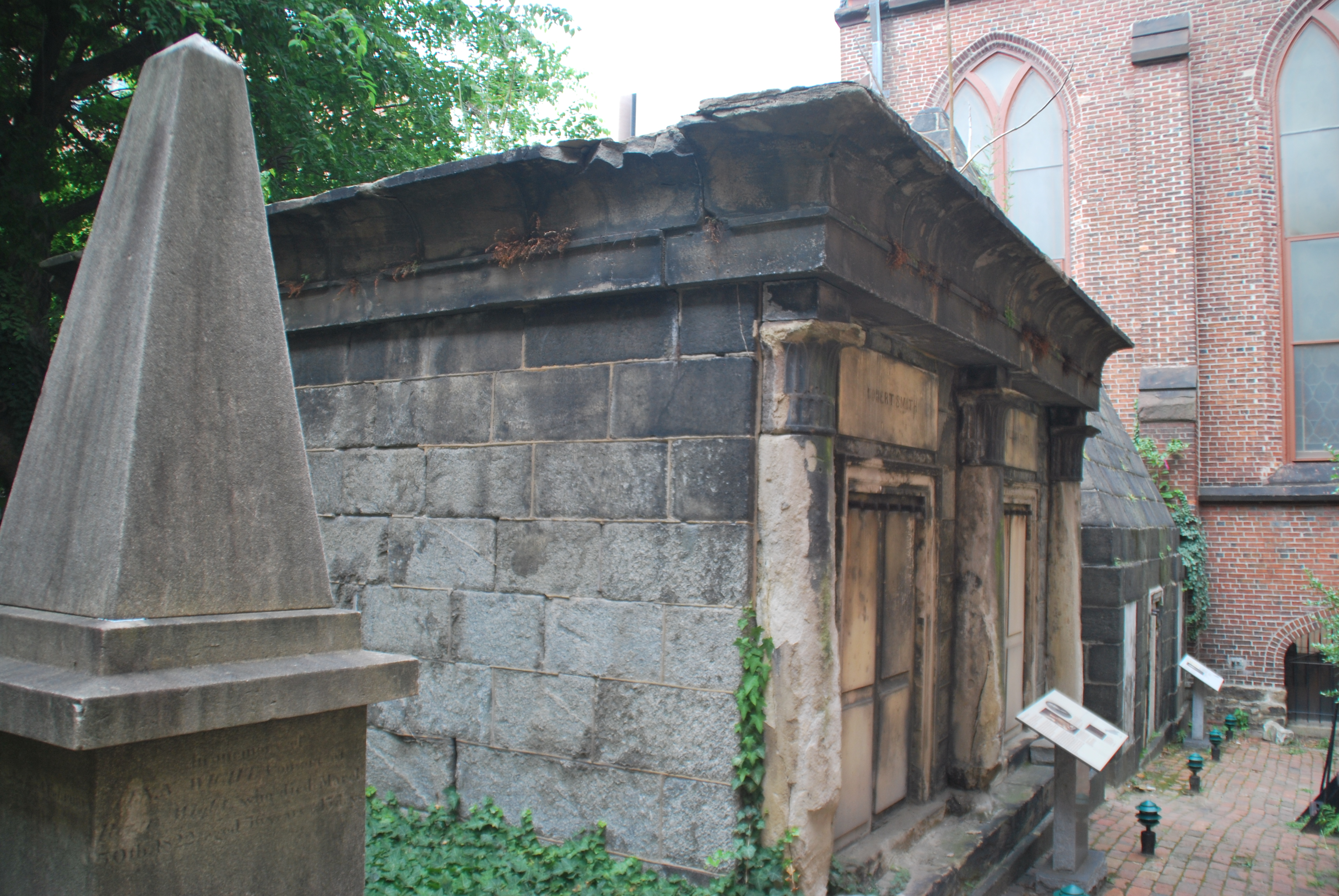
One of the mausoleums in 2012
