= Poe Toaster =

Unknown individual noted for visits to the grave of Edgar Allan Poe

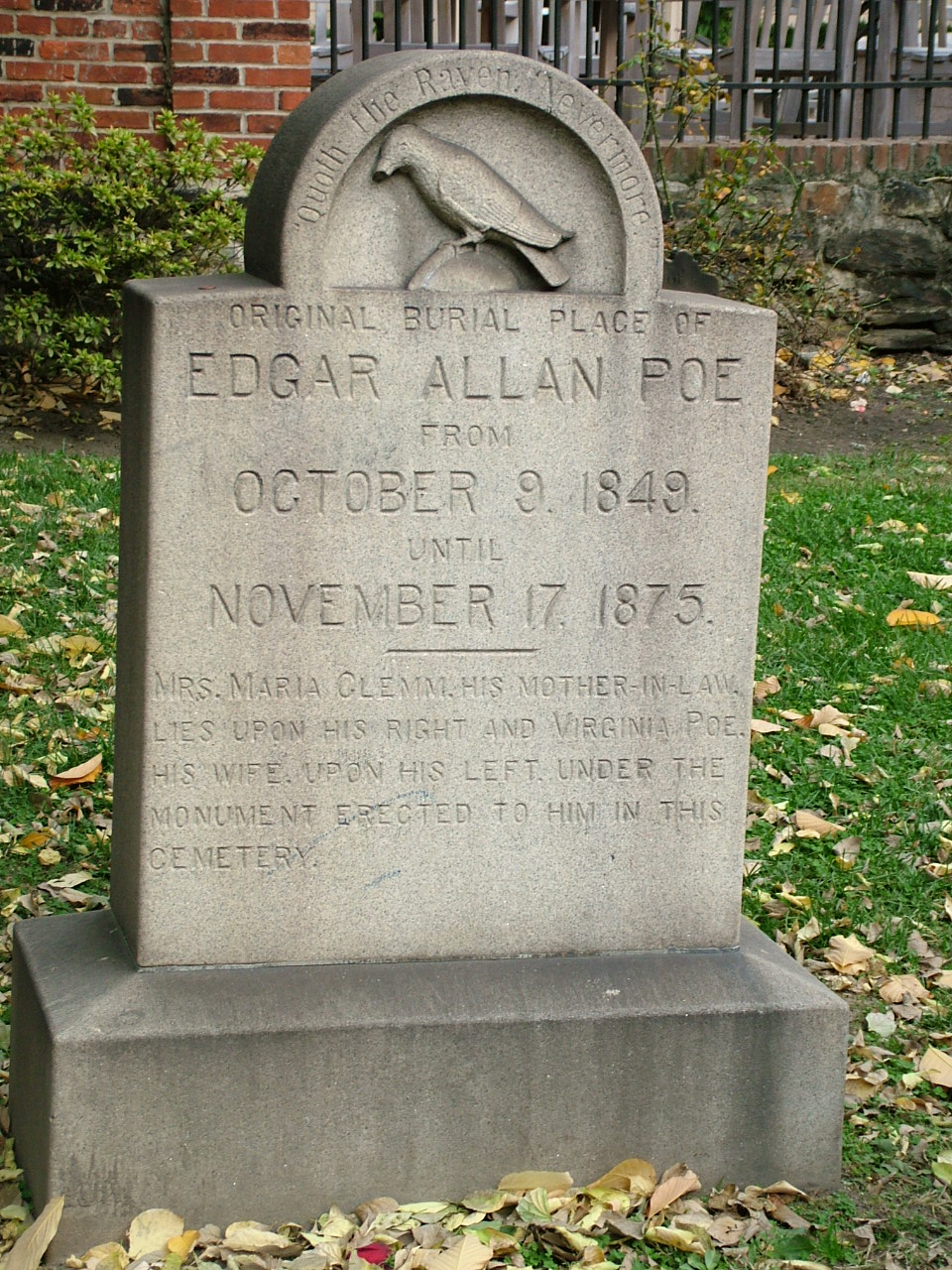
The Poe Toaster paid a stealthy visit to the cenotaph marking the site of Poe's original grave, in Baltimore, every January 19 for at least 60 years.

Poe Toaster is the media sobriquet used to refer to an unidentified person (or probably more than one person in succession) who, for several decades, paid an annual tribute to the American author Edgar Allan Poe by visiting the cenotaph marking his original grave in Baltimore, Maryland, in the early hours of January 19, Poe's birthday. The shadowy figure, dressed in black with a wide-brimmed hat and white scarf, would pour himself a glass of cognac (or cherry brandy, amontillado, or Scotch whisky) and raise a toast to Poe's memory, then vanish into the night, leaving three roses in a distinctive arrangement and the unfinished bottle of liquor. Onlookers gathered annually in hopes of glimpsing the elusive Toaster, who did not seek publicity and was rarely seen or photographed.

According to eyewitness reports and notes accompanying offerings in later years, the original Toaster made the annual visitation from sometime in the 1930s (though no report appeared in print until 1950) until his death in 1998, after which the tradition was passed to "a son". Controversial statements were made in some notes left by the post-1998 Toaster. In 2010, there was no visit by the Toaster, with absences in 2011 and 2012 signaling an end to the lengthy 75-year tradition. In 2016, the Maryland Historical Society selected a new "Toaster", marking the start of a new era for the tradition.

== History ==
=== Origins ===
Edgar Allan Poe, an American author, died in Baltimore, Maryland, on October 7, 1849, under mysterious circumstances. The Poe Toaster tradition may have begun as early as the 1930s, according to witnesses, and continued annually until 2009.

Each year, in the early hours of the morning of January 19 (Poe's birthday), a black-clad figure carrying a silver-tipped cane, his face obscured by a scarf or hood, entered the Westminster Hall and Burying Ground in Baltimore. At the site of Poe's original grave—which is marked with a commemorative stone—he would pour a glass of Martell cognac and raise a toast. He then arranged three red roses on the monument in a distinctive configuration and departed, leaving the unfinished bottle of cognac.

The roses were believed to represent Poe, his wife Virginia Eliza Poe, and his mother-in-law Maria Clemm, all three of whom were originally interred at the site. The significance of the cognac is uncertain, as it does not feature in Poe’s works (as would, for example, amontillado); but a note left at the 2004 visitation suggested that the cognac may have represented a tradition of the Toaster's family rather than Poe's. Several of the cognac bottles are kept at the Edgar Allan Poe House and Museum.

A group of varying size composed of reporters and Poe enthusiasts observed the event each year. A photograph, reputedly of the Toaster, was published by Life Magazine in 1990.

=== Notes ===
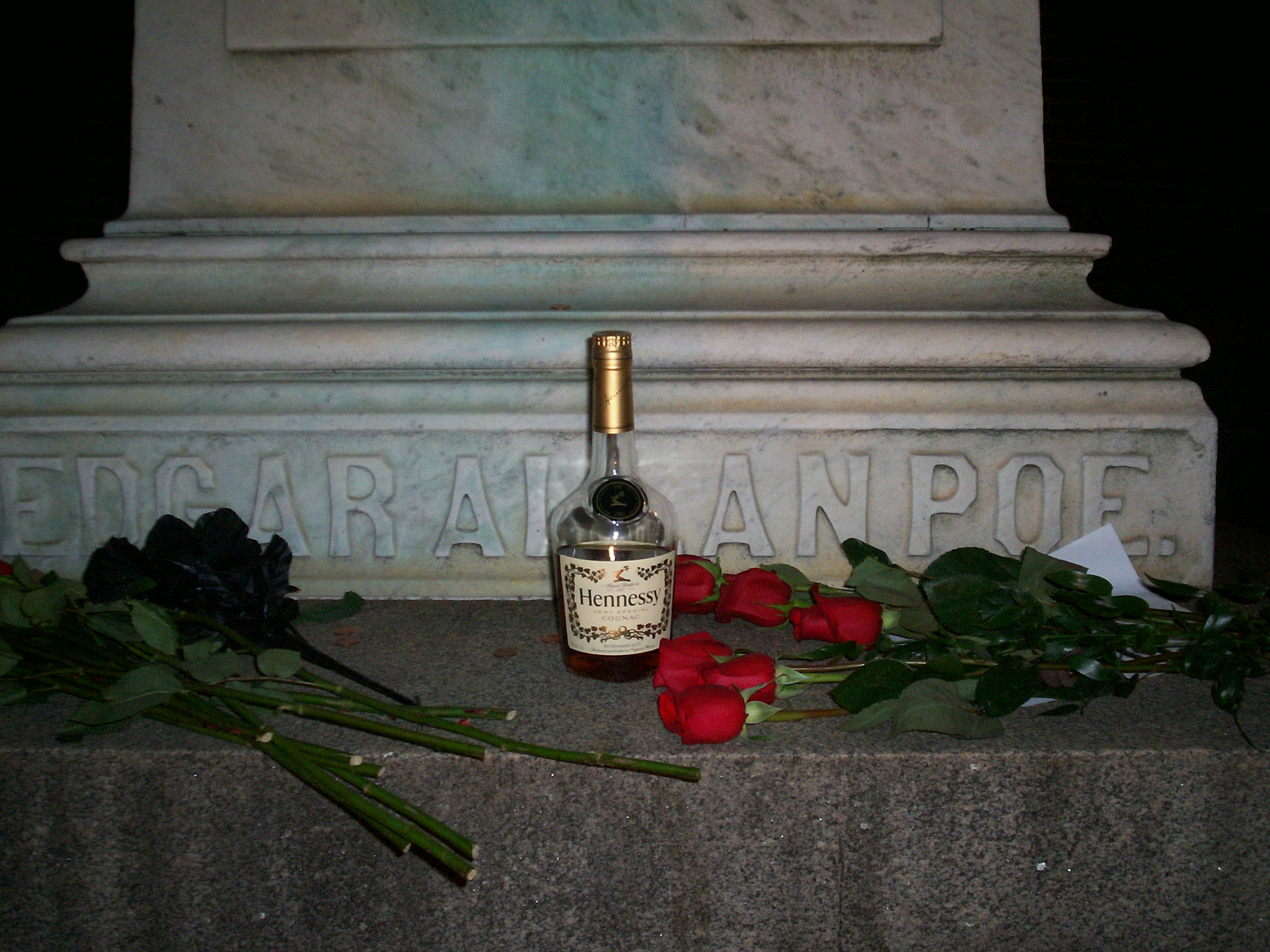
Cognac and roses found at Poe's present-day (post-1875) grave on January 19, 2008, likely left by an imitator, who has left Hennessy instead of Martell

On several occasions, the Toaster left a note along with the roses and cognac. Some notes were simple expressions of devotion, such as, "Edgar, I haven't forgotten you." In 1993, a cryptic message stated, "The torch will be passed." In 1999, a note announced that the original Toaster had died the previous year and had passed the tradition to "a son." Subsequent eyewitnesses noted that the post-1998 Toaster appeared to be a younger individual.

A note left at the 2001 visitation, which happened to occur a few days before Super Bowl XXXV between the Baltimore Ravens and the New York Giants, spurred controversy in Baltimore: "The New York Giants. Darkness and decay and the big blue hold dominion over all. The Baltimore Ravens. A thousand injuries they will suffer. Edgar Allan Poe evermore." Never before had the Toaster commented on sports or other current events, nor could anyone explain the negative reference to Baltimore's football team, whose nickname was inspired by Poe's poem "The Raven". The prophecy, a play on the last line of "The Masque of the Red Death" ("And Darkness and Decay and the Red Death held illimitable dominion over all") and on the Giants' nickname "The Big Blue," proved inaccurate, as Baltimore won the game 34–7.

The Toaster's 2004 note was apparently critical of French opposition to the Iraq War: "The sacred memory of Poe and his final resting place is no place for French cognac. With great reluctance but for [sic] respect for family tradition the cognac is placed. The memory of Poe shall live evermore!"

Jeff Jerome, former curator of the Poe House and Museum, has suggested that the 2001 and 2004 notes may have reflected an unwillingness of the son (or sons) to take the tradition as seriously as had the father. A final note—left sometime between 2005 and 2008—was so dismaying, Jerome said, that he decided to fib and announce that no note had been left. He declined to reveal its contents, other than that it was a hint, in hindsight, that an end to the tradition was imminent.

=== Events leading up to Poe's bicentennial ===
In 2006, a group of onlookers unsuccessfully attempted to ascertain how the Poe Toaster got into the Burial Ground each year. Aside from that incident, spectators never interfered with the Toaster's entry, tribute ritual or departure, nor was any concerted effort made to identify the individual.

In 2007, a 92-year-old man named Sam Porpora claimed that he had started the Poe Toaster tradition. A former historian for Baltimore's Westminster Church, Porpora claimed that he invented the Toaster in the 1960s as a "publicity stunt" to reinvigorate the church and its congregation, and then falsely told a reporter that the visitations had begun in 1949. However, published reports of the annual visits by the Toaster date from well before the 1960s; for example, a 1950 article in the Baltimore Evening Sun mentions "an anonymous citizen who creeps in annually to place an empty bottle (of excellent label) against the gravestone."

Porpora's daughter said she had never heard of her father's actions, but that the story was consistent with his "mischievous nature." Nevertheless, Jeff Jerome pointed out that the details of Porpora's story seemed to change with each telling. "There are holes so big in Sam's story, you could drive a Mack truck through them," he said. Jeff Savoye of the Edgar Allan Poe Society also questioned Porpora's claims, but admitted he could not definitively disprove them. While never retracting his story, Porpora later acknowledged that it was not he making the annual visits, and that someone else whose identity he didn't know had made the tradition his own.

In 2008, Jerome reported that nearly 150 gathered to observe the Toaster's appearance. In 2009, the 200th anniversary of Poe's birth, the crowd was smaller than in previous years—despite the bicentennial milestone—and the Toaster left no note.

=== End of original tradition ===
In 2010, the Poe Toaster failed to appear. Jerome, who had witnessed every visitation from 1976 on, had no explanation, but did speculate that if the Toaster intended to end the tradition, the 2009 bicentennial of Poe's birth would mark a logical ending point.

The 2011 anniversary saw only the appearance of four impostors—immediately dubbed "faux Toasters"—identified as such because all four walked in clear sight of waiting observers (contrary to the real Toaster's secretive nature); none gave the secret signal that only Jerome knew, a gesture the Toaster predictably made each year at the grave; and none arranged the roses in the unique pattern established by the Toaster. The faux Toasters' appearance sparked controversy: While some preferred that the tradition die a "dignified death", others urged that it be carried on, by imitators if necessary.

In 2012, once again, there was no appearance by anyone identifiable as the "original" Toaster. Jerome (who has denied rumors that he himself was the Toaster) proclaimed the tradition "over with". "I would have thought they would leave a note for me saying it was over," he said. "That does annoy me a little bit, but they are under no obligation to [do so]."

=== Revival ===
In 2015, the Maryland Historical Society organized a competition to select a new individual to resurrect the annual tribute in a modified, tourism-friendly form. The new Toaster—who will also remain anonymous—made his first appearance during the daylight hours of January 16, 2016 (a Saturday, three days before Poe's birthday), wearing the traditional garb and playing Saint-Saëns' Danse macabre on a violin. After raising the traditional cognac toast and placing the roses, he intoned, "Cineri gloria sera venit" ("Glory paid to one's ashes comes too late", from an epigram by the Roman poet Martial) and departed.

Although the COVID-19 pandemic restricted the crowd from seeing the Toaster in 2021 and 2022, 2023 saw the restrictions being lifted, allowing crowds to gather to see the Toaster's tribute.

== In popular culture ==
The Poe Toaster has appeared as a character in books, occult documentaries and other media. The 2001 novel, In a Strange City, by Baltimore crime fiction novelist Laura Lippman features two Poe Toasters. The Poe Toaster is the subject of numerous non-fiction occult treatises. More recently, the 2011 audio play The Poe Toaster Not Cometh by Washington Audio Theater seeks to explain the Poe Toaster mystery by suggesting the Poe Toaster is in fact a contemporary of Poe, surviving through the centuries via occult means.

The mystery of the Poe Toaster was featured in an episode of Creepy Canada along with the circumstances that led up to Poe's death and rumors of his ghost haunting Westminster Hall and Burying Ground.

Some publications note the similarity of the name Poe Toaster with a word coined by Ben Jonson in the 17th century, poetaster, meaning an inferior poet, presumably not referring to Poe himself, but to the Poe Toaster.

== See also ==
- Rudolph Valentino's "Woman in Black"
