= French Fort Cove =

Nature park in New Brunswick, Canada

Coordinates: 47°1′16.1″N 65°32′27.9″W

French Fort Cove, Miramichi, New Brunswick

The French Fort Cove is a nature park located in Miramichi, New Brunswick, between Newcastle and Nordin-Miramichi, which contains regular and advanced walking trails, canoeing, kayaking, paddle-boats, a children's playground, ice-cream shop and holds many events and activities during the summer. It is the location of a former rock quarry which was used to build many buildings and the Langevin Block of Parliament Hill, among others.

== Pond hockey ==
The Miramichi Rotary Pond Hockey Tournament is an annual event that began in 2005 to celebrate the 100th anniversary of Rotary International. Profit from the tournament goes back into the community and helps to found projects that are supported by the Rotary Club of Newcastle. The tournament consists of teams of four competing in a number of different divisions including open competitive, over 35, women's, and family.

== Eco-Centre ==
Located on Cove Road, the Eco-Center contains a 6-surface curling rink and is open year-round to provide information about Miramichi's history and culture to tourists and to current residents looking to learn more about their city. There are also plans to develop educational programs that will allow school children will be able to collect species in the nearby cove, and bring them back to study them under microscopes, for use in science projects.

== Headless Nun Tour ==
The Headless Nun Tour is a one-hour guided tour of the French Fort Cove. It takes place after dark and involves costumed tour guides reciting the tale of the supposed headless nun that haunts the cove. The tour was featured on the nationally televised show Creepy Canada.

== Biking trails ==
The Cove is home to many advanced mountain biking trails, which are located off of the advanced hiking trails. They are looked after by the Miramichi Mountain Bike Club.

== Zip-Line ==
Over the Cove Zip-Line is located just beside the playground at French Fort Cove. There are two lines, each over 1000' long, making it the longest Zip-line in the Maritimes.
