= Headless Nun =

New Brunswick ghost

The Headless Nun is a ghost story associated with French Fort Cove in Nordin, now the City of Miramichi, New Brunswick.

== Legend ==
According to the tale that dates back to the mid-18th century, the Headless Nun was an 18th-century resident of the area named Sister Marie Inconnue (Inconnue being the French for 'unknown') who was subsequently beheaded. Details of the story vary: in one version, a "mad trapper" cut off her head and ran into the woods with it. In another, two sailors cut off her head after she refused to divulge the location of a treasure. The story holds that Sister Marie's head was never found, resulting in her spirit forever roaming the area in search of it. Today, "Headless Nun" tours are among the tourist attraction offerings at French Fort Cove.

== See also ==
- List of ghosts
- Madam Koi Koi
- Headless Horseman
