= Almede Chattelle =

Almede Chattelle, alternately spelled as Almeda, was a drifter convicted for the murder of thirteen year old Jessie Keith in Listowel, Ontario during 1894. Canadian police officer and sailor John Wilson Murray later wrote about his investigation with the Listowel murder in his autobiography Memoirs of a Great Detective, where he described Chattelle as "hairy as a gorilla" and having a "broad build". In 2011 the bodies of Chattelle and Frank Roughmond, the second man to be hanged in Perth - Chattelle being the first, were unearthed at the Stratford jail while the building was undergoing some foundation work. Both men were re-interred in Avondale Cemetery in Stratford.

On October 19, 1894, Jessie Keith was murdered and her mutilated body was discovered by a townsperson. Keith was found naked, with her throat slit and her abdomen slashed. The wounds were considered to be so horrific that comparisons were drawn to the then-recent murders by Jack the Ripper. A drifter by the name of Almede Chattelle was suspected of committing the crime and was apprehended five days after Keith's murder. He was found carrying a valise containing female undergarments, some of which he was alleged to have been wearing. Witnesses claimed that they had seen him on the railroad tracks close to the Keith home prior to the murder. A trial was held and Chattelle served as his own attorney. Future Supreme Court of Canada Justice John Idington served as the Crown prosecutor. Upon being arrested Chattelle had confessed to having murdered Keith, however once in court he rescinded his confession and pleaded innocence. Chattelle was found guilty of Keith's murder and was hung at the Perth County Jail on May 31, 1895, making him the first man to be hanged in Perth County.

In her book Improper Advances: Rape and Heterosexual Conflict in Ontario, 1880-1929, Queen's University professor Dr. Karen Dubinsky remarked that although evidence suggested that Chattelle was guilty, he did not receive adequate legal protection and the newspapers of the day proclaimed him guilty from the day he was arrested. She further stated that during the time period the case had received some criticism from lawyers and Quebec newspapers who heavily criticized the courts for the fact that "an obviously insane man had been allowed to conduct his own defense".

== In popular culture ==
- The murder was covered in the first episode of the third season of the Canadian television series Creepy Canada, entitled "Goatman/Banshee of Marrtown/Listowel Ripper". The episode alleged that there had been some sightings of the ghosts of Chattelle and Keith.
