= Perth County Courthouse =

Courthouse in Stratford, Ontario

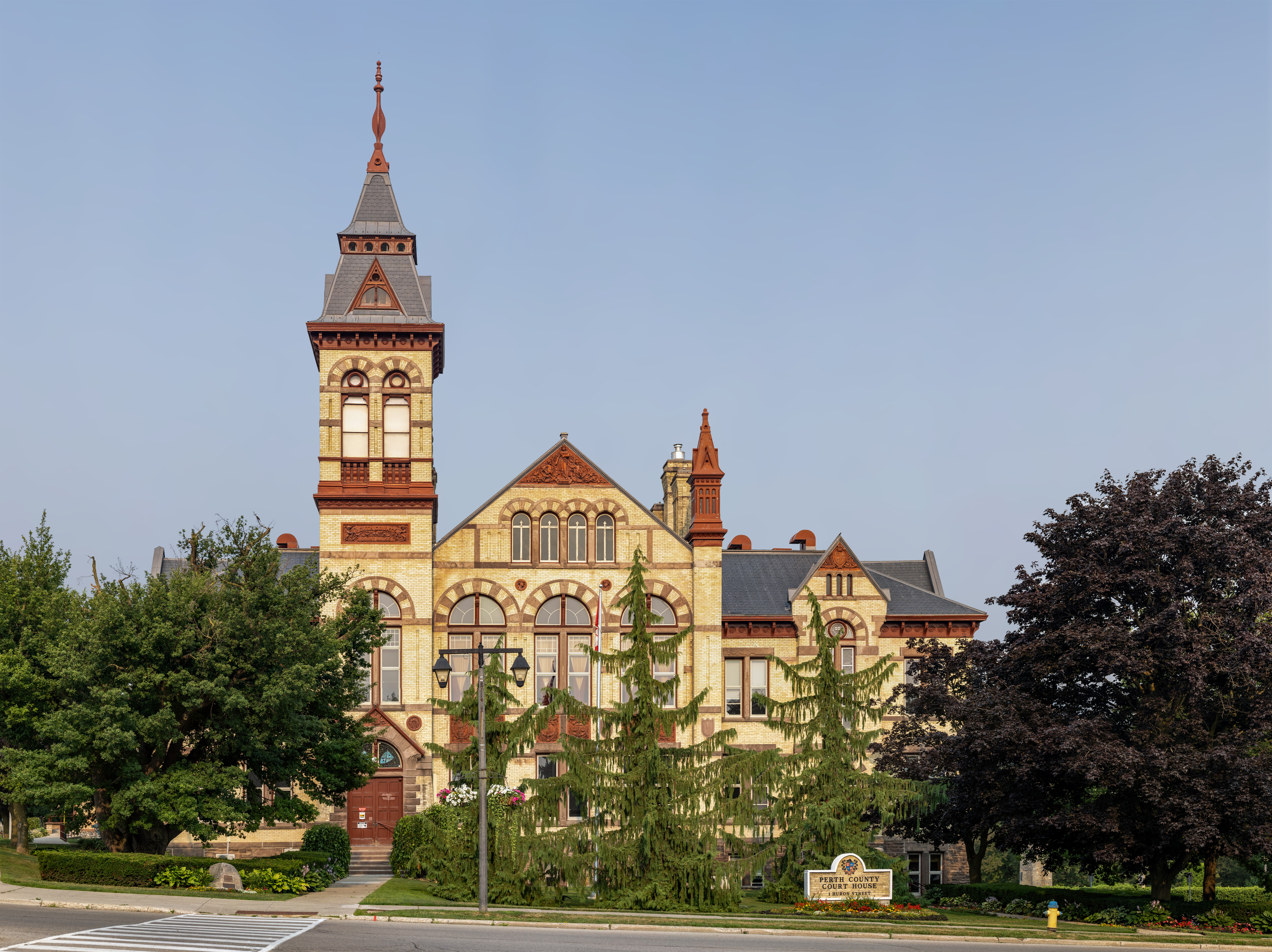
- Perth County Courthouse, 2025

General information
- Architectural style: Victorian architecture
- Location: 1 Huron Street, Stratford, Ontario, Canada
- Coordinates: 43.3715°N 80.9851°W
- Construction started: 1885
- Completed: 1887
- Owner: Perth County Council

Technical details
- Floor count: 3

Design and construction
- Architect: George F. Durand

The Perth County Courthouse is a courthouse and municipal building located in Stratford, Ontario, Canada, that serves Perth County. Constructed between 1885 and 1887, the courthouse was designed by George F. Durand and built by the Scrimgeour Brothers. This Victorian building borrows from Queen Anne and Richardsonian Romanesque architecture. The building is marked by bichromal masonry and a tower, as well as terracotta reliefs on the east and south facades.

Intended to replace a controversial earlier edifice, the Perth County Courthouse has remained in use since the first hearings were presided over by Judge James Peter Woods in 1887. Since its construction, the courthouse complex has hosted the Perth County Council, the Provincial Offences and Superior Courts, as well as the Stratford–Perth Archives. Much of the original architecture has been maintained, though extensive renovations have been undertaken to improve accessibility.

== Description ==
The Perth County Courthouse is located at 1 Huron Street in Stratford, Ontario, Canada. It is at the intersection of Huron and Ontario Streets, with the south facade facing St. Andrew Street. The north facade, visible from across the Avon River, overlooks the Shakespearean Gardens. The courthouse campus consists of several buildings, including the courthouse proper, 5 Huron Street, and the former Perth County Archives at 24 St. Andrew Street. It is situated atop a gradual slope.

The Perth County Courthouse is an example of Victorian architecture. It draws from the Queen Anne style, with a large tower as well as moulded brick chimneys and paned windows, and the Richardsonian Romanesque, with miniature columns as well as wall dormers that peak with gables. The outer walls consist of bichromal masonry, with yellow brick trimmed in Credit Valley red stone. The building also features stained glass windows; both these and the pane glass windows are of exaggerated height. Due to the slope, the building has a high rusticated stone foundation.

Terracotta reliefs adorn the east and south facades. One, atop the main gable, depicts Justice, flanked by cherubs bearing the scales and sword of justice. Also found on the eastern facade are representations of architecture, mechanics, agriculture, and art. Above the barristers entrance is the Perth County coat of arms. On the south facade, reliefs depict a pair of hands giving benediction; these are modelled after a keystone found at Merseburg Cathedral in Merseburg, Germany. Some reliefs are stamped H. Plasschaert, referring to Henry Plasschaert, an artist and later professor at the School of Industrial Art in Philadelphia, Pennsylvania.

At the time of its inauguration, the courthouse interior was finished in white pine with furnishings of oak. The doorways are hung under glazed transoms and designed to allow free circulation of air. Inside the main hall, paved in English encaustic tiles, a large staircase leads to the courtroom level. It is flanked by large wooden rails with carved newels in the Baroque style. Inside the main entrance is a cornerstone of Tennessee marble, engraved with the names of the architect, sculptor, and contractors. Several displays chronicling the history of the region are installed inside the courthouse.

At the time of the courthouse's completion, The Stratford Beacon Weekly lauded it as the "handsomest and best appointed court house in Canada". Writing in 1981, Adele Freeman of The Globe and Mail described it as "a lumbering structure bending under the weight of Victorian scruples". In their 1986 exploration of Victorian architecture in Southwestern Ontario, Nancy Z. Tausky and Lynne D. Distefano described the courthouse as having a "remarkably cheerful and comfortable atmosphere", which they attributed to the quality of the interior woodwork.

== History ==
=== Background and construction ===
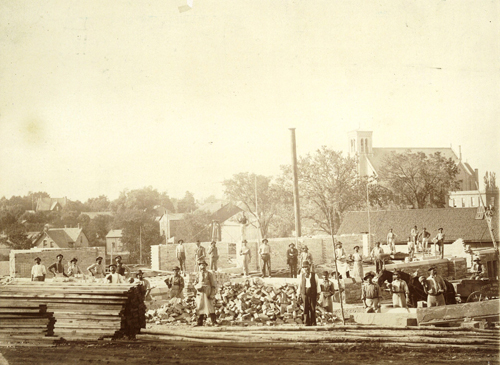
Work on the foundation, c. 1886

The first courthouse in Perth County, Ontario, was opened in 1853; it was built solely to fulfil the administrative requirements to gain formal status and levy taxes. Overlooking the Avon River and near St. James Church, the Peter Ferguson–designed courthouse was unpopular with county employees, who considered their offices "dark, miserable little dens ... arranged on each side of a narrow passage ... like rat holes", and little bigger than jail cells. In an 1869 report, the provincial inspector decried the jail, writing "the lower cells were fit only for dark punishment cells ... and the windows were mere portholes, unfit for either light or ventilation." In 1884, Chief Justice Adam Wilson refused to use the courthouse for hearings, instead heeding the advice of the sheriff and moving proceedings to the general council chamber of the Stratford City Hall; this, in turn, led Stratford to request that Perth County pay rent.

Initially reluctant to replace the courthouse, to the point of ignoring an 1871 order from the province to replace the jail, the Perth County Council relented in the 1880s. Writing to Provincial Architect Kivas Tully, they were urged to view other courthouses. The council agreed to view the courthouses of Dufferin County in Orangeville and Peel County in Brampton, with their tour concluding in January 1884. Despite concerns about the prominence of the Dufferin County Courthouse and the lighting in the Peel County Courthouse, they found inspiration in these designs. In March 1884 the county hired George F. Durand to design a new courthouse. Construction began in 1885, handled by Scrimgeour Brothers, under the supervision of J. R. Kilburn; county clerk William Davidson represented the county in monitoring progress. A new site, the former location of the first house in Stratford, was selected.

The jail, facing St. Andrew Street, was completed in 1886. By April 1887 the courthouse was nearing completion, with only the furnishings—also designed by Durand—remaining. The first storey included office space for local officials, including the sheriff, county clerk, and registrar. The second storey included the courtroom and space for grand and petit juries, as well as a law library. The basement provided fire-proof vaults for documents as well as several water boilers. The total cost of the building, excluding its artwork, was CA$65,700 (equivalent to $2,469,000 in 2025); another CA$10,000 (equivalent to $376,000 in 2025) was tendered to John Matheson for the stonework. Terracotta was completed by the Terra Cotta Company of Terra Cotta, Ontario.

Although the official opening was initially intended for the Golden Jubilee of Queen Victoria on June 22, 1887, the courthouse ultimately opened in May. (Note: Sources differ as to the date. Perth County (n.d.) gives May 9, while Tausky & Distefano (2018, p. 316) give May 13.) Judge James Peter Woods, who had been appointed county judge earlier that year, presided over the first hearings in the new courthouse in late 1887. He described the building as "a beautiful temple of justice erected in place of the old courthouse where people were in danger of their lives".

=== Subsequent history ===
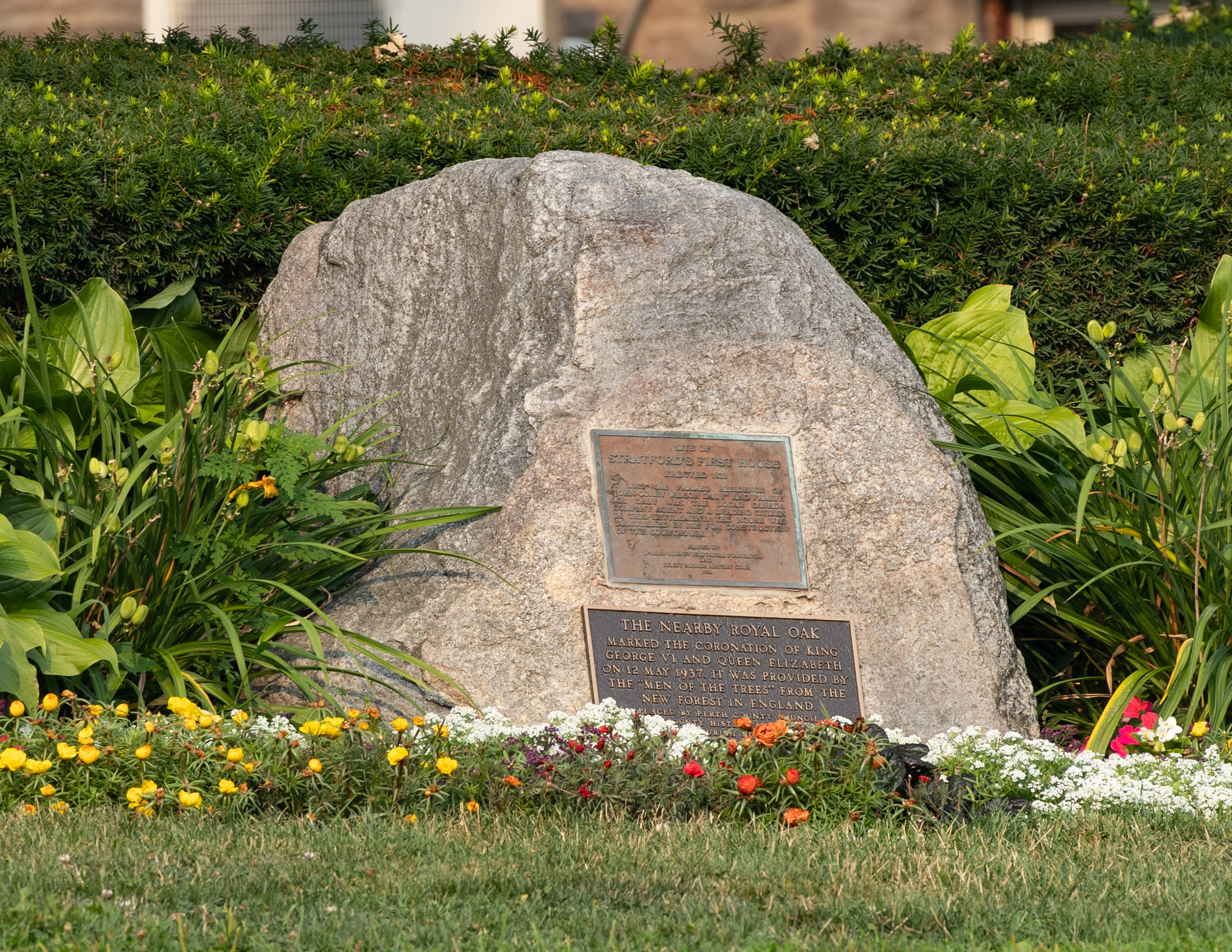
Stone commemorating the house of J. C. W. Daly, installed 1983

The first execution at the Perth County Jail occurred in 1895, when Almede Chattelle was hanged after killing a 13-year-old girl in Listowel. In 1908, Frank Roughmand was executed by hanging after being convicted of the rape and murder of a 66-year-old woman at her farmhouse. The last execution—Reuben Norman, sentenced to death for the murder of his girlfriend—took place in 1954. These were the only three executions to take place at the Perth County Jail. Bodies, presumed to belong to Chattelle and Roughmand, were excavated in 2010 during foundation work and reinterred.

James Anderson, the first Perth County archivist, initiated guided tours of the courthouse during his tenure. The Stratford–Perth Archives opened in the courthouse basement in 1972, moving to 24 St. Andrew Street by 1984. In 1981, to protest the dissolution of Heritage Stratford, Anderson spent a night on the courthouse roof, before launching a 36-day hunger strike. This dispute, which received national coverage, resulted in his dismissal, though Anderson was later re-hired.

A marker commemorating the house of J. C. W. Daly was installed at the courthouse in 1983. In 1995, when the City of Stratford was in the process of designating its downtown core a heritage conservation district, the courthouse became a subject of contention. Stratford, geographically located within Perth County, had become its own administrative body in 1885; consequently, the Perth County Council were unwilling to surrender "decision-making authority and control of a $9-million asset to an outside authority".

In 2020, the Perth County Council left the courthouse after several years considering alternative, more accessible sites; the Stratford–Perth Archives had already moved in 2015. Among cited concerns were overcrowding, with the 340 square metres (3,700 sq ft) of office space shared with Provincial Offences and Superior Court, as well as asbestos and security. The Perth County Council returned to the courthouse in 2025, voting on June 19 to renovate their chambers.

As of 2022, most of the courthouse's original features have remained intact, and the Perth County Council has received local recognition for its stewardship. However, several renovations have been undertaken. In 2009, the spire was replaced, followed by the slate roof in 2014. In 2022–2023, a new three-storey elevator was installed. The site underwent extensive renovations in 2023–2024 to connect the courthouse with an adjutant building at 5 Huron Street. Initially budgeted at CA$2.1 million, in 2023, the Stratford City Council accepted a bid of CA$4.8 million; by April 2024, some CA$5 million had been spent. This project also involved the installation of additional electrical outlets and charging stations for electric vehicles, as well as a new machine room and elevator.

== Gallery of reliefs ==
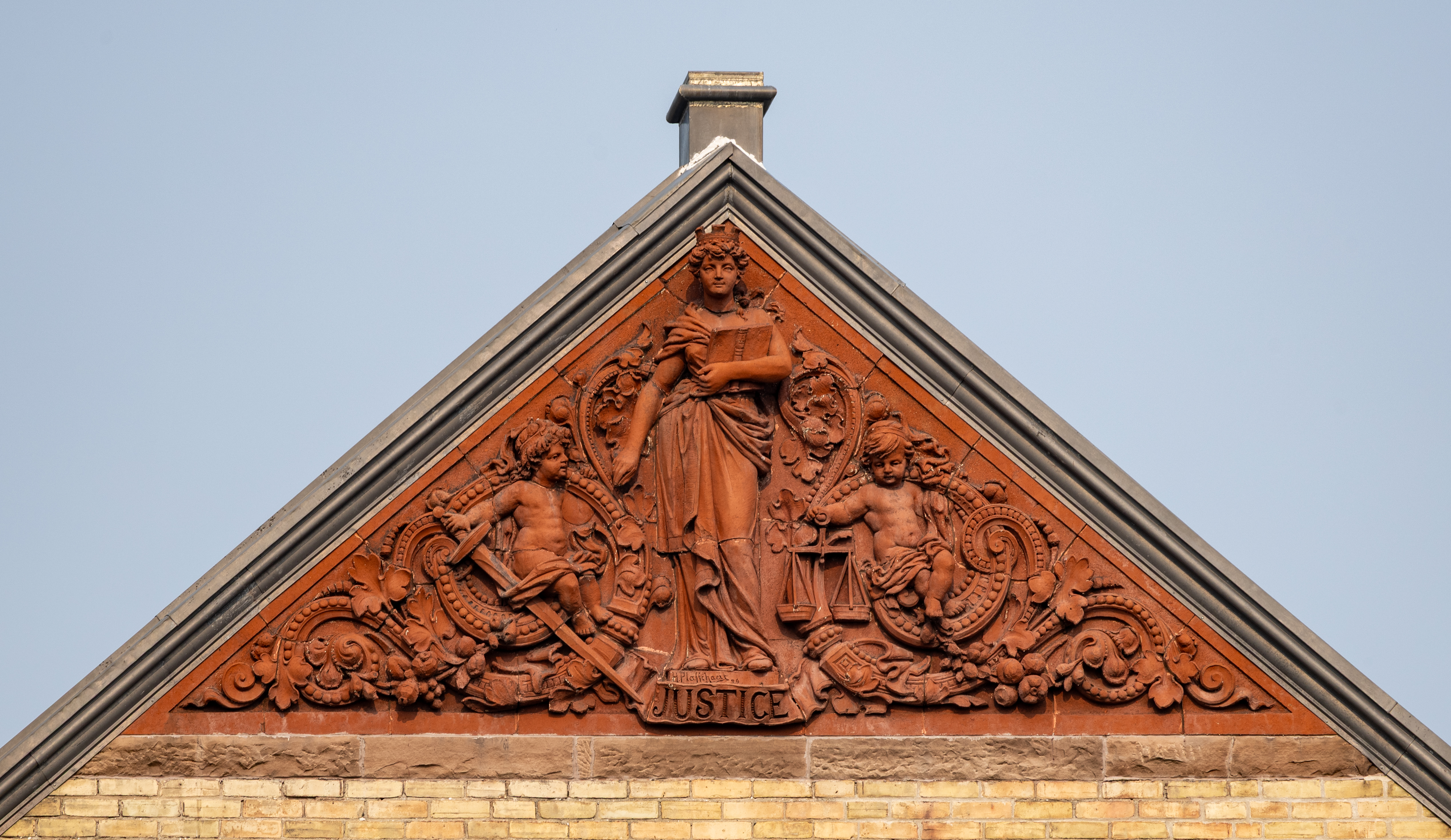
Justice flanked by cherubs

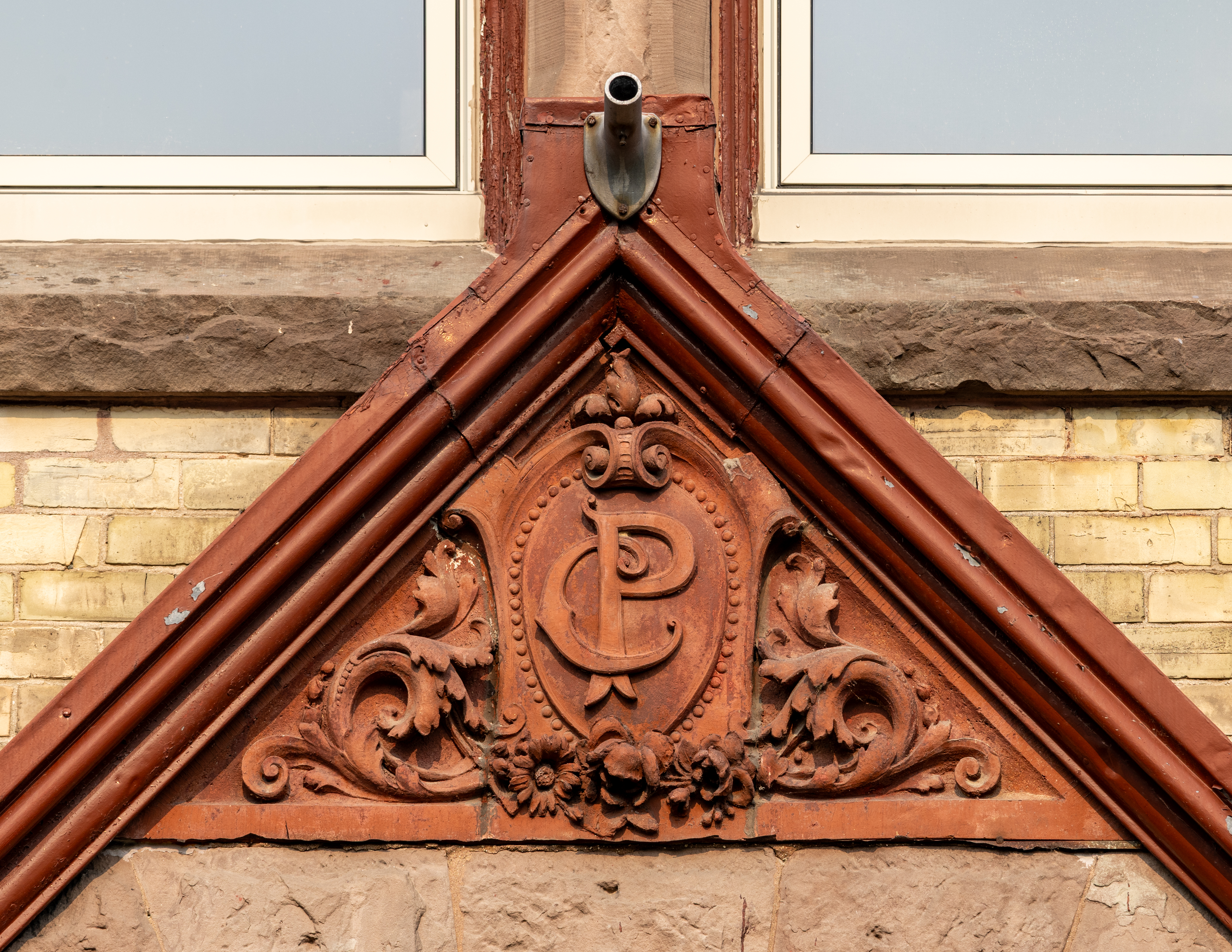
Emblem emblazoned with the initials "PC"

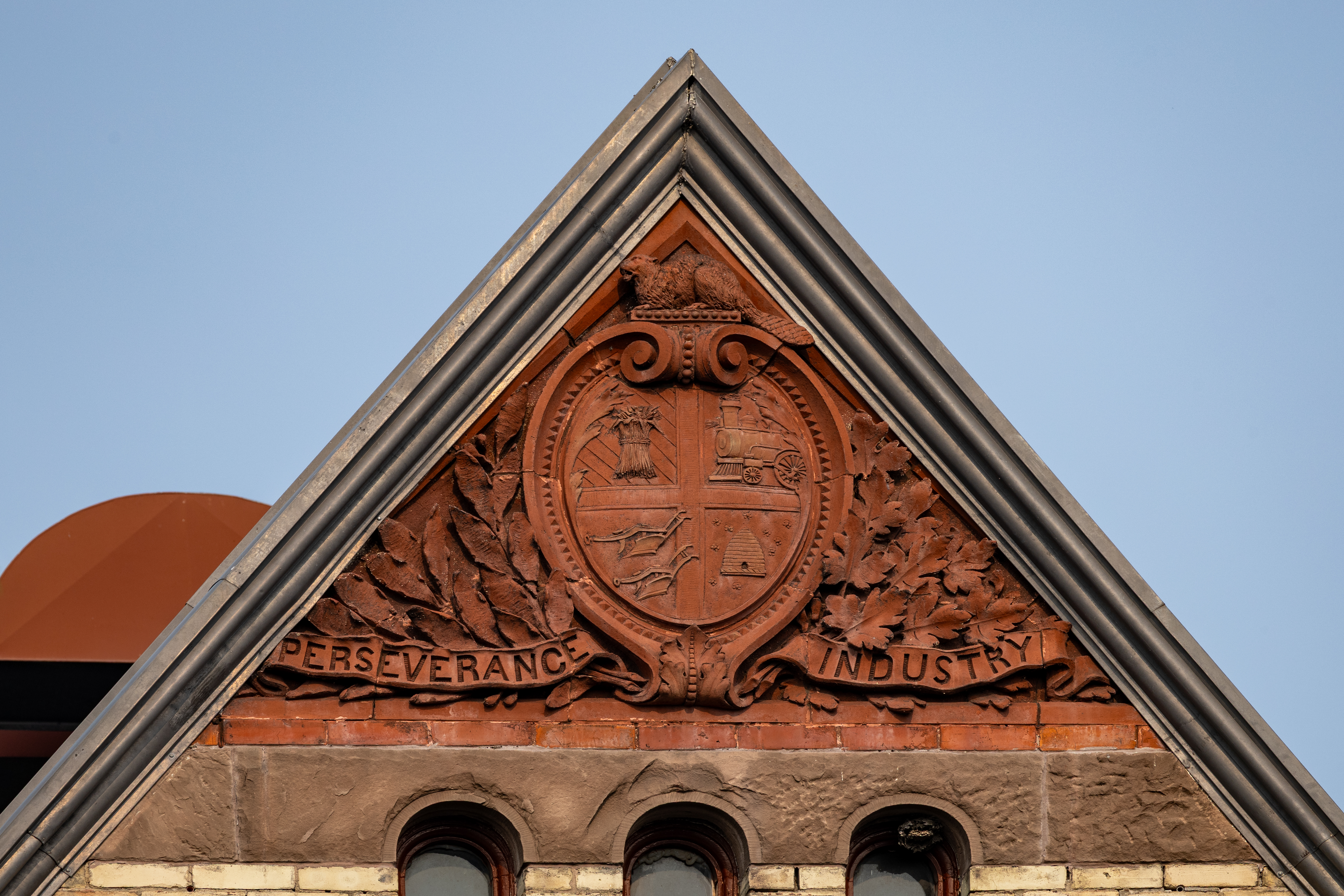
Perth County seal

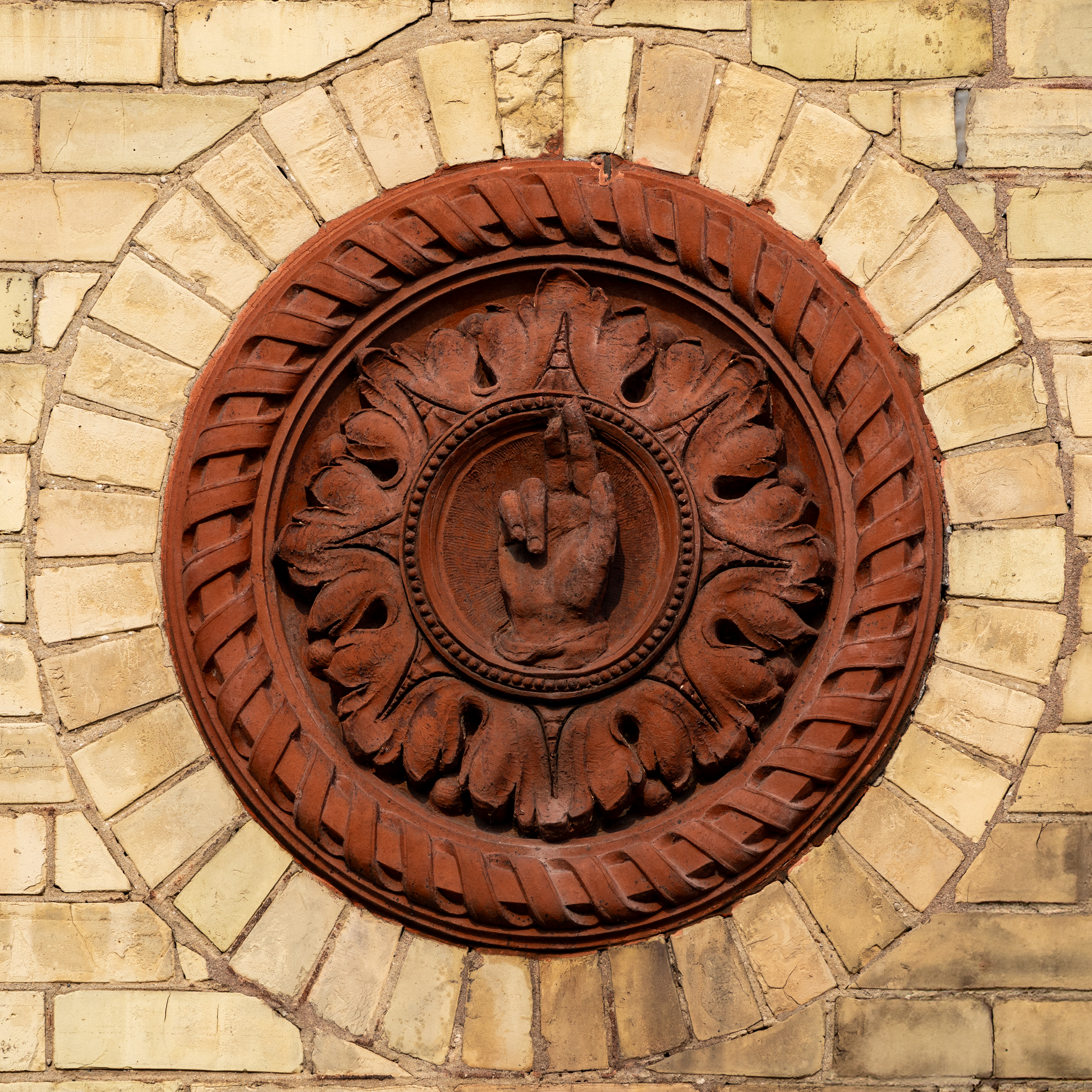
A benediction

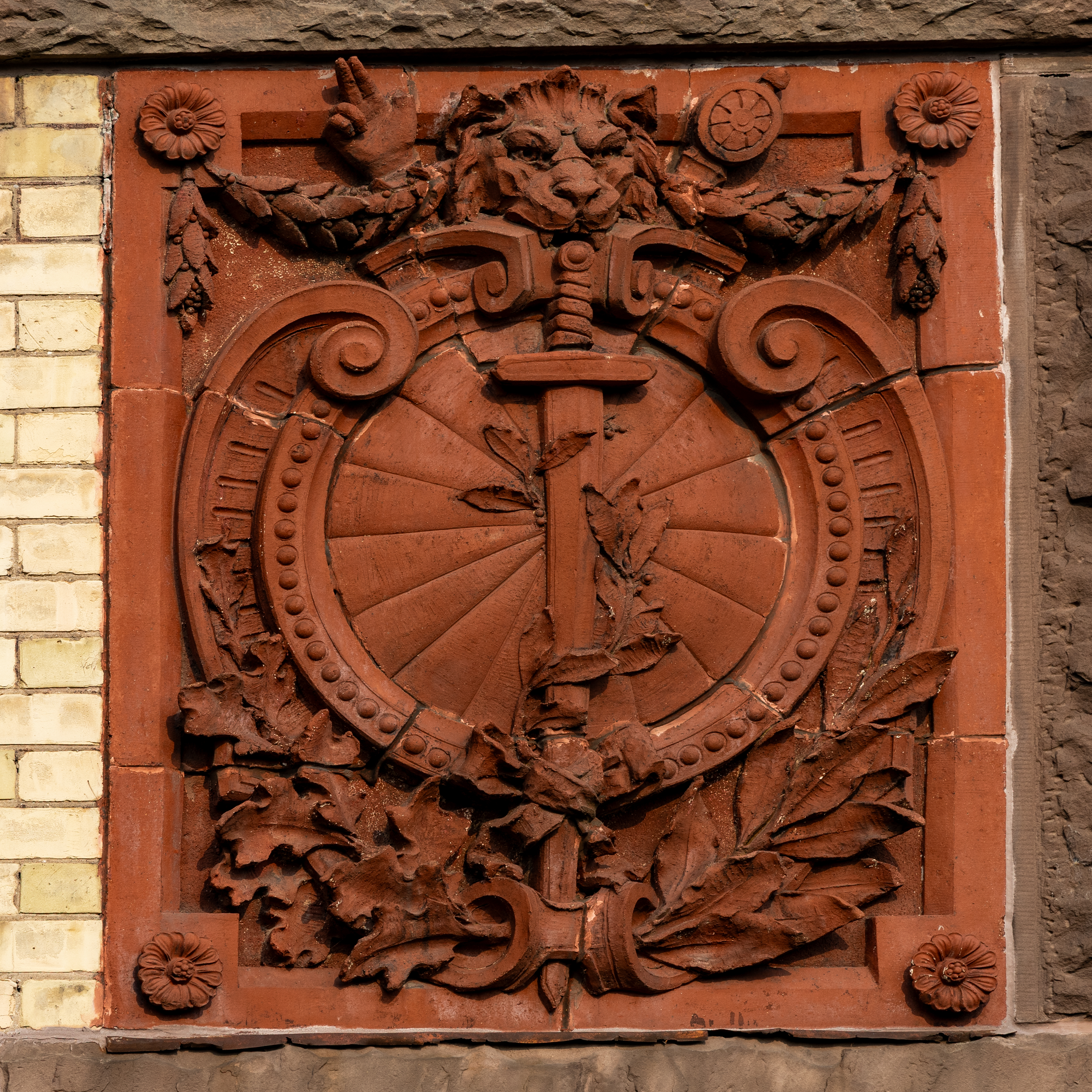
The sword of justice

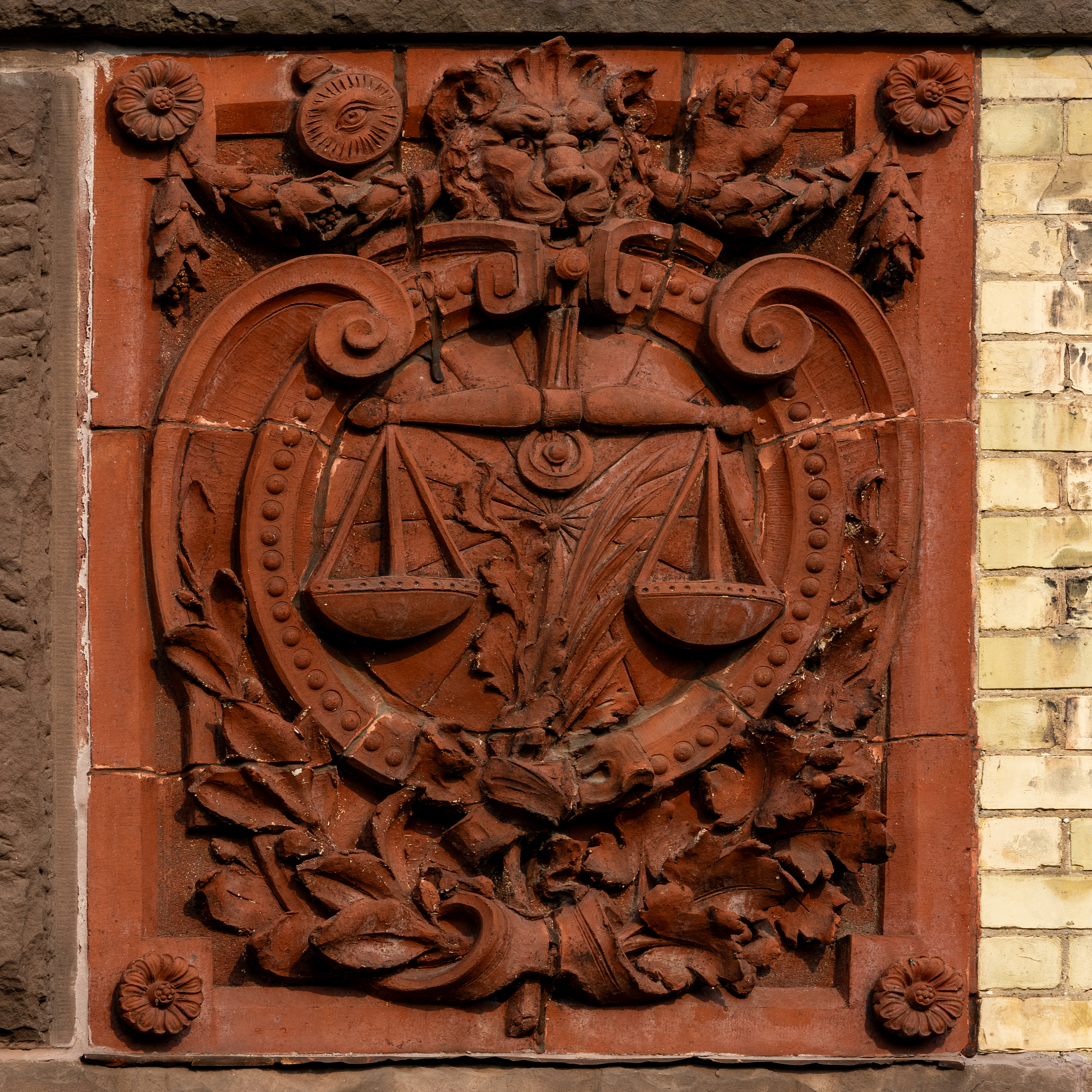
The scales of justice

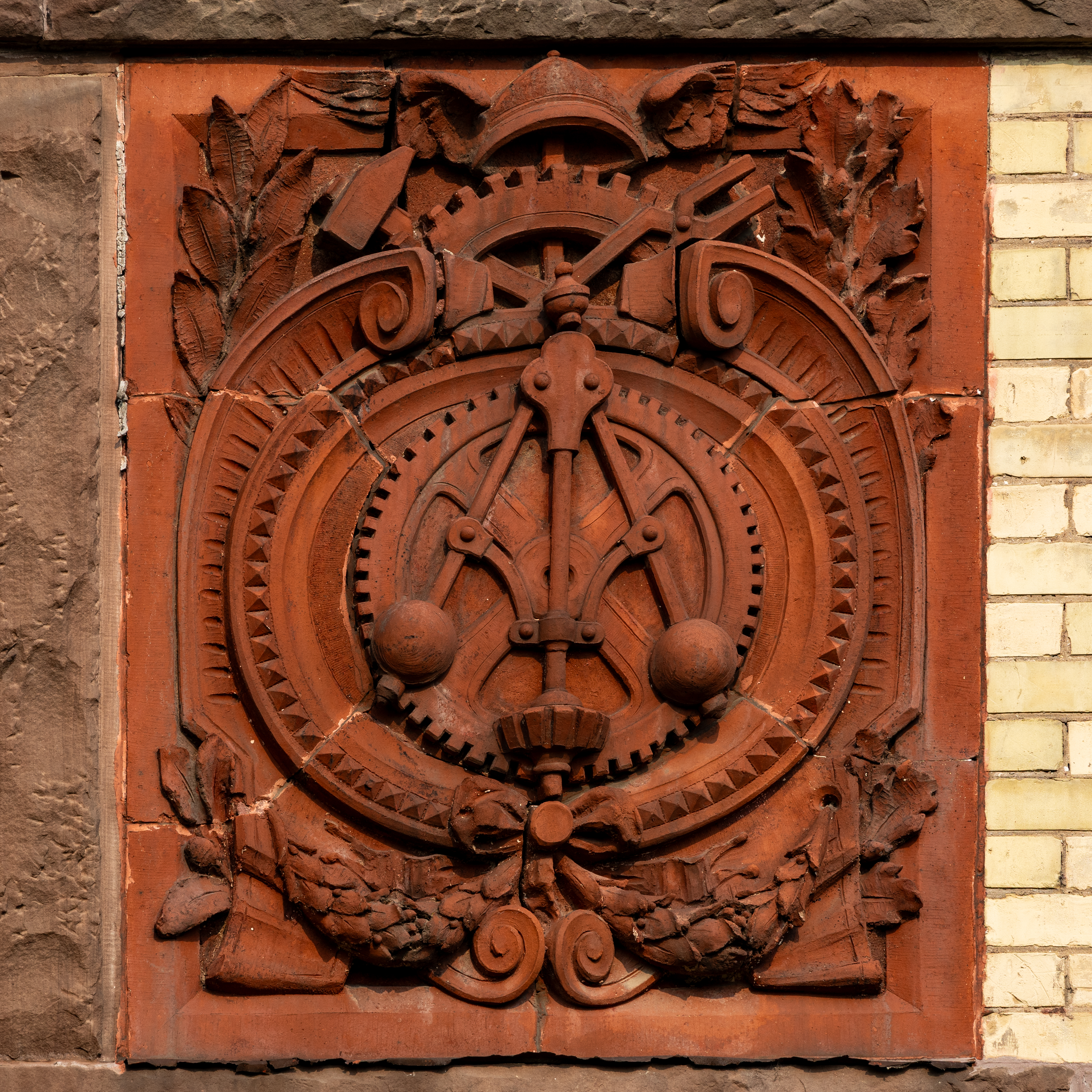
Tools of mechanics

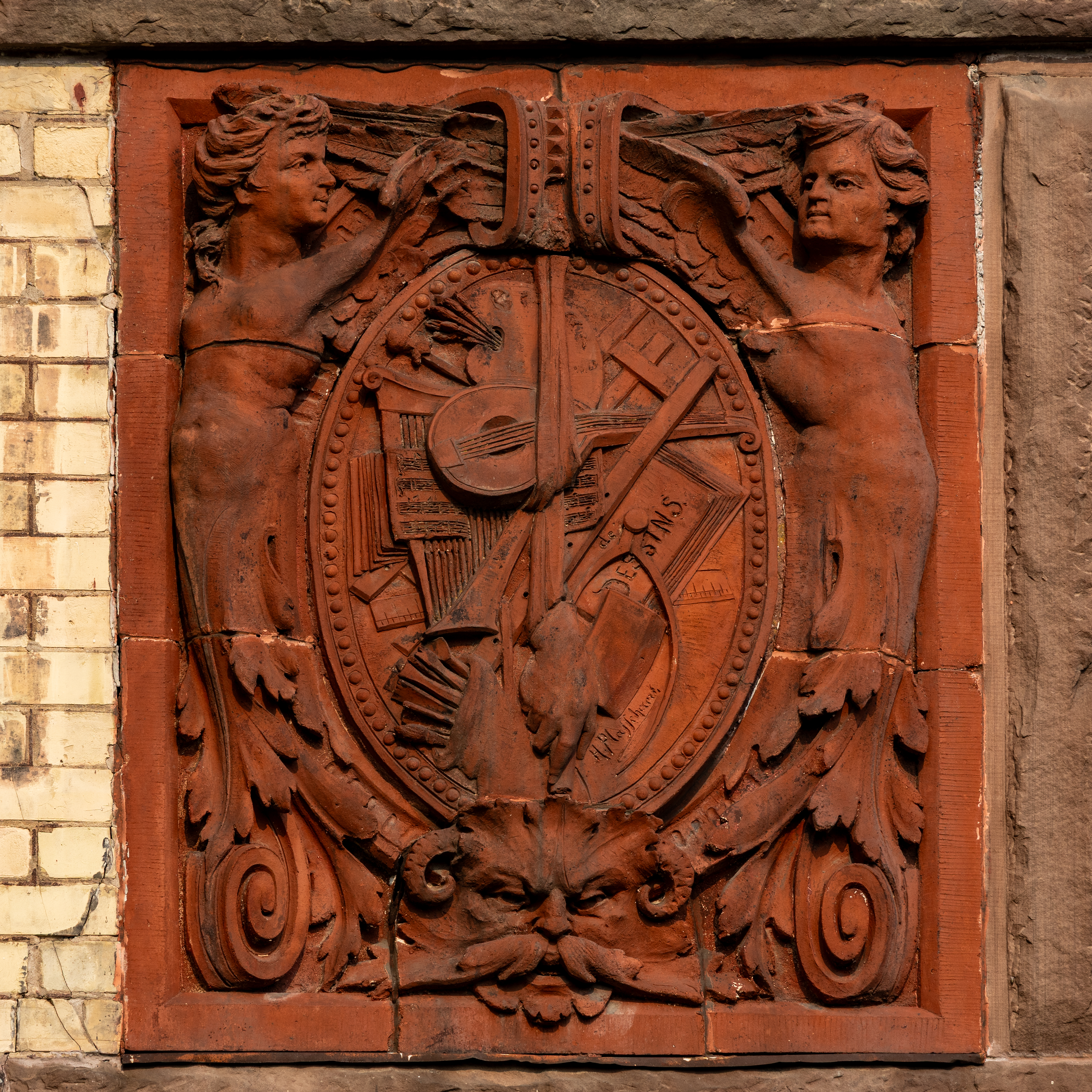
Tools of art

== Works cited ==
- "Additional Funds Requested for Perth County Courthouse Reno". Stratford Today. Stratford, Ontario. April 1, 2024. Archived from the original on April 6, 2026.
- Belton, Betty Jo (May 25, 2013). "Work Begins on Perth County Courthouse". The Beacon Herald. Stratford, Ontario. p. A10. ProQuest 2211212003 – via ProQuest.
- Belton, Betty Jo (March 22, 2025). "An A-to-Z Primer on the Stratford–Perth Archives". The Beacon Herald. Stratford, Ontario. p. A2. ProQuest 3180279633 – via ProQuest.
- Bent, Kelsey (June 26, 2025). "Perth County Council Returns to Courthouse, Votes to Renovate Chambers". Listowel Banner. Listowel, Ontario. Archived from the original on April 6, 2026.
- Brown, Ron (2006). Behind Bars: Inside Ontario's Heritage Gaols. Toronto: Dundurn. ISBN 978-1-55488-094-2.
- Cudworth, Laura (February 27, 2010). "Remains Discovered Next to Jail". London Free Press. London, Ontario. Archived from the original on March 1, 2010.
- "Discover Stratford, A Riverside City Full of Culture, History". The Toronto Star. Toronto, Ontario. June 19, 2021. ProQuest 2542604916 – via ProQuest.
- Freeman, Adele (September 24, 1981). "By Design: Exhibition Takes Up the Case of Ontario's Old Courthouses". The Globe and Mail. Toronto, Ontario. p. E3. ProQuest 386655489 – via ProQuest.
- Kelly, Anne (May 13, 1995). "County Wants Control of old Courthouse". The Record. Kitchener, Ontario. p. B3. ProQuest 275509657 – via ProQuest.
- Luczka, Connor (March 1, 2024). "Courthouse Renovation, More than Double the Original Budget, Delayed Three Months". Stratford Today. Stratford, Ontario. Archived from the original on April 6, 2026.
- MacRae, Marion; Adamson, Anthony (1983). Cornerstones of Order: Courthouses and Town Halls of Ontario, 1784–1914. Toronto: Clarke Irwin Inc. ISBN 978-0-7720-1387-3.
- Montanini, Chris (October 26, 2022). "Stratford-Perth Archives Celebrate 50th Anniversary with Unique Exhibit". The Mitchell Advocate. West Perth, Ontario. p. A2. ProQuest 275509657 – via ProQuest.
- "Perth County History". Perth County. p. 1. Archived from the original on April 6, 2026.
- Rice, Steve (February 10, 2016). "Cramped County Courthouse a Concern". The Mitchell Advocate. West Perth, Ontario. p. A5. ProQuest 2167316201.
- Roe, John (July 9, 1993). "Past Speaks to Today at Stratford Museum". Waterloo Record. Waterloo, Ontario. p. B4. ProQuest 275316472 – via ProQuest.
- Simmons, Galen (December 10, 2017). "Perth County Council to Hold Off on Declaring Former Registry Office Surplus". The Beacon Herald. Stratford, Ontario. ProQuest 2195006172 – via ProQuest.
- Simmons, Galen (February 13, 2018). "Heritage Stratford Extends Nomination Period for James Anderson Award". The Beacon Herald. Stratford, Ontario. ProQuest 2195597243 – via ProQuest.
- Simmons, Galen (March 17, 2022). "Perth County Hires NA Engineering to Manage More-than $1-million Courthouse-Elevator Project". The Beacon Herald. Stratford, Ontario. Archived from the original on April 6, 2026.
- "Stratford-Perth's Archivist Inspired Early Tours of County Courthouse". The Beacon Herald. Stratford, Ontario. September 29, 2012. p. A9. ProQuest 2209718658 – via ProQuest.
- Tausky, Nancy Z.; Distefano, Lynne D. (2018). Victorian Architecture in London and Southwestern Ontario: Symbols of Aspiration. Toronto: University of Toronto Press. doi:10.3138/j.ctvfrxbbj. ISBN 978-1-4875-8257-9.
- "The New County Building: Handsomest and Best Appointed Court House in Canada" (PDF). The Stratford Beacon Weekly. Stratford, Ontario. April 29, 1887. p. 1. Archived from the original (PDF) on April 6, 2026.
- Wilker, Paul; Conroy, Gord (July 5, 2024). "Streets of Stratford: Woods Street". The Beacon Herald. Stratford, Ontario. Archived from the original on April 6, 2026.
