= Volck =

Volck is a German surname. Notable people with the surname include:

- Adalbert J. Volck (1828–1912), American dentist, cartoonist, and caricaturist
- Adalbert Volck (1868–1948), German politician and founder of a Nazi front organization
- Alexander Volck, German writer

== See also ==
- Vock
- Volk (surname)
