= White Otter Castle =

House in Kenora District, Canada

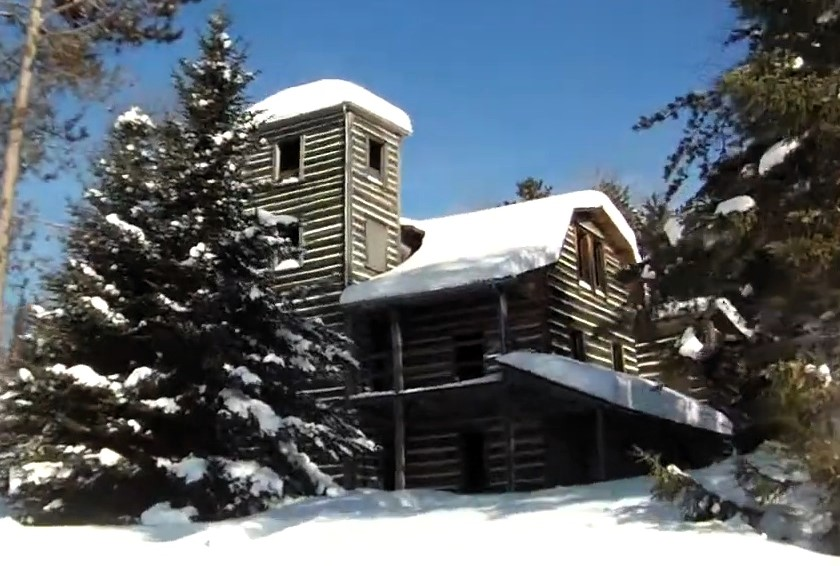
- White Otter Castle in snow, February 2019

- Location within Ontario
- Etymology: White Otter Lake

General information
- Location: Kenora District, Ontario, Canada
- Coordinates: 49°10′16″N 91°54′33″W
- Year built: 1903–1915
- Renovated: 1994, 2021
- Renovation cost: $237,000
- Owner: Government of Ontario
- Governing body: Ontario Parks

Height
- Height: 12 m (39 ft)

Technical details
- Material: wooden logs
- Floor count: 4

White Otter Castle is an elaborate 3-storey log house built on the shore of White Otter Lake, about 35 kilometres (22 mi) south of Ignace, Ontario, Canada, by hermit, trapper, and fisher James Alexander "Jimmy" McOuat. It is an example of typical log house construction at the turn of the 19th and 20th century, but remarkable "because of the uniqueness or ingenuity of the methods by which [it] came into existence."

Although within the Turtle River-White Otter Lake Provincial Park, the building is not recognized as a historic site.

== Construction ==
The "Castle" is a sturdy log house which stands 3 stories tall (8.8 metres, 29 ft), with a square tower extending up an additional floor (12 metres, 41 ft). The main part of the building measures 7.3 by 8.5 metres (24 by 28 ft), while an attached kitchen area adds a further 4.3 by 6.1 metres (14 by 20 ft) to the floorplan. It has 26 windows.

McOuat built his "castle" single-handedly beginning in 1903 when he was 51 and finally completing it in 1915. He felled and cut all of the red pine logs himself, which were between 30 and 40 metres (98 and 131 ft) in length and 50 centimetres (20 in) in diameter. He hoisted the finished, dovetailed beams (some of them weighing as much as 730 kilograms or 1,600 pounds) into place by means of simple block and tackle.

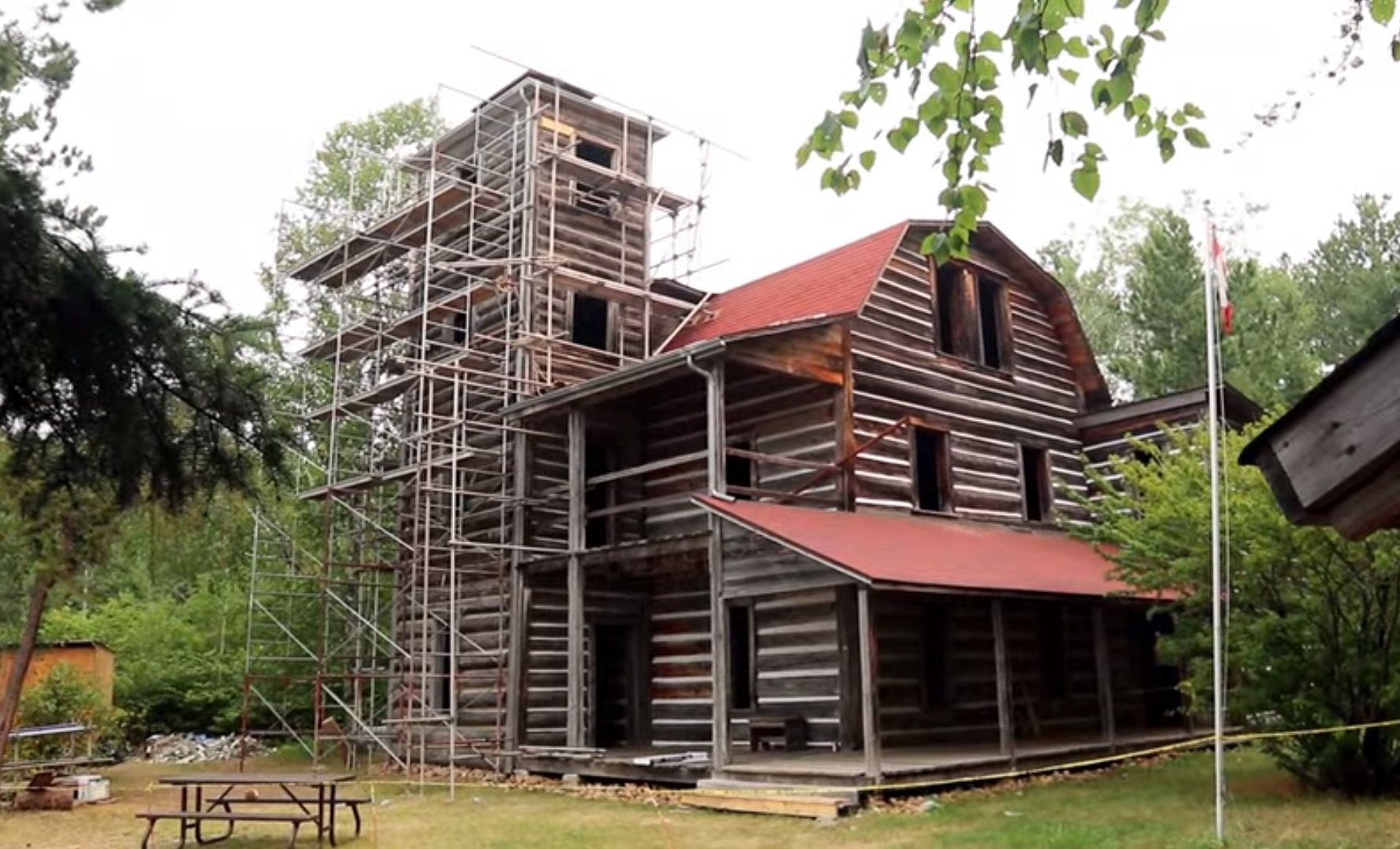
White Otter Castle restoration in October 2021

The log building was restored in 1994 and again in 2021. The 2021 restoration included structural repairs, new roof shingles, replacement of 5 logs, repairs to the chinking, new handrails, and site improvements.

== The builder ==
James Alexander McOuat (also spelled McQuat) was born in Chatham, Argenteuil County, Lower Canada (Quebec), on Jan 17, 1855. He was the youngest son of David McOuat and Christiane McGibbon, both of whom were born in Scotland and emigrated to Lower Canada in the early part of the 19th century.

As a young boy, Jimmy threw a turnip at an elderly neighbour who cursed at him and said "You'll amount to nothing and die in a shack." Years later, in his forties and farming near Rainy River, he invested all that he had in a gold mine on the Upper Manitou. He lost everything, including his land.

McOuat turned to trapping to earn a living and found himself on White Otter Lake, living in a rough trapper's shack. He became obsessed with what the old man said to him. Visitors to the cabin who met McOuat often commented that he would say "What do you think of my home - you'd never call that a shack, would you?"

McOuat is assumed to have drowned while netting fish in 1918. His body was discovered by forest rangers, tangled in his net, near a reed bed beside an island on the lake. The rangers had come looking for him after reports he hadn't been seen all winter. He likely drowned in late fall of 1918 and was found the following spring. His grave is next to the Castle.
