= Alexander Volck =

German scribe

Alexander Volck was the city scribe for the Wetteravian town of Büdingen in Hesse, Germany during the mid 18th century. He was, for a time, a member of the Moravian Church, but eventually left the church and became one of its most vociferous critics; authoring The Revealed Secret of the Malice of the Herrnhuter Sect, seven volumes printed between 1748–1751, which attacked Nicolaus Zinzendorf and the Moravian Church.

His work elicited responses from members of the Moravian Church and influenced other anti-Moravian authors. The Revealed Secret was circulated among Lutheran pastors working against the Moravians in Pennsylvania, Volck's work also spread rumors the Moravian Church was allowing women to perform in rituals reserved for ordained men, among others.

== Works authored ==
- Das entdeckte Geheimnis der Bosheit der Herrnhutischen Secte, 7 volumes, (Frankfurt and Leipzig: Heinrich Ludwig Brönner, 1748-1751).
- Unumstößliche Vertheidigung der Glaubwürdigkeit des entdeckten Geheimniß der Boßheit der Herrnhutischen Secte (1750).
