= Nordin, New Brunswick =

Coordinates: 47°1′16.1″N 65°32′27.9″W

Nordin is a community in the Canadian province of New Brunswick. It borders French Fort Cove and is now part of the city of Miramichi.

The former local service district of Nordin took its name from the community.

== See also ==
- List of neighbourhoods in New Brunswick
