= Ignace, Ontario =

Ignace
- Township (single-tier)
- Township of Ignace
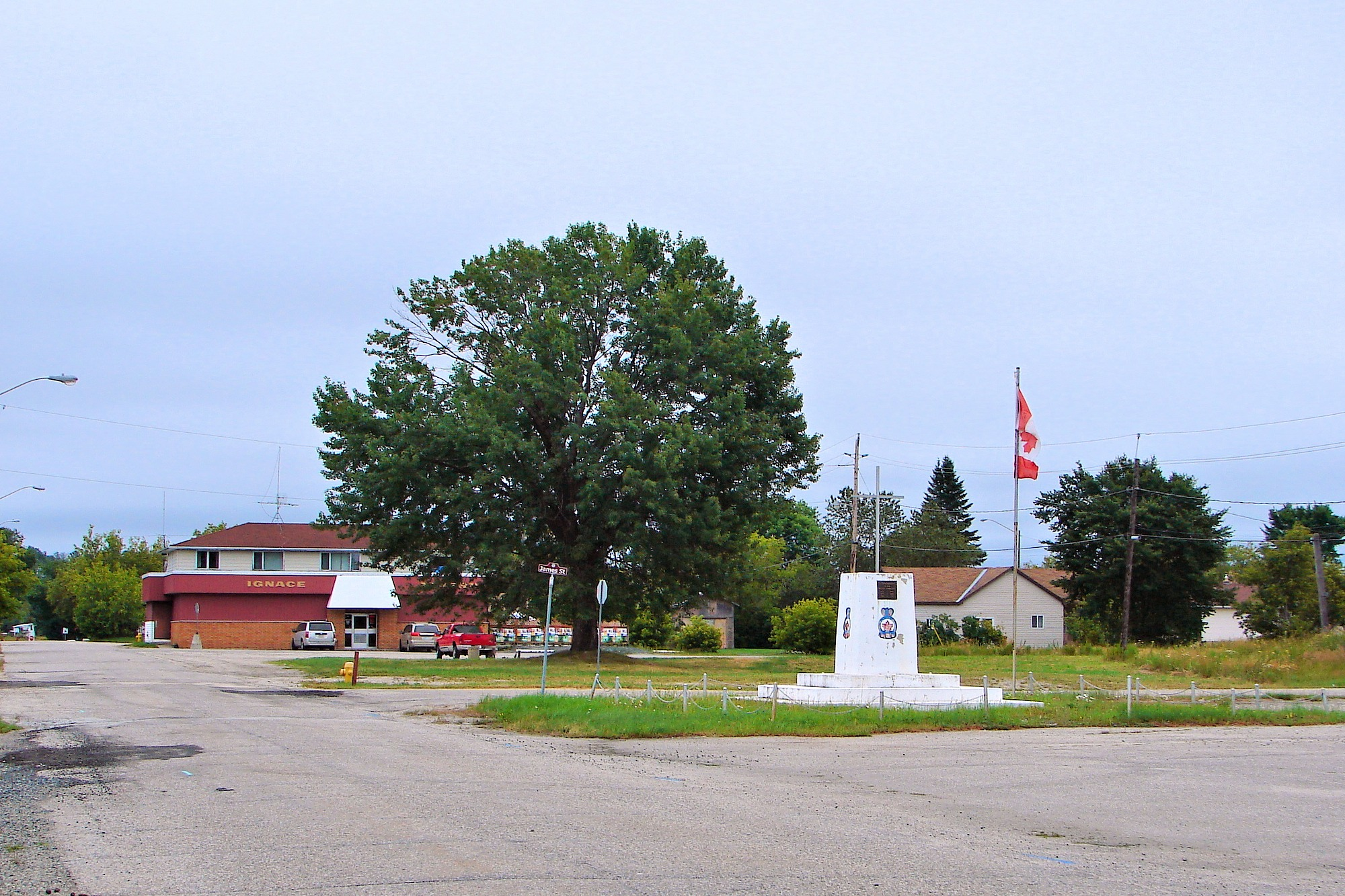

- Location within Ontario
- Coordinates: 49°25′N 91°40′W
- Country: Canada
- Province: Ontario
- District: Kenora
- Founded: 1879
- Incorporated: 1908

Government
  - Mayor: Kimberly Baigrie
  - Federal riding: Kenora—Kiiwetinoong
  - Prov. riding: Kenora—Rainy River

Area
  - Land: 72.13 km^{2} (27.85 sq mi)

Population (2021)
  - Total: 1,206
  - Density: 16.7/km^{2} (43/sq mi)
- Time zone: UTC-6 (CST)
  - Summer (DST): UTC-5 (CDT)
- Postal code: P0T 1T0
- Area code: 807
- Website: www.ignace.ca

Ignace /ˈɪɡneɪs/ is a township in the Kenora District of Northwestern Ontario, Canada, located at Highway 17 (Trans Canada Highway) and Secondary Highway 599, and on the Canadian Pacific Railway between Thunder Bay and Dryden, Ontario. It is on the shore of Agimak Lake, and as of 2021, the population of Ignace was 1,206.

== History ==
The town was named after Ignace Mentour by Sir Sandford Fleming in 1879. Ignace Mentour was the key Indigenous guide through this region during Fleming's 1872 railway survey, recorded in George Monro Grant's journal of the survey, Ocean to Ocean. Mentour had also served with Sir George Simpson in Simpson's final years as governor of Rupert's Land.

During Ignace's early days, there was a settlement of railway boxcars used by the English residents there called "Little England".

Although Ignace was incorporated in 1908, it was something of a latecomer to some modern conveniences, such as rotary dial telephone, which did not arrive in the town until 1956.

The town expanded during the life of several zinc-copper mines in the Sturgeon Lake area, 80 km north of the town. Today, forestry and tourism support Ignace's economy. One attraction is the three-storey log White Otter Castle, located on White Otter Lake at Turtle River, and built by James Alexander McOuat between 1903 and 1914.

In the 1950s, Ignace's first newspaper, the Village Tattler, started there to serve the town. It was published by the local YMCA. In 1971, Dennis Smyk started the Ignace Driftwood, which was suspended two years later, but was revived in 1979 and ran until 2018. During Driftwood's suspension, the Ignace Courier was published for the town's local news.

In 2021, as part of a search for a site for a deep geological repository for Canada's used nuclear fuel, the Nuclear Waste Management Organization (NWMO) drilled boreholes in a rock formation known as the Revell Batholith, located south of Highway 17, about 35 kilometres west of Ignace (between Ignace and Wabigoon Lake Ojibway Nation).

On November 28, 2024, the NWMO selected Wabigoon Lake Ojibway Nation and the township of Ignace as the site of a nuclear waste repository. Construction is expected to begin in the mid 2030s and become operational in the early 2040s.

== Demographics ==
In the 2021 Census of Population conducted by Statistics Canada, Ignace had a population of 1,206 living in 551 of its 664 total private dwellings, a change of 0.3% from its 2016 population of 1,202. With a land area of 72.13 km^{2} (27.85 sq mi), it had a population density of 16.7/km^{2} (43.3/sq mi) in 2021.

Canada census – Ignace community profile

	2021	2016	2011
Population	1,206 (+0.3% from 2016)	1,202 (0% from 2011)	1,202 (-16.0% from 2006)
Land area	72.13 km^{2} (27.85 sq mi)	72.82 km^{2} (28.12 sq mi)	72.66 km^{2} (28.05 sq mi)
Population density	16.7/km^{2} (43/sq mi)	16.5/km^{2} (43/sq mi)	16.5/km^{2} (43/sq mi)
Median age	53.6 (M: 55.6, F: 52.4)	52.5 (M: 52.4, F: 52.8)	48.1 (M: 48.6, F: 47.7)
Private dwellings	664 (total) 551 (occupied)	711 (total)	680 (total)
Median household income	$69,000	$60,928

References: 2021 2016 2011

Historical census populations – Ignace, Ontario

Year	Pop.	±%
1921	268	—
1931	388	+44.8%
1941	420	+8.2%
1951	458	+9.0%
1956	611	+33.4%
1961	735	+20.3%

Year	Pop.	±%
1966	795	+8.2%
1971	817	+2.8%
1976	1,983	+142.7%
1981	2,499	+26.0%
1986	2,314	−7.4%
1991	1,935	−16.4%

Year	Pop.	±%
1996	1,782	−7.9%
2001	1,709	−4.1%
2006	1,431	−16.3%
2011	1,202	−16.0%
2016	1,202	+0.0%
2021	1,206	+0.3%

Population counts are not adjusted for boundary changes.
Source: Statistics Canada

== Local media ==
=== Newspapers ===
- Ignace Driftwood – In 1971, Dennis Smyk started the Ignace Driftwood, which was suspended two years later, but was revived in 1979 and ceased operations in 2018. During Driftwood's suspension, the Mattabi Memo and the Ignace Courier were published for the town's local news.

=== Radio ===
- CBES AM 690 (CBC Radio One) – rebroadcast transmitter of station based in Thunder Bay
- CKDR-FM-1 97.5 FM – rebroadcast transmitter of station based in Dryden

== See also ==
- List of townships in Ontario
- List of francophone communities in Ontario
