= White Otter Lake =

Lake in Kenora District, Ontario, Canada

- Location within Ontario
- Location: Turtle River, Ontario
- Coordinates: 49°5′0″N 91°52′0″W
- Basin countries: Canada

White Otter Lake is a lake in Kenora District in northwestern Ontario, Canada.

== See also ==
- List of lakes in Ontario
- White Otter Castle
