= Charles Fenno Hoffman =

American journalist

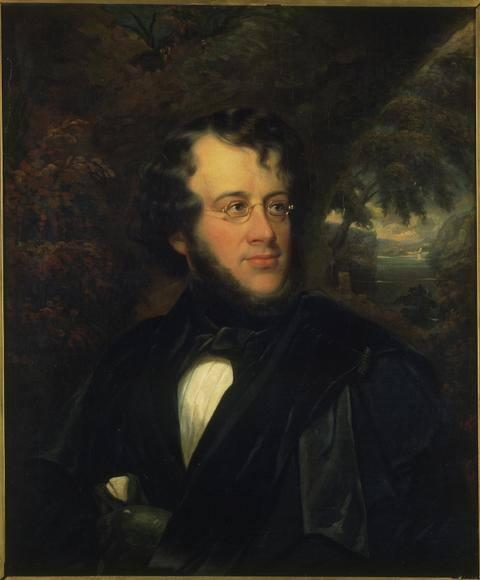
- portrait by Cephas Giovanni Thompson
- Born: February 7, 1806; New York City
- Died: June 7, 1884; Harrisburg
- Resting place: Christ Church Burial Ground
- Occupations: Writer, author
- Father: Josiah Ogden Hoffman

Charles Fenno Hoffman (February 7, 1806 – June 7, 1884) was an American writer, poet and editor, associated with the Knickerbocker Group in New York.

== Biography ==
Hoffman was born in New York City on February 7, 1806. He was the son of New York Attorney General Josiah Ogden Hoffman (1766–1837) and his second wife, Maria (née Fenno) Hoffman (1781–1823). His elder half-brother from his father's first marriage to Mary Colden was Ogden Hoffman, who served in the United States House of Representatives from 1837 to 1841. When Charles was 11 years old, his leg was crushed by a boating accident and had to be amputated.

Hoffman, who was proud of his ancestry, was the grandson of John Fenno, the Federalist editor of the Gazette of the United States. One aunt, Harriet Fenno (d. 1808), was married to John Rodman, the New York County District Attorney, and another aunt, Mary Eliza Fenno (d. 1817), was married to Gulian C. Verplanck, a New York State Senator and U.S. Representative. He was descended from Martin Hermanzen Hoffman, who emigrated to New Netherland in 1657.

He attended New York University and Columbia College, and studied law with Harmanus Bleecker.

Hoffman was admitted to the bar in 1827, but he practiced law only intermittently. In 1833, he led a group of other students in the Eucleian Society in establishing The Knickerbocker magazine, which he edited for the first three issues before passing duties on to Timothy Flint, who then passed them to Lewis Gaylord Clark. In 1835, Hoffman edited The New-York Book of Poetry which first attributed A Visit From St. Nicholas to Clement Clarke Moore. In 1836, Park Benjamin, Sr. merged his New England Monthly Magazine with the American Monthly and hired Hoffman as editor, though he left to join the New York Mirror a year later.

Hoffman's first book was A Winter in the Far West (1835), recounting his travels as far west as St. Louis, Missouri. It was followed by Wild Scenes in Forest and Prairie (1839) based on actual experiences in search of health. He wrote a successful novel, Greyslaer (1840), based on the murder of Colonel Solomon P. Sharp by Jereboam O. Beauchamp, known as the Beauchamp–Sharp Tragedy—an event that several writers, including Thomas Holley Chivers, Edgar Allan Poe and William Gilmore Simms, also fictionalized. Hoffman's version, however, had little in common with the true event.

Hoffman's fame rested chiefly upon his poems, first collected in The Vigil of Faith (1842). Literary critic Rufus Wilmot Griswold that year dedicated twice as much space to Hoffman than any other author in his respected anthology The Poets and Poetry of America. Griswold helped Hoffman publish The Echo, another collection of poetry, in 1844. Hoffman was also popular for his songs, including "Sparkling and Bright" and "Rosalie Clare."

Hoffman remained a successful editor and author throughout the 1840s. He officially began a new role as editor of The Literary World magazine on May 1, 1847. The weekly journal, which also included Evert Augustus Duyckinck and George Long Duyckinck, ceased publication in 1853.

=== Insanity ===
Under the strain of work, he went insane in 1849, supposedly after a servant used his manuscripts to start a fire. He was hospitalized briefly in April 1849 and, after his release, he accepted a position with the Department of State in Washington, D.C. By autumn, however, he was declared permanently insane. He spent the last 30 years of his life in the Harrisburg State Hospital, a state asylum in Pennsylvania. It was in Harrisburg that he was diagnosed with chronic mania, or manic-depressive psychosis.

Hoffman died in Harrisburg on June 7, 1884. He was buried at Christ Church Burial Ground following funeral services at the home of his sister-in-law in Philadelphia.

== Selected list of works ==
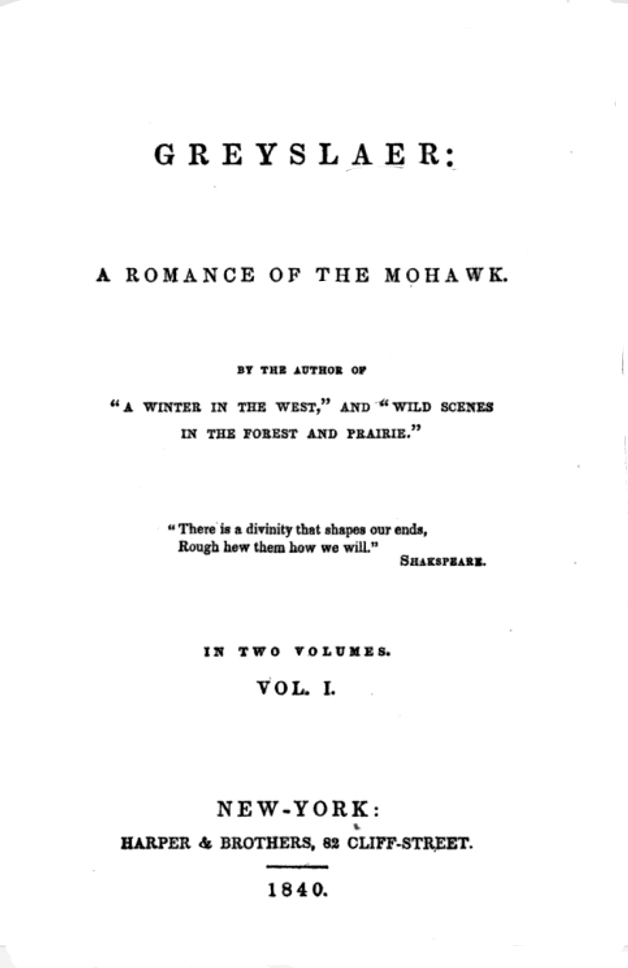
Greyslaer, 1840

- A Winter in the West (1835)
- The New-York Book of Poetry (1837)
- Vanderlyn; or, The Fortunes of an Adventurer (unfinished, 1837)
- Wild Scenes in the Forest and Prairie (1839)
- Greyslaer: A Romance of the Mohawk (1840)
- The Vigil of Faith (poetry collection, 1842)
- The Echo (poetry collection, 1844)
- Love's Calendar, Lays of the Hudson, and Other Poems (1847)
- The Pioneers of New-York (1848)
