= Duyckinck =

Duyckinck (/ˌdaɪ.kiːŋk/) is a surname. Notable people with the surname include:

- Evert Augustus Duyckinck (1818–1878), American publisher and biographer
- George Long Duyckinck (1823–1863), American writer
