= Charlotte Mary Sanford Barnes =

American actress and playwright

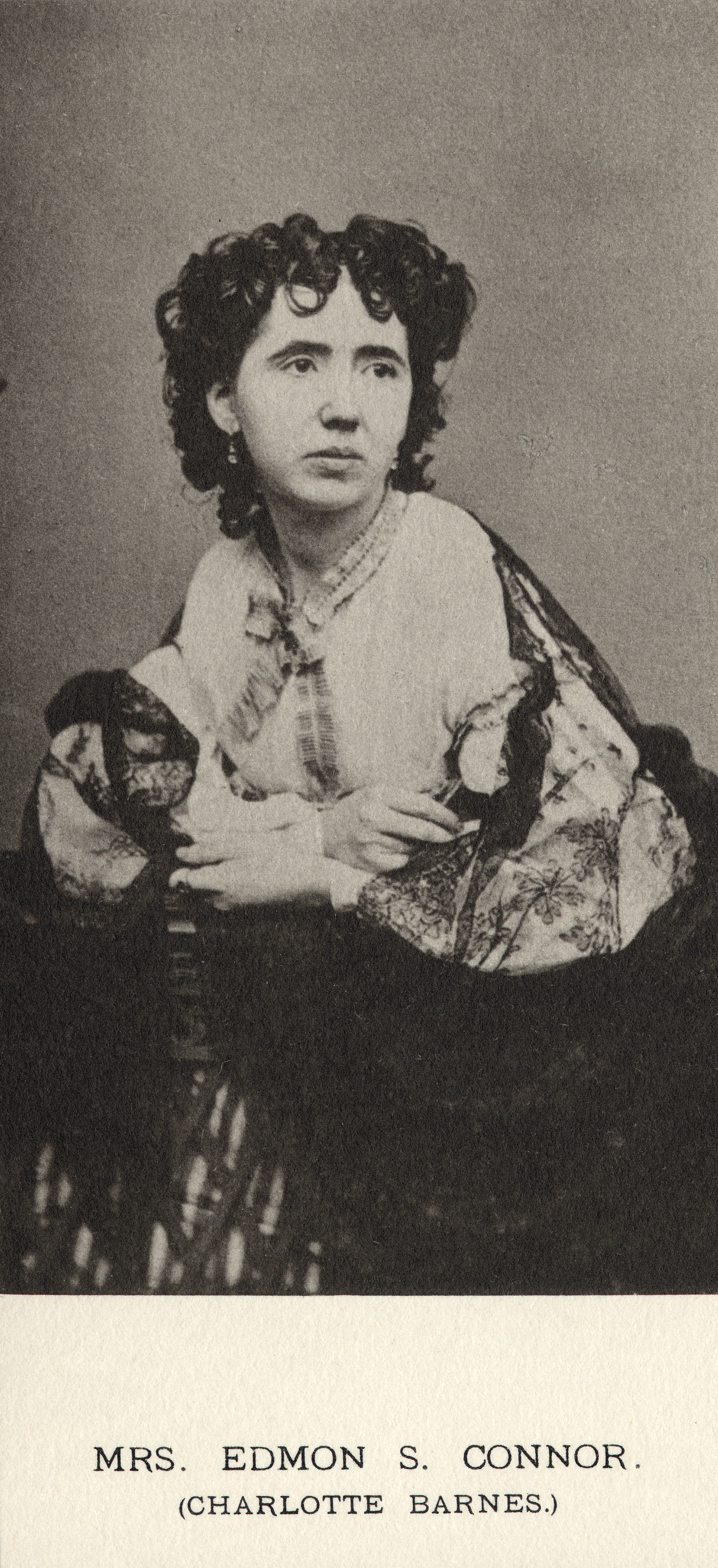
- Born: 1818
- Died: April 14, 1863
- Occupation: Writer
- Father: John Barnes

Charlotte Mary Sanford Barnes (c. 1818 – April 14, 1863) was an American actress and playwright, perhaps best known for her play Octavia Bragaldi, or, The Confession (1837). Aside from Anna Cora Mowatt Ritchie, she is considered the most successful female dramatist of early American theatre.

== Early life ==
Barnes was born in Massachusetts, the daughter of actors John Barnes (1761–1841), a popular comedian, and Mary Greenhill Barnes (1780?-1864), a distinguished tragic actress. She made her stage debut at the age of three on March 22, 1822 alongside her mother when they both appeared as mother and daughter characters in The Castle Spectre by Matthew Lewis.

== Career ==
At age sixteen, in the role of Angela in The Castle Spectre, Barnes made both her official debut, at the Tremont Theatre, Boston, and later her New York stage debut, on March 29, 1834. Her career as an actress received some acclaim, but some unfavorable comparisons with her distinguished mother.

=== Playwright ===
Barnes was much more successful as a playwright than as an actress. Her first play was a stage adaptation of the novel The Last Days of Pompeii by Edward Bulwer-Lytton. It was well received at the prestigious Camp Theatre in New Orleans, Louisiana, where she had been performing with her parents. She also adapted the Joseph Holt Ingraham novel Lafitte, The Pirate of the Gulf, about the French Gulf of Mexico pirate Jean Lafitte who helped win the Battle of New Orleans. It premiered at the Camp in the spring of 1837 and proved to be quite popular, especially in the south, and was being performed as late as 1850.

Barnes' first original play was the blank verse drama Octavia Bragaldi, or, The Confession, which took the Beauchamp–Sharp Tragedy (the 1825 murder of Kentucky legislator Solomon P. Sharp by Jereboam O. Beauchamp) and set it in 15th century Milan, a popular trope of the day. It premiered at the National Theatre in New York City on November 9, 1837 with Barnes in the title role. It was a success in both the United States and England, and Barnes and her husband performed in it many times, as late as 1854.

=== Later career ===
In 1841, Barnes and her mother, who was now retired from the stage, went to England, where Barnes acted in a number of productions, including Octavia Bragaldi. In 1846, she married the actor Edmon S. Connor. They appeared on stage together at the Arch Street Theatre in Philadelphia, which they later managed. Barnes' next original drama was The Forest Princess; or, Two Centuries Ago, about Pocahontas, which premiered at the Arch on February 16, 1848. Other Barnes works include an adaptation of the French monodrama A Night of Expectations, Charlotte Corday, based on the play by M.M. Dumanoir and Alphonse de Lamartine's work Histoire des Girondins, and an adaptation of the short play A Captive by Matthew Lewis.

== Death and legacy ==
Barnes continued writing and performing until 1863, when at age 45 she died after a sudden unidentified illness. Barnes' original works are collected in Plays, Prose and Poetry (1848), but her adaptations and translations do not survive. In an 1881 interview, her widower remarked of her, "She was a good woman and an excellent actress--kind, accomplished, good."
