= Edwin Percy Whipple =

American journalist (1819–1886)

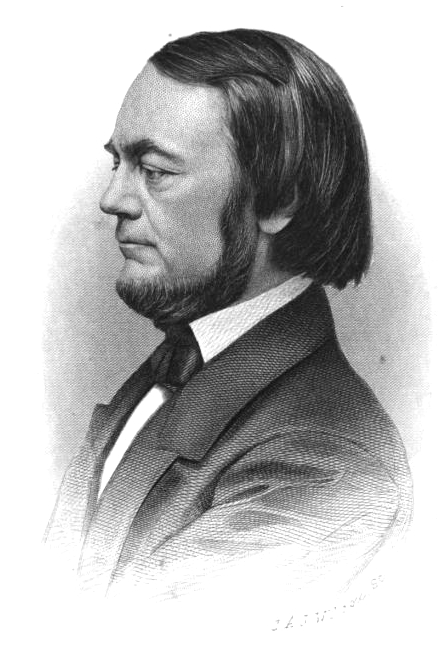
Edwin Percy Whipple

Edwin Percy Whipple (March 8, 1819 – June 16, 1886) was an American essayist and critic.

== Biography ==
He was born in Gloucester, Massachusetts in 1819. For a time, he was the main literary critic for Philadelphia-based Graham's Magazine. Later, in 1848, he became the Boston correspondent to The Literary World under Evert Augustus Duyckinck and George Long Duyckinck. Historian Perry Miller called Whipple "Boston's most popular critic".

Whipple was also a public lecturer. In 1850, he defended the intelligence of George Washington and compared him to other brilliant men of his time in a speech which later became known as "The Genius of Washington".

Whipple was a close friend of Nathaniel Hawthorne. After Hawthorne's death in 1864, Whipple served as a pallbearer for his funeral alongside Amos Bronson Alcott, Ralph Waldo Emerson, James T. Fields, Oliver Wendell Holmes Sr., and Henry Wadsworth Longfellow. Whipple's close relationship with other Boston-area authors occasionally tinted his reviews. Edward Emerson later noted, "No other member of the Saturday Club has ever been more loyally felicitous in characterizing the literary work of his associates."

Whipple died in 1886 and was interred at Mount Auburn Cemetery in Cambridge, Massachusetts.

== Selected list of works ==
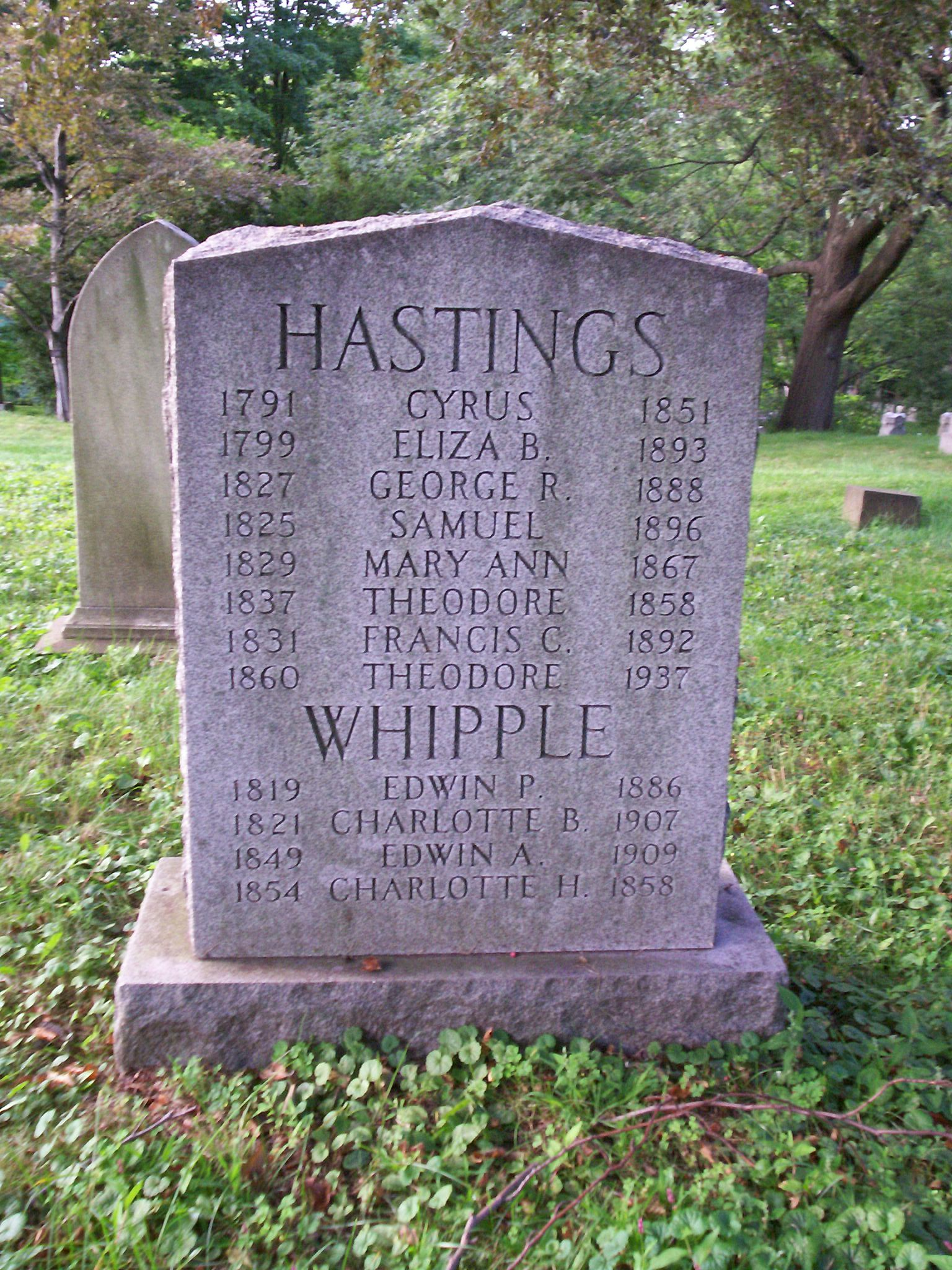
Family headstone for Edwin Percy Whipple at Mount Auburn Cemetery in Cambridge, Massachusetts

His first book was Essays and Reviews (two volumes, 1848), which was followed by:

- Literature and Life (1850)
- Character and Characteristic Men (1866)
- Success and its Conditions (1871)
- Literature of the Age of Elizabeth (1876)
- Recollections of Eminent Men (1887)
- American Literature and Other Papers (1887)
- Outlooks on Society, Literature and Politics (1888)

An edition of his Charles Dickens (two volumes, Boston), with an introduction by Arlo Bates, appeared in 1912.
