= Charlotte Barnes =

Charlotte Barnes may refer to:

- Charlotte Mary Sanford Barnes (1818–1863), American actress and playwright
- A character from the film Bandslam
