= The City in the Sea =

Poem written by Edgar Allan Poe

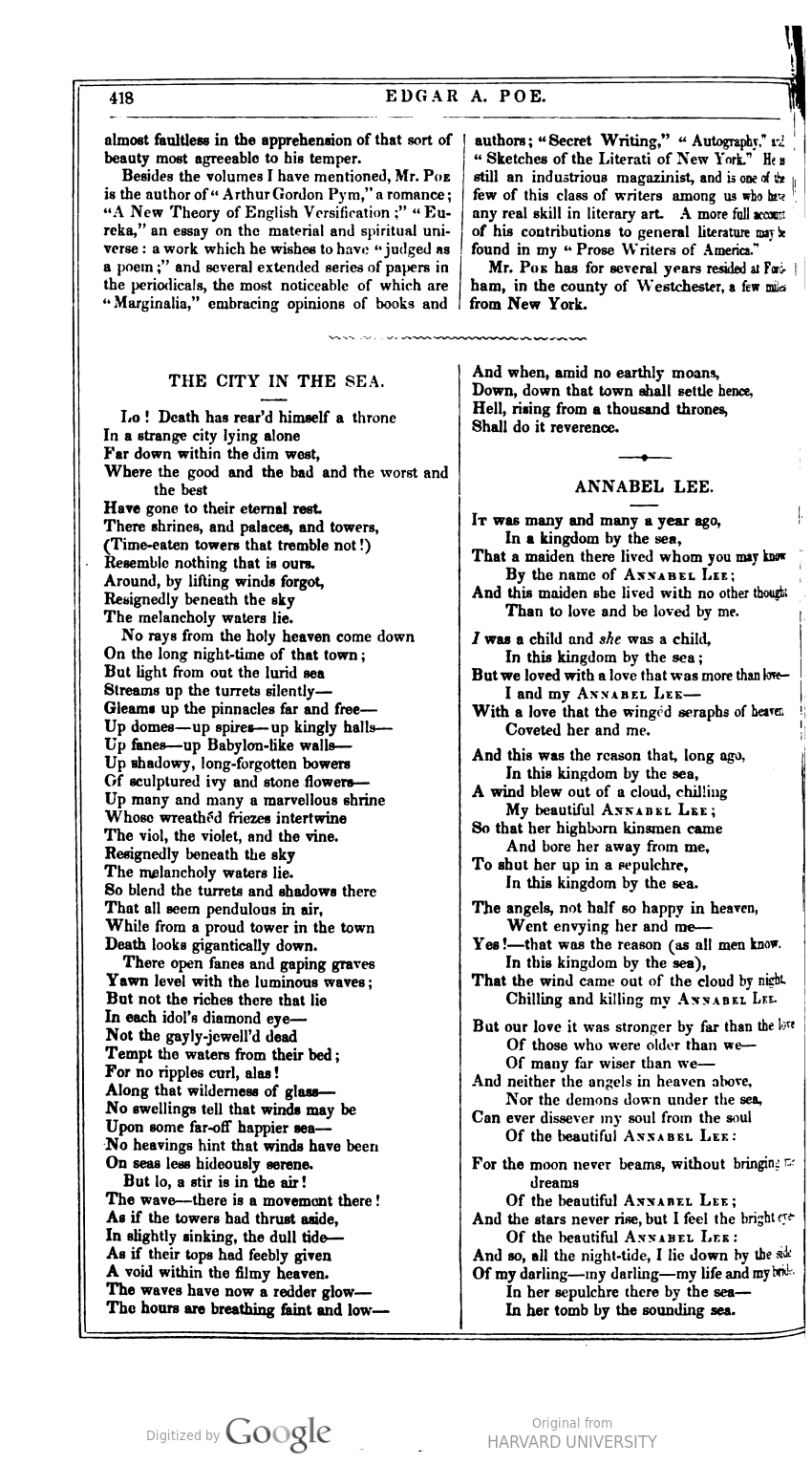
Publication with "Annabel Lee" in The Poets and Poetry of America, Philadelphia, Carey and Hart, 1850.

"The City in the Sea" is a poem by Edgar Allan Poe. The final version was published in 1845, but an earlier version was published as "The Doomed City" in 1831 and, later, as "The City of Sin". The poem tells the story of a city ruled by a personification of Death using common elements from Gothic fiction. The poem appeared in the Southern Literary Messenger, The American Review, the Broadway Journal, as well as in the 1850 collection The Poets and Poetry of America.

Poe drew his inspiration from several works, including Kubla Khan by Samuel Taylor Coleridge.

== Analysis ==
The city is one in the west ruled by Death who is revered above all: "While from a proud tower in the town, Death looks gigantically down." This is another classic Poe poem in that it deals with death and presents it in a non-conventional way. It is seen as a god that rules over a glorious, peaceful city in the west. There are "Domes and spires and kingly halls, and fanes and Babylon like walls" That the city is in the west is appropriate, because the west, in which the sun sets, has traditionally been associated with death. At the end of the poem a "stir in the air" or a wave moves the towers so that they create "A void within the filmy heaven." Poe speaks in the last part of the poem of the end of days when "the waves now have a redder glow, the hours are breathing faint and low." The waves turning red is a sign of hell's coming, because red is the color of fire and hence the color of hell and the devil. "And when, amid no earthly moans, Down, down the town shall settle hence, Hell rising from a thousand thrones, shall do it reverence." The last lines of the poem speak of the devil's gratitude to death in allowing him to come forth and rule over Earth.

In addition, the end suggests that this city is more evil than Hell for it will hold the city of Death in reverence. It is suggested that Death may be worse than the Devil.

The weird setting and its foreboding remoteness in "The City in the Sea" is a common device of Gothic fiction. This combines with the poem's theme of a self-conscious dramatization of doom, similar to Poe's "The Sleeper" and "The Valley of Unrest."

== Inspiration ==
Poe was inspired at least in part by Flavius Josephus's History of the Jewish Wars, a first-century account of the Biblical city of Gomorrah. The poem also bears a resemblance to Lucretius's classical poem "De Rerum Natura" and, specifically, an English translation by John Mason Good. Thirty-five of eighty-five consecutive lines parallel the work. Poe's last version of the poem may also reference Edmund Spenser's The Faerie Queene with the term "proud tower". The mood and style of the poem also seem to echo "Kubla Khan", a poem by Samuel Taylor Coleridge, known to be a heavy influence on Poe's poetry.

== Publication history ==
An early version of the poem, titled "The Doomed City", appeared in Poe's 1831 collection simply called Poems. It was reworked, as many of Poe's works, and published in the Southern Literary Messenger in August 1836 as "The City of Sin". It was first printed under the title "The City in the Sea" in the April 1845 issue of the American Review. The poem also appeared in the Broadway Journal, in the August 30, 1845 issue. It was included by Rufus Wilmot Griswold in the tenth edition of The Poets and Poetry of America in 1850, the year after Poe's death, as an example of Poe's best poetry.

== Critical reception ==
Poe was accused of plagiarizing part of the poem from a poem called "Musing Thoughts", first published in 1829 in The Token. Both poems include a line about a "thousand thrones". Even so, it is considered one of his best poems from his early years.

== Adaptations and influence ==
The Proud Tower by Pulitzer Prize-winning historian Barbara Wertheim Tuchman, subtitled "A portrait of the world before the War: 1890-1914", New York: Macmillan, 1966, derives its title and contains an epigraph from Edgar Allan Poe's 1845 version of the poem "The City in the Sea".

A performed version of the poem was included on the 1997 album Closed on Account of Rabies, though the name of the poem was given as "The City and the Sea".

Basil Rathbone narrated the story in the Caedmon audio collection Edgar Allan Poe: The Edgar Allan Poe Audio Collection, Caedmon Records – CD 4148(5), released on CD in 2000.

The German metal band The Ocean used "The City in the Sea" as lyrics, only swapping a few lines to fit rhythmical patterns of the song. It was used both due to the band's love of Poe, and the themes common to both poem and band. The song appeared on their 2006 album Aeolian.

The 1965 film City Under the Sea — also known as War-Gods from the Deep — is credited as being loosely based on Poe's poem, sections of which are recited by Vincent Price at the beginning, middle and end of the film.

In 1989 Danish composer Poul Ruders wrote a piece "The City in the Sea" (subsequently released on a CD by Bridge Records, New York) for Symphony Orchestra and Contralto, making full use of Poe's text. The composition is also available in a version for 11 instruments (2013).

The 2023 American horror miniseries The Fall of the House of Usher (miniseries) uses an edited version of the poem in its 7th episode entitled "The Pit and the Pendulum". The series itself is based on and includes references to several of Poe's works.
