= Politian (play) =

Play written by Edgar Allan Poe

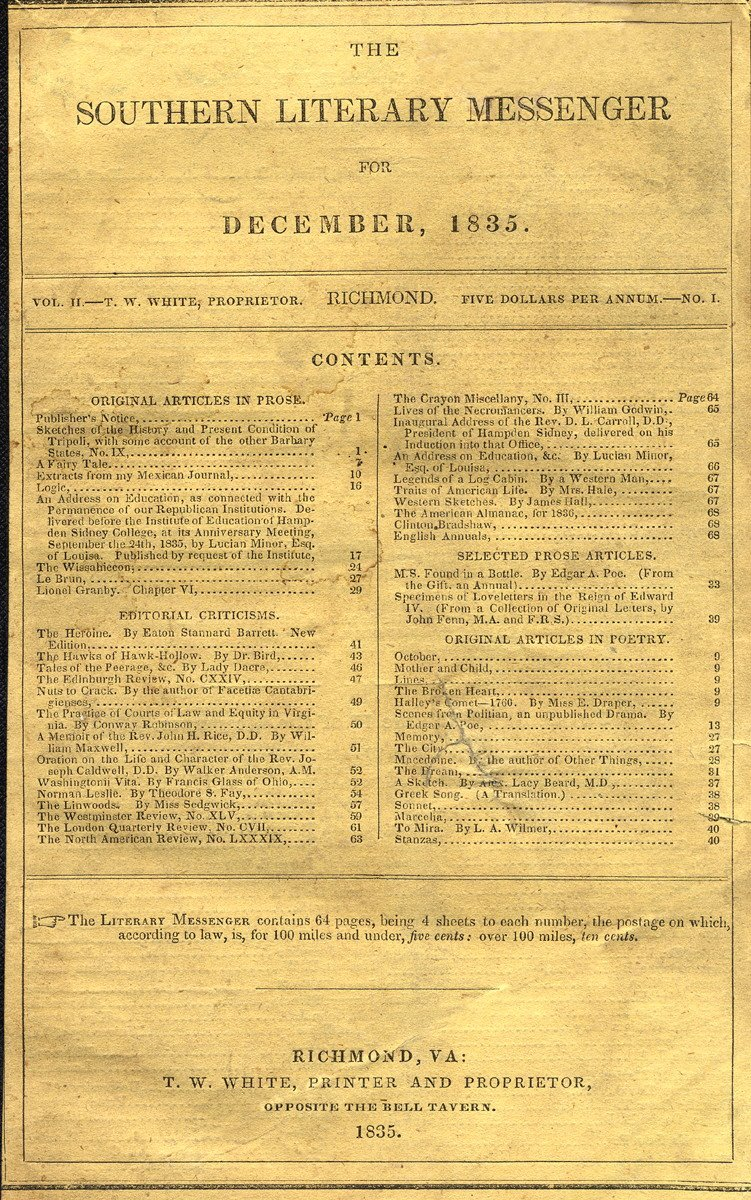
- "Scenes from Politian, an unpublished Drama. By Edgar A. Poe". Southern Literary Messenger, T. W. White, Richmond, VA, December, 1835.
- Original language: English
- Written by: Edgar Allan Poe
- Genre: Melodrama
- Setting: 16th-century Rome

Politian (1835) is the only play known to have been written by Edgar Allan Poe, composed in 1835, but never completed.

The play is a fictionalized version of a true event in Kentucky: the murder of Solomon P. Sharp by Jereboam O. Beauchamp in 1825. The so-called "Kentucky Tragedy" became a national headline and attracted several fictional representations. Poe, however, chose to set his version in 16th-century Rome. Poe wrote the play during his time with the Southern Literary Messenger and during some personal crises. The first installment of Politian was published in that journal in December 1835 as "Scenes from an Unpublished Drama". A second installment was issued in January 1836, but the play was never completed.

Politian did not receive good reviews. Its failure prompted Poe to stop writing longer works and instead focus on short stories.

== Characters ==
- Lalage, an orphan ward of Di Broglio.
- Alessandra, niece of Di Broglio and betrothed to Castiglione.
- Jacinta, servant maid to Lalage.
- Duke Di Broglio.
- Castiglione, his son.
- San Ozzo, companion of Castiglione.
- Politian, Earl of Leicester.
- Baldazzar, his friend; an imaginary figure.
- A Monk.
- Ugo, Benito and Rupert, servants of Di Broglio.

== Plot summary ==
The play takes place in 16th-century Rome. Castiglione, the son of a duke, becomes engaged to his cousin Alessandra, inciting the jealousy of his father's ward, the orphan Lalage. Lalage meets Politian, the Earl of Leicester, and, after some flirtation, convinces him to take revenge on Castiglione. In the drama, Politian recites the poem "The Coliseum", which Poe had previously published in 1833.

== Analysis ==
Politian was written in blank verse and styled after Jacobean-era tragedies. Like many of Poe's tales, Politian questions the finality of death or what happens when life is over. Politian proposes a suicide pact to an orphan named Lalage so that they can meet in the afterlife.

The title character is named after a 15th-century Italian poet, scholar and teacher named Poliziano.

== Inspiration ==
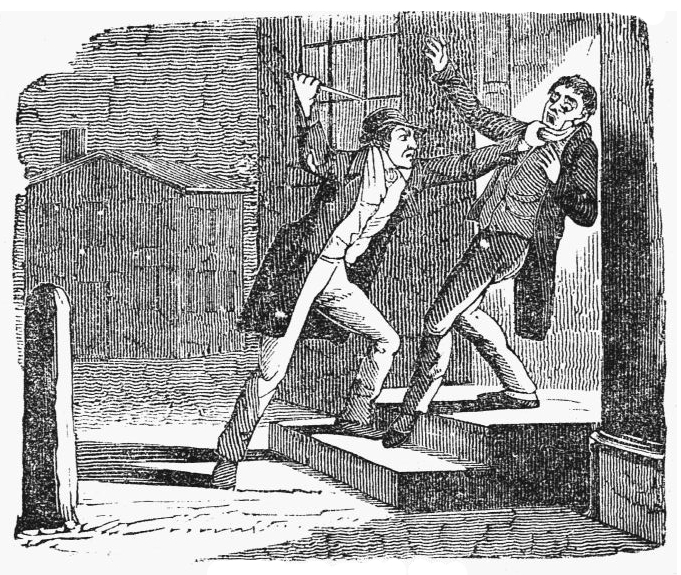
Politian is a fictionalized version of a true event known as "The Kentucky Tragedy".

Poe was dramatizing a murder which occurred on November 7, 1825, in Kentucky. Anna Cooke of Frankfort, Kentucky gave birth to the child of the state attorney general Solomon P. Sharp but married Jereboam O. Beauchamp in 1824. Cooke asked Beauchamp to murder Sharp as part of the agreement for marriage. He kept his promise, stabbing Sharp to death on November 5, 1825. He pleaded not guilty during his murder trial but was sentenced to be executed. Cooke attempted suicide by overdosing on laudanum on the eve of Beauchamp's execution by hanging on July 7, 1826. The story was widely reported in the newspapers. Poe's story also utilized other real-life historical figures; the Earl of Leicester stands in as Beauchamp and the character Baldassare Castiglione represents Sharp.

The true event, labeled "The Kentucky Tragedy", was fictionalized in many other works, including Conrad and Eudora (1834) by Thomas Holley Chivers, Beauchampe (1842) by William Gilmore Simms, and World Enough and Time (1950) by Robert Penn Warren. Poe would later fictionalize another murder story that became a national headline in his short story "The Mystery of Marie Rogêt".

== Publication and performance history ==
Poe met John P. Kennedy, an author himself, very early in his writing career. Kennedy admired Poe's writing, and encouraged him and promoted his work to publishers. In 1835, Kennedy wrote to the owner of the Southern Literary Messenger in Richmond, Virginia: "He is at work upon a tragedy", and he suggested that Poe be allowed to contribute something to the magazine. The publisher, Thomas Willis White, agreed, and Poe's first contribution to the Messenger was "Berenice" in April. Poe was then hired as a staff writer and critic beginning in August. Between March and November of that year, Poe contributed six new tales as well as the tragedy that Kennedy mentioned, Politian.

As Politian and other works were being prepared for print, Poe had difficulty in wooing his future wife Virginia Clemm. Emotionally distressed, he turned to drinking and White fired him in late September 1835. White wrote to his friend Lucian Minor, an advocate of temperance: "[Poe] is unfortunately rather dissipated... He is in addition the victim of melancholy. I should not be at all astonished to hear that he has been guilty of suicide". White's exaggeration may have started the rumor amongst literary figures that Poe was not sane. After his dismissal, Poe went to Baltimore, Maryland with the Clemm family.

White showed sincere concern for Poe's well-being and rehired him in October when Poe's personal crisis had passed. White wrote to Poe, "I should think there was hope of you... If you should come to Richmond again, and again should be an assistant in my office, it must be especially understood by us that all engagements on my part would be dissolved, the moment you get drunk." Poe returned to work in October; his dismissal had caused the cancellation of the October issue of the Southern Literary Messenger and the November issue was delayed to December. It was in this delayed issue that the first installment of Politian was published under the title "Scenes from an Unpublished Drama". Another installment was published in January 1836, though it was never fully completed, possibly because he considered the play unsuccessful or because Kennedy insisted Poe focus on "drudging upon whatever may make money". The entirety of the unfinished work was included in Poe's collection The Raven and Other Poems in 1845.

Plans were made in 1923 to stage a French translation of Politian by the Grand Guignol players; though an article about the project was published in the New York Times, the project was never completed. The first performance of Poe's original text of Politian was given well after its composition, on January 19, 1933, by the Virginia Players of the University of Virginia, under the direction of Harry Rogers Pratt; the production was co-sponsored by the Raven Society, a group dedicated to keeping Poe's memory alive at the institution he briefly attended.

== Critical response ==
Politian did not get many good reviews. Beverley Tucker wrote for the Washington Telegraph that he was disappointed after Poe "had taught us to expect much, for his prose is often very high wrought poetry". One critic for the Lynchburg Virginian wrote:

"Scenes from Politian", like the prose productions from the same pen (Mr. Poe) evince great powers, wasted on trifles. Why, (to adopt the catechetical style of his own criticism,) why does Mr. Poe throw away his strength on shafts and columns, instead of building a temple to his fame? Can he not execute as well as design?

Poe biographer Jeffrey Meyers faults Poe for not knowing enough about Renaissance Italy and for presenting a wooden hero in a melodramatic plot in an archaic style which "did not do justice to this tragic story". Despite the play being a tragedy, Elizabeth Barrett Browning wrote that "Politian will make you laugh".

After reading Politian, Kennedy recommended Poe return to writing poetry and short stories. Poe took the advice and went on to focus on shorter works after the failure of both Politian and his only novel The Narrative of Arthur Gordon Pym of Nantucket, which also led to his abandonment of The Journal of Julius Rodman. He chose to adapt to the literary marketplace, which then included a bustling newspaper and magazine industry in the 1830s. As Poe described years later, he joined in the effort of "Magazine literature—to the curt, the terse, the well-timed, and the readily diffused, in preference to the old forms of the verbose and ponderous & the inaccessible".

In 1845, Poe accused Henry Wadsworth Longfellow in print for stealing a quote from Politian for his own play The Spanish Student.
