= The Proud Tower =

1966 history book by Barbara Tuchman

- First edition
- Author: Barbara Tuchman
- Language: English
- Publisher: Macmillan
- Publication date: 1966
- ISBN: 0026203006

The Proud Tower: A Portrait of the World Before the War, 1890-1914 is a 1966 book by Barbara Tuchman, consisting of a collection of essays she had published in various periodicals during the mid-1960s. It followed the publication of the highly successful book The Guns of August (published in Britain as August 1914). Each chapter deals with a different country, theme, and time (although all relate to the approximately 25 years preceding World War I). Two chapters are about British governments in 1895 and 1910; one chapter is dedicated to the Dreyfus Affair in France; and another is nominally about the Wilhelmine politics of late 19th-century Germany, but is really about German music and culture in that period. Other chapters cover the United States (particularly the efforts of Thomas Reed, Speaker of the House, to overcome the tyranny of the absent quorum), the Hague Conventions of 1899 and 1907, the anarchist movement of the late 19th and early 20th centuries, and the activities of the Socialist International and trade unions.

The title of the book is derived from the 1845 Edgar Allan Poe poem "The City in the Sea". Two lines of the poem are used as the epigraph for the book: "While from a proud tower in the town/ Death looks gigantically down."

== Publication history ==
- Hardcover, Macmillan, 1966 (ISBN 0026203006)
- Mass-market paperback, Bantam Books, 1982 (ISBN 0553256025)
- Paperback, Ballantine Books, New York, 1996 (ISBN 0345405013)
