= The Poets and Poetry of America =

Popular anthology of American poetry

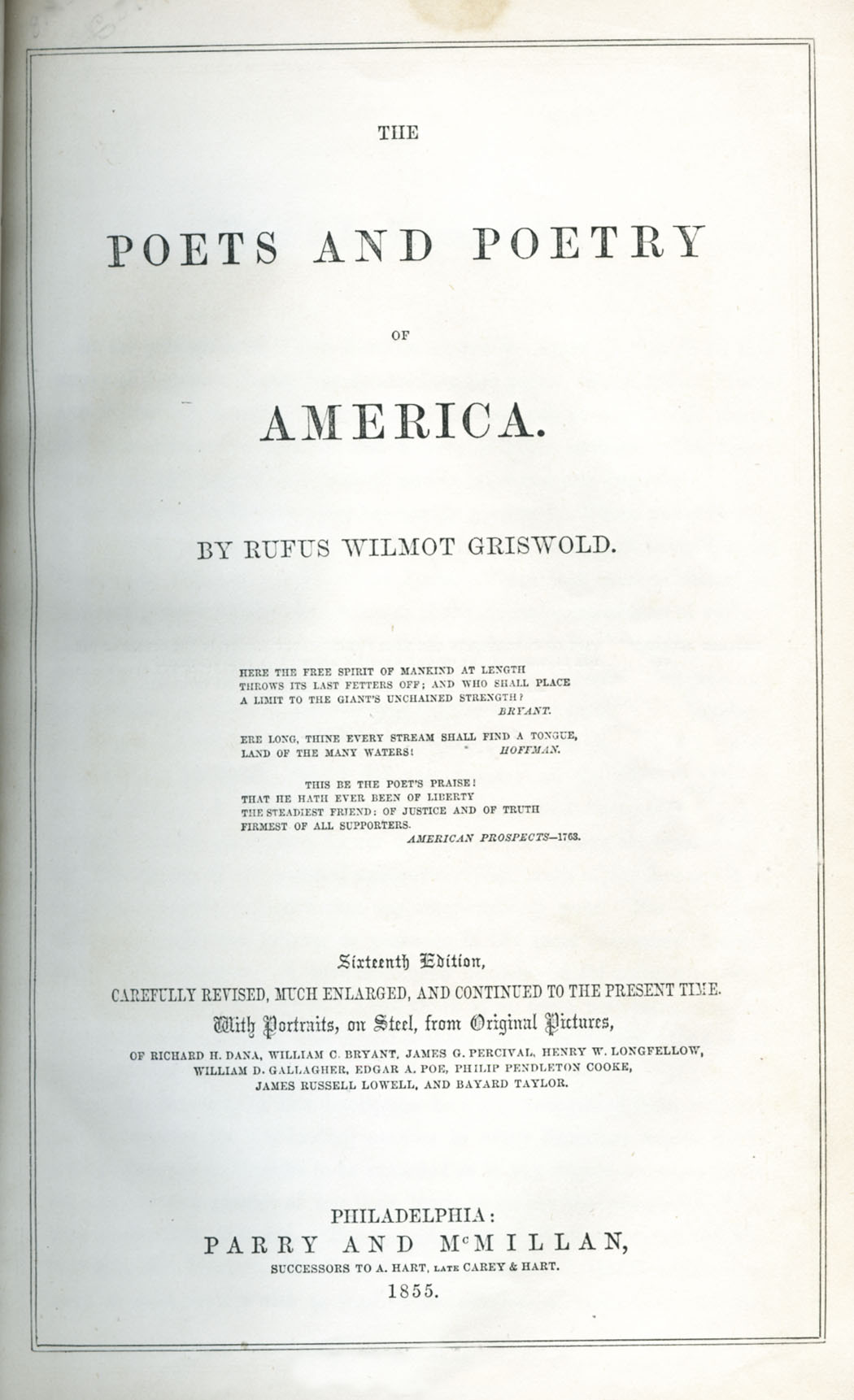
Title page of the 1855 edition of The Poets and Poetry of America

The Poets and Poetry of America was a popular anthology of American poetry collected by American literary critic and editor Rufus Wilmot Griswold. It was first published in 1842 and went into several editions throughout the 19th century.

== Background ==
Rufus Griswold had begun work as a critic working for the New York Tribune and Philadelphia's Daily Standard and earned his reputation as a vindictive and savage literary critic. He was also a proponent of American poetry. He claimed to have read every American poem published before 1850—an estimated 500 volumes. His nationalism was well known. Publisher Evert Augustus Duyckinck noted that "the thought [of a national literature] seems to have entered and taken possession of [Griswold's] mind with the force of monomania". His anthology was part of his ongoing efforts to promote distinctly American poetry.

== Publication history ==
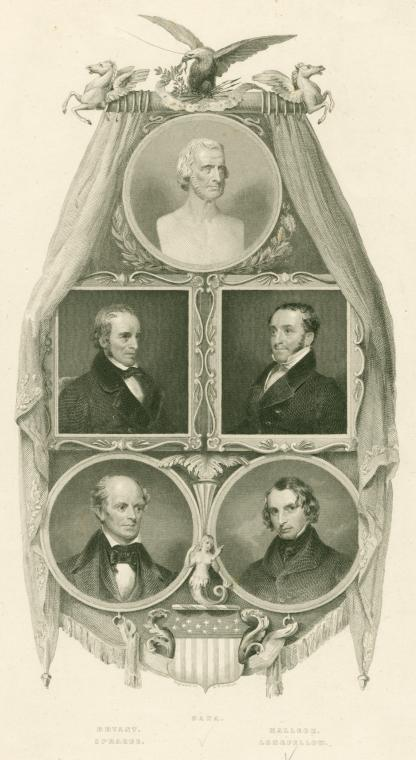
Frontispiece featuring images of popular poets including Richard Henry Dana Sr., William Cullen Bryant, and Henry Wadsworth Longfellow

Philadelphia publishers Carey & Hart wrote to Griswold in New York on April 18, 1842, "We have at last published the 'Poets & Poetry of America' & a handsome Book it is". The anthology was 476 pages and collected poems from over 80 authors, including 17 by Lydia Sigourney, three by Edgar Allan Poe, and 45 by Charles Fenno Hoffman. It gave prominent space to some of the most popular poets of the day, including Henry Wadsworth Longfellow and William Cullen Bryant. The collection was dedicated to Washington Allston.

The book proved popular enough that it went through three editions within only six months. A minor poet from Virginia named Daniel Bryan wrote of his disbelief at the rapidity with which the book went into new editions. "Is there not some of the 'trickery of trade' in this?—What was the am[ount] of the 1st edition—and may not the 2nd ed. have been printed at the same time the 1st was?" After Griswold's death, Richard Henry Stoddard revised the book and issued several new editions later in the 19th century.

== Critical response ==
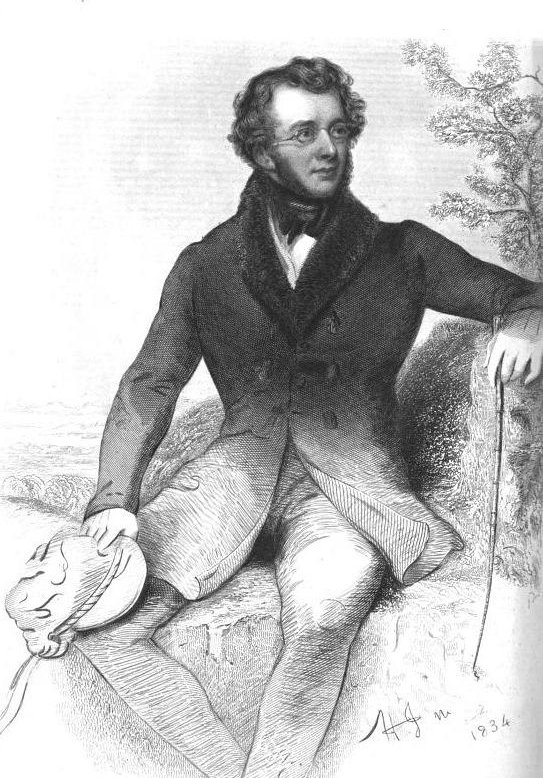
Charles Fenno Hoffman was allotted twice as much space as any other poet in the first edition of The Poets and Poetry of America.

The Poets and Poetry of America was the most comprehensive of its kind up to that period. After its release, it was called "the most valuable publication of the season" in the April 23, 1842, issue of the Saturday Evening Post. Critic Lewis Gaylord Clark considered it important to "become incorporated into the permanent undying literature of our age and nation".

Some critics, however, did not agree with Griswold's selections. The Albany, New York-based Poet's Magazine criticized the "undue prominence" granted to lesser poetasters, including Edgar Poe. Charles Fenno Hoffman, for example, was a friend of Griswold and, despite having little literary reputation, was granted twice as much space as any other poet. Responding to the idea that The Poets and Poetry of America represented the best that the United States had to offer, one British editor concluded, "with two or three exceptions, there is not a poet of mark in the whole Union". Modern scholars have dismissed the anthology as a "graveyard of poets" because many of the writers collected are now virtually unknown. Literary historian Fred Lewis Pattee called the book a "collection of poetic trash" and "voluminous worthlessness".

In his day, The Poets and Poetry of America propelled Griswold to a national spotlight in the 1840s and 1850s. His success led to future anthologies, including Gems from American Female Poets (1842), The Poets and Poetry of England in the Nineteenth Century (1844), The Poets and Poetry of England (1845), Prose Writers of America (1847), and The Female Poets of America (1848).
