= City Under the Sea =

1965 film by Jacques Tourneur

- Theatrical release poster by Reynold Brown
- Directed by: Jacques Tourneur
- Screenplay by: Charles Bennett; Louis M. Heyward
- Additional dialogue by: David Whitaker
- Based on: "The City in the Sea" by: Edgar Allan Poe; The Shadow over Innsmouth; by H. P. Lovecraft
- Produced by: George Willoughby; Daniel Haller
- Starring: Vincent Price; David Tomlinson; Tab Hunter; Susan Hart
- Cinematography: Stephen Dade
- Edited by: Gordon Hales
- Music by: Stanley Black
- Production companies: Bruton Film Productions; American International Pictures
- Distributed by: Anglo-Amalgamated; Warner-Pathé (UK); American International Pictures (US)
- Release dates: 26 May 1965 (United States); June 1965 (United Kingdom); 2 June 1965 (New York City)
- Running time: 85 minutes
- Countries: United Kingdom; United States
- Language: English

City Under the Sea (released as War-Gods of the Deep in the US) is a 1965 British-American adventure science fiction film. It was directed by Jacques Tourneur (his final film) and starred Vincent Price, Tab Hunter, Susan Hart and David Tomlinson.

The plot concerns the discovery of a lost city beneath the sea off the coast of Cornwall. Price is the captain overseeing a group of sailors who have lived there for more than a century where the peculiar mix of gases has allowed them to extend their lifespan.

The film was a period fantasy in the manner begun with Disney's 20,000 Leagues Under the Sea (1954). The film attempted to capitalize on the series of Edgar Allan Poe films that had been made by Roger Corman, starring Price. To this extent the film took the title of a Poe poem, "The City in the Sea", and attempted to exploit the Poe films' trend, even though the plot is only loosely based on the poem, with a recitation of the poem at the beginning of the film and a brief reprise at the end. The film was also loosely based on H. P. Lovecraft's novella The Shadow over Innsmouth.

== Plot ==
Around the turn of the century, American mining engineer Ben Harris is working on the Cornish coast in England when he finds a body washed up on the beach.

Ben makes inquiries at the nearby hotel. While talking to the hotelier's daughter, fellow American Jill Tregellis, and an eccentric artist, Harold Tufnell-Jones, a mysterious intruder appears but disappears.

Later that night Jill is kidnapped by gill men. Ben, Harold and Herbert (Harold's chicken) follow the trail through a secret door into the caves under the house where they are sucked into a pool.

They emerge in a cavernous city on the ocean floor. The city was built by a race of ancients who survive only as a breed of gill men. The city is now inhabited by a group of smugglers led by the cruel and tyrannical Captain who hid down there in 1803 and due to the strange mixture of oxygen have not aged in over a century. However, the volcano that powers the city has become unstable. The Captain now imprisons them until Ben can come up with a means of maintaining it.

Dan, one of the Captain's men who wishes to leave, offers to help the two escape, provided they use their influence to secure him a full pardon for his past crimes of smuggling. The Captain finds out and reveals that because of the gas they've breathed for so long, exposure to sunlight would cause them to age rapidly and die. Dan is then sent to the surface as a means of execution while Ben and Harold are granted an audience with Jill. Whereupon they meet Rev. Jonathan Ives, who had vanished several decades ago from the surface.

The Captain is shown to be under the delusion that Jill is his deceased wife Beatrice, who he believes has returned to him.

Realising that Ben and Harold are untrustworthy, the Captain decides to allow the Gill Men to sacrifice the two as a means to appease the volcano's wrath. While they await this, Jill and Ives free them and Ives instructs them all on how to escape the city. They try to persuade him to come with them, but he says he is too old and too tired to make it. The three make it to the airlock and trek across the ocean floor to a cave, containing a tunnel that leads to the surface.

The Captain and his men pursue them there, but frequent volcanic eruptions cause rockfalls that bury him and his men. Ben and his friends decide to return to the sea and attempt to reach shore on foot. The Captain meanwhile digs himself free and follows the tunnel to the surface, where the sunlight does indeed age him to death.

Ben and the rest make it to shore and watch as the volcano erupts, finally destroying the city.

== Cast ==
- Vincent Price as Sir Hugh, The Captain
- David Tomlinson as Harold Tufnell-Jones
- Tab Hunter as Ben Harris
- Susan Hart as Jill Tregillis
- John Le Mesurier as Rev. Jonathan Ives
- Henry Oscar as Mumford
- Derek Newark as Dan
- Roy Patrick as Simon
- Herbert as himself (Harold's chicken)

== Production ==
Shooting took place in the United Kingdom. Charles Bennett says he wrote a good script and AIP wanted him to come to Britain to work on the script but would not pay his way. The script was rewritten in Britain by Louis M. Heyward. Bennett hated the changes and called the resulting film "the worst thing I was ever involved in." It was one of a series of co productions between AIP and Anglo Amalgamated around this time.

According to Susan Hart, Charles Bennett's original script was good but was heavily rewritten. She also says there was tension between producers Dan Haller and his British counterpart George Willoughby.

Louis M. Heyward confirms this tension and admits to rewriting the script to add humour; in particular, he says he added the comic chicken and introduced the character played by David Tomlinson. Heyward says that Willoughby quit after these changes.

== Reception ==
The film was released in New York on a double bill with Beach Blanket Bingo. The reviewer for The New York Times thought it was the better of the two movies, calling it "a briny safari".

== Comic book adaption ==
- Dell Movie Classic: War-Gods of the Deep (July–September 1965)

== See also ==
- List of underwater science fiction works
- The Shadow over Innsmouth by H. P. Lovecraft.
