= The Literary World (New York City) =

American Magazine

The Literary World was a weekly American magazine founded in February 1847 by Osgood and Company in New York City. It closed in 1853 following a fire. It has been described as "the first important American weekly to be devoted chiefly to the discussion of current books" and is said to "contain much valuable material on the development of American literature from 1847 to 1852".

The editor for the first issues was Evert Augustus Duyckinck but was succeeded in May 1847 by Charles Fenno Hoffman. During this time, the magazine's content mainly included reviews of books as well as fine arts, drama and music. In October 1848, Duyckinck and his brother George Long Duyckinck purchased the magazine and became both its publishers and its editors. They introduced travel sketches, politics, social matters and translations to the content.

It was also published in volumes:

- Volume I, February - July 1847
- Volume II, August 1847 - January 1848
- Volume III, February - December 1848
- Volume IV - XIII, 1849 - 1853, regular semi-annual volumes.
