= Solomon P. Sharp =

American politician (1787–1825)

Solomon Sharp
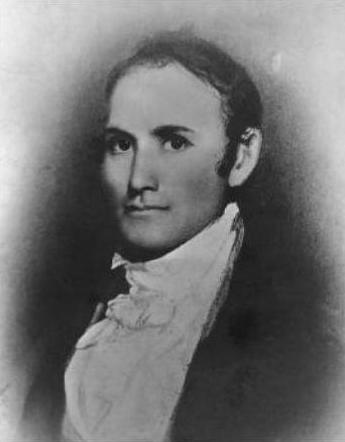

6th Attorney General of Kentucky
- In office October 30, 1821 – November 7, 1825
- Governor: John Adair; Joseph Desha
- Preceded by: Ben Hardin
- Succeeded by: Frederick Grayson

Member of the U.S. House of Representatives from Kentucky's 6th district
- In office March 4, 1813 – March 3, 1817
- Preceded by: Joseph Desha
- Succeeded by: David Walker

Personal details
- Born: Solomon Porcius Sharp; August 22, 1787 Abingdon, Virginia, U.S.
- Died: November 7, 1825 (aged 38) Frankfort, Kentucky, U.S.
- Resting place: Frankfort Cemetery
- Party: Democratic-Republican
- Spouse: Eliza Scott
- Children: 3

Military service
- Allegiance: United States
- Branch/service: Kentucky militia
- Years of service: 1812
- Rank: Colonel
- Battles/wars: War of 1812

Solomon Porcius Sharp (August 22, 1787 – November 7, 1825) was an American lawyer and politician, serving as attorney general of Kentucky and a member of the United States Congress and the Kentucky General Assembly. His murder by Jereboam O. Beauchamp in 1825 is referred to as the Beauchamp–Sharp Tragedy or "The Kentucky Tragedy."

Sharp began his political career representing Warren County in the Kentucky House of Representatives. He briefly served in the War of 1812, then returned to Kentucky and was elected to the U.S. House of Representatives in 1813. He was re-elected to a second term, though his support of a controversial bill regarding legislator salaries cost him his seat in 1816. Allied with Kentucky's Debt Relief Party, he returned to the Kentucky House in 1817; in 1821, he accepted Governor John Adair's appointment to the post of Attorney General of Kentucky. Adair's successor, Joseph Desha, re-appointed him to this position. In 1825, Sharp resigned as attorney general to return to the Kentucky House.

In 1820, rumors surfaced that Sharp had fathered a stillborn illegitimate child with Anna Cooke, a planter's daughter. Sharp denied the charge and the immediate political effects were minimal. When the charges were repeated during Sharp's 1825 General Assembly campaign, opponents publicized the allegation that the child was a mulatto. Whether Sharp made such a claim, or whether it was a rumor started by his political enemies, remains in doubt. Jereboam Beauchamp, who had married Cooke in 1824, avenged the honor of his wife by fatally stabbing Sharp at his home early on the morning of November 7, 1825. Sharp's murder inspired fictional works, most notably Edgar Allan Poe's unfinished play Politian and Robert Penn Warren's novel World Enough and Time (1950).

== Personal life ==
Solomon Sharp was born on August 22, 1787, at Abingdon, Virginia. He was the fifth child and third son of Captain Thomas and Jean (Maxwell) Sharp, a Scottish woman. Through the male line he was a great-great-grandson of John Sharp, Archbishop of York. His father Thomas Sharp was a veteran of the Revolutionary War, participating in the Battle of King's Mountain. The family briefly moved to the area near Nashville, Tennessee, and to North Carolina before settling permanently about 1795 at Russellville, Logan County where they lived in a log cabin near the Muddy River.

Sharp "[intermittently attended] one of Logan County's academies" during his childhood years; the schools of Logan County were primitive at the time. He read the law and was admitted to the bar in 1806. He opened a practice in Russellville, but soon relocated to the busier Warren County seat of Bowling Green, which had 154 residents in 1810. He engaged in land speculation, sometimes in partnership with his brother, Dr. Leander Sharp, and by 1824, had acquired 11,000 acres, mostly north of the Barren River in Warren County.

== Marriage and family ==
After becoming established, on December 17, 1818, Sharp at the age of 31 married Eliza T. Scott, the daughter of a physician who had served as an officer in the War of 1812. She was from Frankfort and above him in social standing. They had three children together. He moved the family to the state capital of Frankfort in 1820 for his political career.

== Political career ==
In 1809, Sharp was elected to represent Warren County in the Kentucky House of Representatives. During his tenure, he supported the legislature's election of Henry Clay to the U.S. Senate, the creation of a state lottery, and the creation of an academy in Barren County. He served on a number of committees, and for a time served as interim speaker of the house during the General Assembly's second session. He was re-elected in 1810 and 1811. During the 1811 session, Sharp worked with Ben Hardin to secure passage of a bill to ensure that state officers and attorneys at law would not be involved in dueling. He also opposed a measure allowing harsher treatment of slaves.

Sharp's political service was interrupted by the War of 1812. On September 18, 1812, he enlisted as a private in the Kentucky militia, serving under Lieutenant Colonel Young Ewing. Twelve days later, in a rapid rise even for the militia, he was promoted to major and made a part of Ewing's staff. Ewing's unit was put under the command of general Samuel Hopkins during his ineffective expedition against the Shawnee. In total, the expedition lasted forty-two days and never engaged the enemy. Sharp recognized the value of a record of military service in Kentucky politics, however; he was eventually promoted to the rank of colonel.

=== U.S. Representative ===
In 1812, Sharp was elected to the Thirteenth Congress as a member of the United States House of Representatives and took his seat at the age of 25, the minimum for election. Aligning with the War Hawks, he defended President James Madison's decision to lead the country into the war, and supported a proposal to offer 100 acres (0.156 sq mi; 0.405 km^{2}) of land to any British deserters. Sharp also "[passionately denounced] Federalist obstruction of the war effort". In a speech on April 8, 1813, he opposed indemnity for those defrauded in the Yazoo land scandal in Mississippi. He allied with South Carolina's John C. Calhoun in supporting the Second Bank of the United States.

Sharp was re-elected to the Fourteenth Congress, during which he served as chairman of the Committee on Private Land Claims. He supported the controversial Compensation Act of 1816 sponsored by fellow Kentuckian Richard Mentor Johnson. The measure, which paid Congressmen a flat salary instead of paying them on a daily basis for the days when they were in session, was unpopular with the voters of his district. When the next congressional session opened in December 1816, Sharp reversed his position and voted to repeal the law, but the damage was already done; he lost his seat in the House in the next election.

In 1817, Sharp was again elected to the Kentucky House of Representatives. During his term, he supported measures for internal improvements, but opposed the creation of a state health board and a proposal to open the state's vacant lands to the widows and orphans of soldiers killed in the War of 1812. Most notably, he supported the creation of 46 new banks in the state, and proposed a tax on the branches of the Bank of the United States in Lexington and Louisville.

=== Accusations of illegitimate child ===
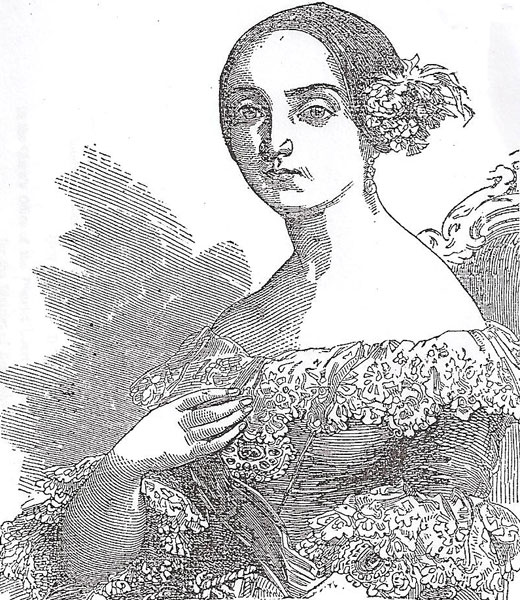
Etching of Anna Cooke

In May or June 1820, Anna Cooke, an unmarried planter's daughter in her early 30s, claimed that Sharp was the father of her illegitimate child; Sharp denied her claim. The stillborn child was rumored to have dark skin, and some speculated that it was a mulatto, with a black father. After her father's death and the sale of their plantation in Fairfax County, Virginia, Cooke had moved with her mother and siblings to Warren County between 1805 and 1810, when she may have met Sharp. In addition to losing the child, Cooke suffered the deaths of three of her five brothers between 1818 and 1821.

The scandal soon abated for Sharp, as Anna had a reputation as "a freethinker, reader of romantic fiction, and a libertine". Although Sharp's political opponents would continue to call attention to his putative child in future campaigns, his reputation remained largely untarnished.

=== Attorney general of Kentucky ===
In 1821, Sharp began a campaign for a seat in the Kentucky Senate. His opponent, attorney John U. Waring, was a notably violent and contentious man, frequently in court because of altercations. (In 1835, he shot and killed the attorney Samuel Q. Richardson).

Waring sent two threatening letters to Sharp, and on June 18, 1821, published a handbill attacking Sharp's character. Five days later, Sharp ceased campaigning for the senatorial seat. He accepted an appointment by Governor John Adair to the position of attorney general of Kentucky. Sharp's nomination was unanimously confirmed by the legislature on October 30, 1821.

Sharp took office at a critical time Kentucky's history. Still reeling from the financial Panic of 1819, state politicians had split into two camps: those who supported legislation favorable to debtors (the Debt Relief Party) and those who favored the protection of creditors (typically called Anti-Reliefers.) Sharp had identified with the Relief Party, as had Governor Adair.

In the 1824 presidential election, Sharp alienated some of his constituency by supporting his former House colleague John C. Calhoun instead of Kentucky's favorite son, Henry Clay. When it was clear that Calhoun's bid would fail, Sharp threw his support behind Andrew Jackson. He served as secretary of a meeting of Jackson supporters in Frankfort on October 2, 1824.

After Governor Adair's term expired in 1825, he was succeeded by another Relief Party member, General Joseph Desha. Desha and Sharp had been colleagues in Congress, and Desha re-appointed Sharp as attorney general. The Relief faction in the legislature passed several measures favorable to debtors, but the Kentucky Court of Appeals struck them down as unconstitutional. Unable to muster the votes to remove the hostile justices on the Court of Appeals, Relief partisans in the General Assembly passed legislation to abolish the entire court and create a new one, which Governor Desha promptly stocked with sympathetic judges. For a time, two courts claimed authority as Kentucky's court of last resort; this period was referred to as the Old Court-New Court controversy.

Sharp's role in the Relief Party's plan to abolish the old court and replace it with a new, more favorable court is not known. As he was the administration's chief legal counsel, historians believe he was closely involved. He is known to have issued the order for Old Court clerk Achilles Sneed to turn over his records to New Court clerk Francis P. Blair. By practicing as state attorney general before the New Court to the exclusion of the Old Court, Sharp provided it a measure of legitimacy.

=== State House of Representatives ===
On May 11, 1825, Sharp was chosen to represent the Desha administration in welcoming the Marquis de Lafayette, a hero of the American Revolution, to Kentucky. At a banquet in Lafayette's honor three days later, Sharp toasted the guest of honor: "The People: Liberty will always be safe in their holy keeping." Shortly following this event, Sharp resigned as attorney general, likely because Relief Party advocates thought he would be more useful as a member of the General Assembly.

The Anti-Relief partisans nominated former Senator John J. Crittenden for one of the two seats apportioned to Franklin County in the state House. The Relief Party countered with Sharp and Lewis Sanders, a prominent area lawyer. During the sharply contested campaign, both John U. Waring and Patrick Henry Darby, a land speculator, said that Sharp's life was at risk if he won. Opponents revived the charges of Sharp's illegitimate child. It was also alleged that Sharp had claimed that the child was mulatto and said he had a certificate from Cooke's midwife to that effect; whether Sharp made this claim may never be known for certain. Despite the controversy, Sharp netted the most votes in the election, winning by 69 out of a total of 1600 votes cast in the county.

== Murder and aftermath ==
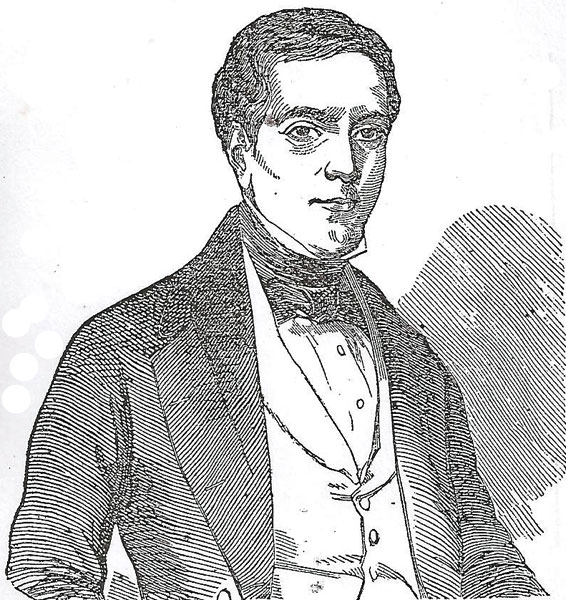
Jereboam O. Beauchamp was convicted of Sharp's murder.

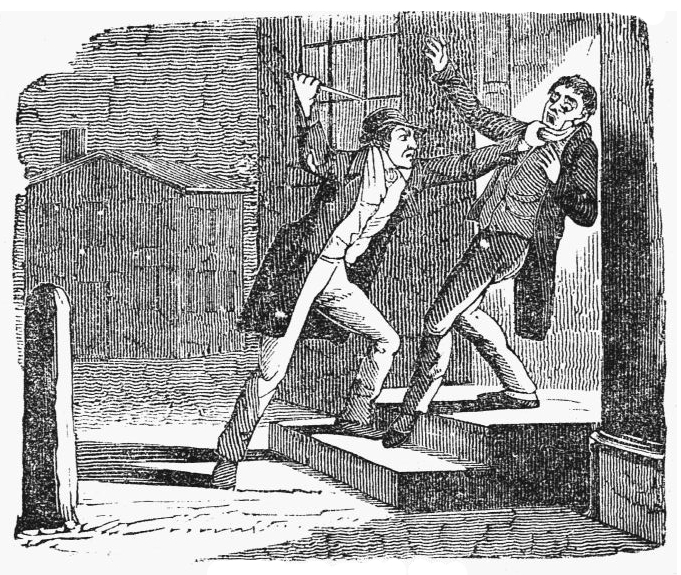
Jereboam O. Beauchamp stabs Sharp; illustration from The United States Criminal Calendar (1835)

In the early hours of November 7, 1825, the day the General Assembly was to open its session, a man knocked on the door of Sharp's residence. When Sharp answered the door, the visitor grabbed him with his left hand and used his right to stab him in the heart with a poisoned dagger. Sharp died at approximately two o'clock in the morning. After lying in state in the House of Representatives Hall, he was buried in Frankfort Cemetery.

Because of the bitterness of the campaign and the timing of the murder, speculation mounted that Sharp had been killed by an Anti-Relief partisan. For some time, rumors traveled that Darby was implicated in his death. Sharp's political rival, John J. Crittenden, tried to blunt such accusations by personally introducing a resolution condemning the murder and offering a $3000 reward for the capture of the assassin. The trustees of the city of Frankfort added a reward of $1000, and an additional $2000 reward was raised from private sources. In the 1825 session of the General Assembly, a measure to form Sharp County from Muhlenberg County died on the floor due to the tumultuous politics of the session.

In the investigation that followed, the evidence quickly pointed to Jereboam O. Beauchamp, 23, who had married the much older Anna Cooke in 1824. On November 11, 1825, a four-man posse arrested Beauchamp at his home in Franklin.

He was tried and convicted of Sharp's murder on May 19, 1826. His sentence – execution by hanging – was to be carried out on June 16, 1826. Beauchamp requested a stay of execution so that he could write a justification of his actions; he continued to assert his avenging his wife's honor. The request was granted, allowing Beauchamp to complete his book, The Confession of Jereboam O. Beauchamp: who was hanged at Frankfort, Ky., on the 7th day of July 1826, for the murder of Col. Solomon P. Sharp. After two suicide attempts with his wife, who died as a result of the second incident, Beauchamp was hanged for his crime on July 7, 1826. Beauchamp's Confession was published in 1826. Some editions included The Letters of Ann Cook as an appendix. Historians dispute whether Cooke was their author.

The following year, Sharp's brother, Dr. Leander Sharp, wrote Vindication of the Character of the Late Col. Solomon P. Sharp to defend him from the charges contained in Beauchamp's confession. In Vindication, Dr. Sharp portrayed the killing as a political assassination: he named Patrick Darby, a partisan of the Anti-Relief faction, as co-conspirator with Beauchamp, an Anti-Relief stalwart. Darby threatened to sue Sharp if he published his Vindication; and Waring threatened to kill him. Heeding these threats, Sharp did not publish his work; all extant manuscripts remained in his house, where they were discovered many years later during a remodeling.

== In popular culture ==
The events have inspired numerous works of fiction, drama and history:

- Charles Fenno Hoffman's novel, Greyslayer
- William Gilmore Simms's novel, Beauchamp
- Edgar Allan Poe's unfinished play, Politian
- J.G. Dana and R.S. Thomas's history, Beauchamp's Trial.
- L.F. Johnson included it in his Tragedies and Trials.
- 1950, J. Winston Coleman published a history of the events.
- 1950, Robert Penn Warren wrote a novel that was a "critique of romantic values" in World Enough and Time.
- Richard Taylor's play, Three Kentucky Tragedies, was based on this.
- 1992 John Hawkins created an outdoor drama on this subject, Wounded is the Wounding Heart, produced in Frankfort, Kentucky.

== See also ==
- List of assassinated American politicians

== Notes ==
U.S. House of Representatives
Preceded by Joseph Desha	Member of the U.S. House of Representatives from Kentucky's 6th congressional district 1813–1817	Succeeded by David Walker
Legal offices
Preceded by Ben Hardin	Attorney General of Kentucky; 1821–1825	Succeeded by Frederick Grayson
