= George Long Duyckinck =

American writer

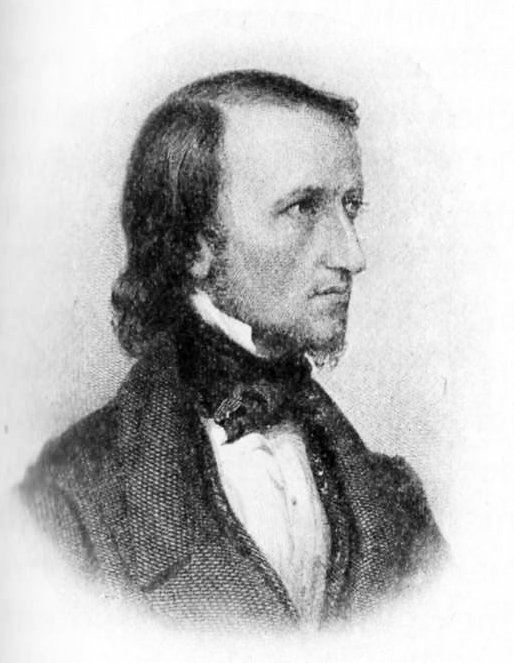
- Born: October 17, 1823; New York City
- Died: March 30, 1863 (aged 39); New York City
- Occupation: biographical writer

George Long Duyckinck (October 17, 1823 – March 30, 1863) was a New York City writer.

== Biography ==
He was born on October 17, 1823, in New York City; his sibling was Evert Augustus Duyckinck.

He attended Geneva College and then entered New York University, and graduated in 1843. He studied law and was admitted to the bar, but never practiced. After the completion of his legal studies he traveled extensively in Europe in 1847–1848, and on his return became joint editor with his brother Evert of The Literary World, afterward becoming joint author with his brother of the Cyclopaedia of American Literature. He then revisited Europe, and, on his return in 1857, entered on a separate career of authorship in a congenial department. During the 1850s, the Duyckinck brothers were the unofficial heads of the New York literary scene.

He was by early training and long-established choice warmly attached to the liturgy and order of the Protestant Episcopal Church, and especially interested in its biographical literature. To this he devoted himself, and, having been elected treasurer of the Sunday School union and Church book society, he began a series of biographies of English clergymen, with a view to attract the interest of American readers. The first of these was the "Life of George Herbert" (New York, 1858), followed by the lives of Bishop Thomas Ken (1859), Jeremy Taylor (1860), and Hugh Latimer (1861). These memoirs were condensed to a simple narrative; but they are regarded as contributions of high value. Duyckinck contemplated writing the life of Bishop Leighton, but before entering on its preparation he was seized with the illness that terminated his life.

He died on March 30, 1863.
