= Evert Augustus Duyckinck =

American journalist

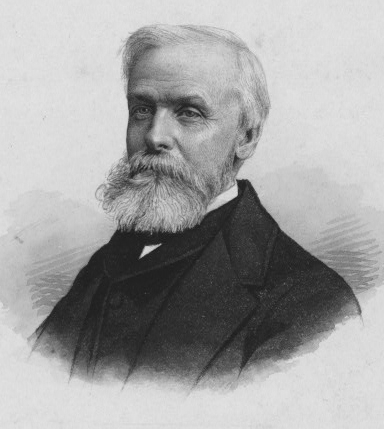
- Born: November 23, 1816; New York City, New York
- Died: August 13, 1878 (aged 61); New York City, New York
- Spouse: Margaret Wolfe Panton (m. 1840)
- Children: Evert Augustus Duyckinck II; George Duyckinck; Reverend Henry Duyckinck (1843-1870)
- Parent(s): Harriet June; Evert Duyckinck (1764?-1833)
- Relatives: George Long Duyckinck (1823-1863), brother

Evert Augustus Duyckinck (pronounced DIE-KINK) (November 23, 1816 – August 13, 1878) was an American publisher and biographer. He was associated with the literary side of the Young America movement in New York.

== Biography ==
He was born on November 23, 1816, in New York City to Evert Duyckinck, a publisher.

Evert the younger graduated from Columbia College, where he was a member of the Philolexian Society, in 1835. He then studied law with John Anthon, and was admitted to the bar in 1837. He spent the next year in Europe. Before he went abroad he wrote articles on the poet George Crabbe, the works of George Herbert, and Oliver Goldsmith, for the New York Review. In 1840 he started a monthly magazine with Cornelius Mathews called Arcturus, which ran until 1842. The New York Tribune commented on the important partnership by referring to Duyckinck and Mathews as "the Castor and Pollux of Literature—the Gemini of the literary Zodiac". Duyckinck wrote articles on other authors while at home and in Europe. Between 1844 and 1846, Evert became the literary editor of John L. O'Sullivan's The United States Magazine and Democratic Review, which moved from Washington, D.C., to New York in 1840.

On April 22, 1840, in Connecticut he married Margaret Wolfe Panton, and they had three children: Evert Augustus Duyckinck II, George Duyckinck, and Henry Duyckinck (1843-1870). All died young.

In 1845-46 he edited the book series "The Library of Choice Reading" and "The Library of American Books" for the Wiley & Putnam publishing house. In 1845, he assisted Edgar Allan Poe in printing his Tales collection and selected which stories to include. The collection was a critical success, though Poe was somewhat disappointed by Duyckinck's choices. In 1847 he became the editor of The Literary World, a weekly review of books written with his brother George Long Duyckinck until 1853. The two brothers became the unofficial leaders of the New York literary scene in the 1840s into the 1850s.

In 1854 the brothers were again united in the preparation of The Cyclopaedia of American Literature (2 vols., New York, 1855; enlarged eds., 1865 and 1875). He published Wit and Wisdom of Sydney Smith, with a memoir (New York, 1856); an American edition of Willroot's Poets of the Nineteenth Century (1858). Immediately after the death of Washington Irving, Duyckinck gathered together and published in one volume a collection of anecdotes and descriptions of traits of the author, under the title of Irvingiana (1859); History of the War for the Union (3 vols., 1861–65); Memorials of John Allan (1864); Poems relating to the American Revolution, with Memoirs of the Authors (1865); Poems of Philip Freneau, with notes and a memoir (1865); National Gallery of Eminent Americans (2 vols., 1866); History of the World from the Earliest Period to the Present Time (4 vols., 1870); and Portrait Gallery of Eminent Men and Women of Europe and America. Embracing History, Statesmanship, Naval and Military Life, Philosophy, the Drama, Science, Literature and Art. With Biographies (2 vols., 1873). His last literary work was the preparation, with William Cullen Bryant, of an edition of William Shakespeare.

He died on August 13, 1878, in New York City.

== Letter to Lincoln ==
On 18 February 1865, Duyckinck sent President Abraham Lincoln a letter, which he signed "Asmodeus", with his initials below his pseudonym. The letter enclosed a newspaper clipping about an inappropriate joke allegedly told by Lincoln at the Hampton Roads Peace Conference. The purpose of Duyckinck's letter was to advise Lincoln of "an important omission" about the history of the conference. He advised that the newspaper clipping be added to the "Archives of the Nation".

== Legacy and criticism ==
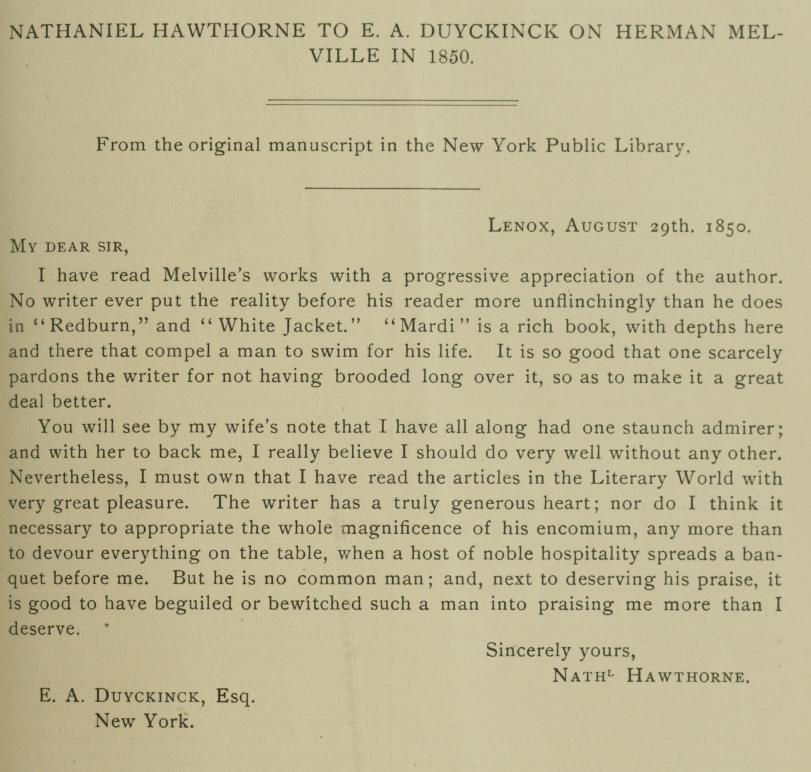
Letter from Nathaniel Hawthorne to Duyckinck regarding Melville

In January 1879, a meeting in his memory was held by the New York Historical Society, and a biographical sketch of Duyckinck was read by William Allen Butler.

Herman Melville, a close friend of Duyckinck's with whom he corresponded often, refers in his novel Mardi (1849) to Duyckinck's highbrow magazine Arcturus by naming a ship in the book Arcturion. Mardi's narrator "complained about the low literary level of its crew: 'Ay, ay, Arcturion! thou wast exceedingly dull'". Duyckinck also garnered a mention in James Russell Lowell's A Fable for Critics (1848) with the lines, "Good-day, Mr. Duyckinck, I am happy to meet / With a scholar so ripe and a critic so neat". Charles Frederick Briggs noted Duyckinck's ability in the "art of puffing", heavy praise for works that did not necessarily merit it. Edwin Percy Whipple chidingly called Duyckinck "the most Bostonian of New-Yorkers". William Allen Butler noted that Duckinck's taste in literature was too high for most readers: "While Duyckinck was the most genial of companions, and the most impartial of critics, he was too much of a recluse, buried in his books, almost solitary in life, and entirely removed from the circle of worldly and fashionable life".

== Honors and memberships ==
Elected a member of the American Antiquarian Society in 1855.

== New York Historical Society biographies ==
- Francis L. Hawks, D.D., LL, D. (1867; printed, 1871)
- Henry Theodore Tuckerman (1872)
- James William Beekman (1877)
- John Wolfe (1872) and
- Samuel G. Drake (1876)
