= The Poetic Principle =

Essay by Edgar Allan Poe on his literary theory

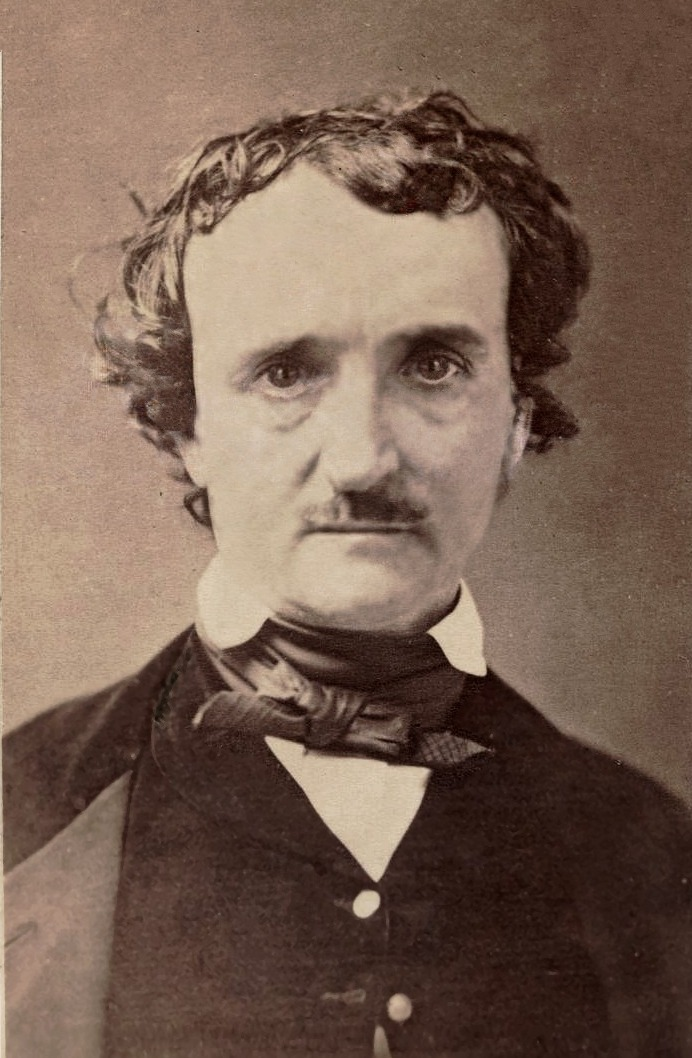

"The Poetic Principle" is an essay by Edgar Allan Poe, written near the end of his life and published posthumously in 1850, the year after his death. It is a work of literary criticism, in which Poe presents his literary theory. It is based on a series of lectures Poe had given late in his life.

== Synopsis ==
The essay argues that a poem should be written "for a poem's sake" and that the ultimate goal of art is aesthetic. He also argues against the concept of a long poem, saying that an epic, if it is to be worth anything, must instead be structured as a collection of shorter pieces, each of which is not too long to be read in a single sitting.

The essay critiques, sometimes rather sharply, the works of other poets of his time. His most common complaint is against didacticism, which he calls a "heresy", and allegory. He specifically targeted Henry Wadsworth Longfellow for his didacticism, something he would go on to call "the heresy of the didactic". According to Poe, Longfellow's poetry was preachy, derivative, and thematically plagiarized. This would later give birth to what was known as "The Longfellow War". Although Poe is referring to poetry here, it is believed that Poe's philosophy against didacticism extends to fiction.

== Origins ==
The essay was based on a lecture that Poe gave in Providence, Rhode Island at the Franklin Lyceum. The lecture reportedly drew an audience of 2,000 people.

Some Poe scholars have suggested that "The Poetic Principle" was inspired in part by the critical failure of his two early poems "Al Aaraaf" and "Tamerlane", after which he never wrote another long poem. From this experience, Poe surmised that long poems are unable to sustain a proper mood or maintain a high-quality poetic form and are, therefore, inherently flawed. Critics have suggested that this theory was written so that Poe could justify why "Al Aaraaf" and "Tamerlane" were unpopular.

== Publication history ==
"The Poetic Principle" was published in the Home Journal, in the series for 1850, no. 36, August 31, 1850, with an introductory note by Nathaniel Parker Willis.

== See also ==
- "The Philosophy of Composition"
- 1850 in poetry
