= Al Aaraaf =

Poem by Edgar Allan Poe

Illustration for "Al Aaraaf" by W. Heath Robinson

"Al Aaraaf" is an early poem by American writer Edgar Allan Poe, first published in 1829. It tells of the afterlife in a place called Al Aaraaf, inspired by A'raf as described in the Quran. At 422 lines, it is Poe's longest poem.

"Al Aaraaf", which Poe said he wrote before he was 15, was first published as the major poem in Poe's 1829 collection Al Aaraaf, Tamerlane, and Minor Poems. The book and "Al Aaraaf" in particular received mostly negative reviews for its complexity, obscure references, and odd structure. Some, however, noted the potential in the young poet, including author and critic John Neal, to whom Poe had shown "Al Aaraaf" prior to publication. Poe later referred to Neal's response as the first words of encouragement he had received. Nevertheless, the negative response to "Al Aaraaf" may have inspired Poe's later poetic theory that poems should be kept short.

Years later, in 1845, Poe used "Al Aaraaf" to hoax members of the Boston literary circle during a reading. Poe said the poem was a new one and his audience was perplexed by it. He later said a Boston crowd did not deserve a new poem. He held a strong dislike for New England poets and the New England–based Transcendental movement and hoped by presenting a poem he had written in his youth would prove Bostonians did not know good literature.

== Overview ==
"Al Aaraaf" is the longest poem Poe wrote and was inspired by Tycho Brahe's identification of a supernova in 1572 which was visible for about seventeen months. Poe identified the supernova with Al Aaraaf, a star that was the place between paradise and hell. Al Aaraaf (Arabic الأعراف, alternatively transliterated al-Aʻrāf) was a place where people who have been neither markedly good nor markedly bad had to stay until forgiven by God and let into Paradise, as discussed in Sura 7 of the Qur'an. As Poe explained to a potential publisher:

Its title is "Al Aaraaf" from the Al Aaraaf of the Arabians, a medium between Heaven and Hell where men suffer no punishment, but yet do not attain that tranquil & even happiness which they suppose to be the characteristics of heavenly enjoyment.

In the opening section of the poem, God commands Nesace, a name for Beauty's spirit, to convey a message to "other worlds". Nesace rouses the angel Ligeia and tells her to awaken the other thousand seraphs to perform God's work. Two souls, however, fail to respond: the "maiden-angel" Ianthe and her "seraph-lover" Angelo (Michelangelo), who describes his death on earth and the flight of his spirit to Al Aaraaf. Ianthe and Angelo are lovers, and their failure to do as Nesace commanded results in God not allowing them into heaven.

== Analysis ==
"Al Aaraaf" is thick with allusions and, because of this, is often avoided by scholars because, as writer Arthur Hobson Quinn notes, it can be "unintelligible". Nevertheless, Quinn says it possesses qualities which are important to understand the development of Poe's skills as a poet. "Al Aaraaf" mixes historical facts, religious mythology and elements of Poe's imagination. The poem primarily focuses on the afterlife, ideal love, and ideal beauty in relation to passion. The majority of the poem focuses on this reaching for ideal beauty and aesthetics. Characters in the poem serve as representative symbols of personified emotions. The goddess Nesace is beauty, Ligeia represents the music in nature, Ianthe and Angelo are creatures of passion.

The poem draws from Sura 7 (Arabic الأعراف) in the Quran; Poe also drew upon the Quran in other works, including "The Thousand-and-Second Tale of Scheherazade". In "Al Aaraaf", Poe was probably less interested in the Quran itself and more interested in an atmosphere of the exotic or otherworldliness. The true setting of the poem is a sort of dreamscape or alternative world. As critic Floyd Stovall wrote, the theme of the poem is "one of disillusionment with the world and escape into some more congenial realm of dream or of the imagination".

The star which prompted Poe to write "Al Aaraaf" was believed to foretell disaster or that humanity would be punished for breaking God's laws. Poe may have gotten the idea to base a poem on Brahe's astronomical discovery from poet John Keats's use of the 1781 discovery of the planet Uranus in a poem called "On First Looking into Chapman's Homer" (1816). The name of the star has been changed from "Al Orf" to "Al Aaraaf" to become similar to the word arafa, which means distinguishing between things. Additionally, Poe was indebted to Irish poet Thomas Moore, whose poem Lalla-Rookh inspired, among other parts of "Al Aaraaf", the catalogue of flowers near the beginning. Another work by Moore, The Loves of the Angels, inspired Poe's idea of uniting mortal and immortal love.

Structurally, the 422-line "Al Aaraaf" has no discernible or consistent poetic rhythm, though the meter resembles a section of Lord Byron's Manfred. Instead of formal structure, the poem focuses on the flow of sound. Poet Daniel Hoffman analyzed the fluctuating meter and determined that Part I begins as octosyllabic couplets then shifts to pentameter couplets with occasional interludes of alternately rhymed trimeter-dimeters. Part II generally uses pentameter couplets with an interlude of anapestic dimeters.

== Publication history ==
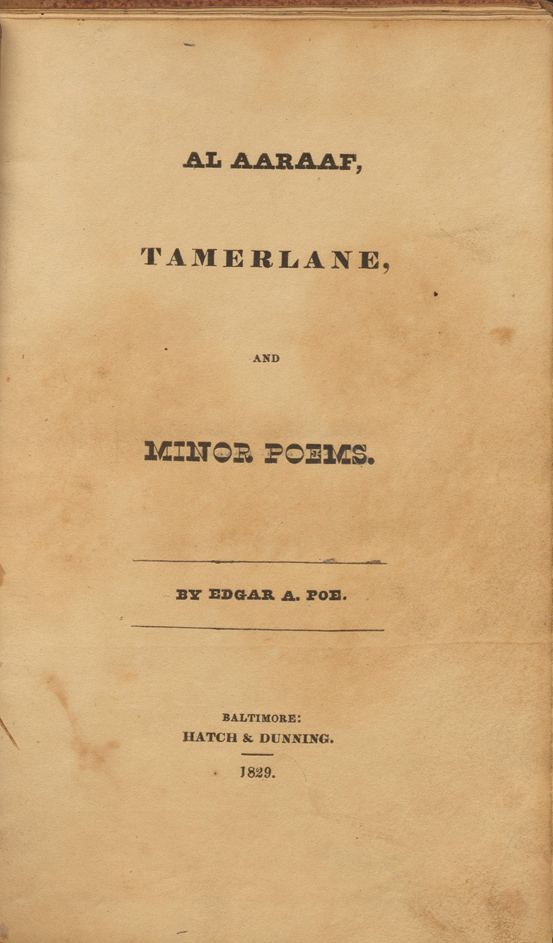
Al Aaraaf, Tamerlane, and Minor Poems (1829)

Poe claimed he wrote "Al Aaraaf" before he was 15 years old, though he would later adapt his claim. A few passages from the poem were first published in the May 19, 1829, issue of the Baltimore Gazette signed "Marlow". Poe first offered the complete poem to publishers Carey, Lea & Carey in Philadelphia around May 1829. He wrote to them, "If the poem is published, succeed or not, I am 'irrecoverably a poet.' But to your opinion I leave it". He met with Isaac Lea, who was willing to publish it so long as they were protected against any loss. Poe asked his foster-father John Allan to subsidize the printing but, not supportive of Poe's literary pursuits, he refused. By July 28, Poe wrote to the publishers asking for the return of his manuscript because, as he said, he had "made a better disposition of my poems than I had any right to expect".

"Al Aaraaf" finally saw print for the first time in the collection Al Aaraaf, Tamerlane, and Minor Poems. 250 copies of the 71-page work was issued by Hatch and Dunning of Baltimore, Maryland in December 1829. Though Poe had already self-published Tamerlane and Other Poems, he considered Al Aaraaf, Tamerlane, and Minor Poems his first book. Though this was not entirely true, it was the first work published with his name, signed "Edgar A. Poe". Poe addressed the obscurity in "Al Aaraaf" by including multiple footnotes, many of which were left untranslated from French, Latin, and Spanish. "Al Aaraaf" was published in its entirety only once in Poe's lifetime, though some critics believe Poe never actually completed the poem because Poe implied it was originally intended to have four parts or 400 lines.

== Critical response ==
Upon publication, "Al Aaraaf" and the other poems in Poe's collection drew harsh criticism because of how difficult it was to understand. Among the early reviewers was John Hill Hewitt, who wrote of Poe that "no man has been more shamefully overestimated". In trying to explain the title poem, he wrote, "all our brain-cudgeling could not compel us to understand it line by line or the sum total". A reviewer for the Baltimore Minerva and Emerald asked, "Has the poet been struck dumb with palsy?" Before publication, Poe had sought the advice of William Wirt, who had earned a reputation as a distinguished man of letters in Baltimore. On "Al Aaraaf", Wirt wrote that he was not the best judge of poetry but believed that it might be accepted by modern-thinking readers. As he wrote, "but to deal candidly... (as I am bound to do) I should doubt whether the poem will take with old-fashioned readers like myself". Sarah Josepha Hale of Godey's Lady's Book noted that "Al Aaraaf" must have been written by a young author because it was "boyish, feeble, and altogether deficient in the common characteristics of poetry". Nevertheless, she still called the author a genius. A reviewer for the American Ladies' Magazine also commented on the poet's age: "[the] author who appears to be very young, is evidently a fine genius, but he wants judgment, experience, tact".

Poe boasted that these early poems were superior to most other examples in American poetry. Critic John Neal, who was a friend of Poe's cousin George Poe, responded to Poe's claim in his review of "Al Aaraaf" for The Yankee and Boston Literary Gazette. He said Poe's boast was "rather exquisite nonsense" but that the young author showed promise and predicted that some day Poe might "make a beautiful and perhaps a magnificent poem" to prove his claim. He believed that if future poems by Poe were as good as some of his best lines in "Al Aaraaf":

He will deserve to stand high—very high—in the estimation of the shining brotherhood. Whether he will do so however, must depend, not so much upon his words now in mere poetry, as upon his worth hereafter in something yet loftier and more generous—we allude to the stronger properties of the mind, to the magnanimous determination that enables a youth to endure the present, whatever the present may be, in the hope, or rather in the belief, the fixed, unwavering belief, that in the future he will find his reward.

Neal's encouragement, which came prior to publication, led Poe to include a dedication to Neal in the collection Al Aaraaf, Tamerlane, and Minor Poems. Poe's cousin Neilson Poe was impressed by Neal's endorsement and wrote, "Our name will be a great one yet." Edgar Poe would refer to Neal's comments as "the very first words of encouragement I remember to have heard." Poe himself admitted that "Al Aaraaf" had some "good poetry" in it as well as "much extravagance, which I have not had time to throw away".

In the 20th century, poet Daniel Hoffman referred to "Al Aaraaf" as "Poe's most ambitious failure", suggesting it is a "fractured" attempt at an epic poem that "ran out of gas". Biographer Jeffrey Meyers called it Poe's "most turgid and opaque poem".

== Legacy ==
"Al Aaraaf" includes names Poe would later reuse: Ligeia and Zante. Some of the themes in the poem also foreshadow a future poem, "The City in the Sea" (1831). The critical failure of both "Al Aaraaf" and "Tamerlane" convinced Poe that long poems are inherently flawed because they cannot sustain a proper mood or a high quality poetic form. Because of this, he never again experimented with long poetry. He would later write of his theory on short poetry in "The Poetic Principle" in 1848. In that essay, he wrote "A long poem does not exist. I maintain that the phrase, 'a long poem,' is simply a flat contradiction in terms." Instead, he says, epic poetry and other long poems are actually a series of short poems strung together. Critics have suggested that this theory was written so that Poe could justify why "Al Aaraaf" was unpopular.

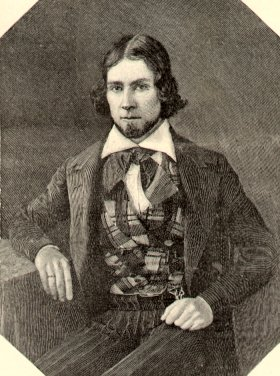
James Russell Lowell helped Poe arrange a public appearance in Boston in 1845. Instead of presenting a new poem, Poe read "Al Aaraaf".

After the publication of "The Raven" in 1845, Poe became a household name and, having reached the height of his poetic fame, he was often asked to lecture or recite poetry at public events. One such invitation came from the Boston Lyceum in October 1845, arranged with help from James Russell Lowell. Poe had a strong dislike for the Boston literary scene and the city itself, despite having been born there. Nevertheless, he accepted the $50 fee and the challenge of writing a brand new poem for his appearance.

Fresh off his public feud with Henry Wadsworth Longfellow and his dislike of the Massachusetts-based Transcendentalism movement, Poe instead decided to play a trick on his Boston audience. The program, held October 16 at Boston's Odeon Theater, was a grand event and featured a speech by Massachusetts statesman Caleb Cushing which was two and a half hours long. Poe read "Al Aaraaf", renamed "The Messenger Star" for the event, and tried to convince his Boston audience that the poem he wrote as a young man was new. The audience was confused by the obscure poem and many left during its recitation. Poe ended with "The Raven", as the theater manager noted, "thus enabling us to make some show of front after a most lamentable defeat."

Poe considered the hoax an opportunity to prove that Bostonians did not know good literature. Based on critical reaction, he believed he was right. The editor of the Boston Courier reviewed "The Messenger Star" as "an elegant and classic production, based on the right principles, containing the essence of true poetry, mingled with a gorgeous imagination". When Poe claimed that he wrote the poem before he had turned 12, Cornelia Wells Walter of the Boston Evening Transcript wrote of her shock: "A poem delivered before a literary association of adults, as written by a boy! Only think of it!" It is unclear how old Poe was at the time he wrote the poem because, in part, he frequently changed his claim. Lewis Gaylord Clark said Poe's age at writing the poem was irrelevant and, though he admitted the audience did not know the author's age, "they only knew it was sad stuff". Modern biographer Daniel Stashower compared Poe's stunt with the story "The Imp of the Perverse", in which Poe wrote about "an earnest desire to tantalize a listener... The speaker is aware that he displeases."

Upon his return to New York, Poe wrote in the Broadway Journal his view of the event. After noting that he refused to offer a didactic poem, he wrote:

It could scarcely be supposed that we would put ourselves to the trouble of composing for the Bostonians anything in the shape of an original poem... We do not, ourselves, think the poem a remarkably good one:—it is not sufficiently transcendental. Still it did well enough for the Boston audience—who evinced characteristic discrimination in understanding, and especially applauding, all those knotty passages which we ourselves have not yet been able to understand... If we cared a fig for their wrath we should not first have insulted them to their teeth, and then subjected to their tender mercies a volume of our Poems.

"Al Aaraaf" was used between 1928 and 1952 as a pen name by Glasgow artist Hannah Frank.
