= Nesace =

Character from poem

Illustration of Nesace for "Al Aaraaf" by W. Heath Robinson

Nesace (/niːˈsɑːki/, Italian pronunciation: [neˈzaːtʃe]; from Greek Νησάκη, Nēsakē 'small island') is one of the more prominent characters featured in Edgar Allan Poe's early epic poem Al Aaraaf, which came out in 1829 in the poetry anthology Al Aaraaf, Tamerlane and Minor Poems. Together with Tamerlane, Al Aaraaf is Poe's most extensive poem. It received mostly negative reviews for its complexity, obscure references, and odd structure.

== Description ==
Nesace is the ruler of the "anchored realm" that is Al Aaraaf, a Purgatory of sorts set between Heaven and Hell. She receives little to no description within the poem - she is said to have "angel limbs", a "gentle waist" and "golden hair". Common interpretation has her as being the embodiment of Beauty, a common theme in Poe's works.

== Role in Al Aaraaf ==
After pacing around the gardens of Al Aaraaf, Nesace is contacted by God in the first part of the poem and is asked to rally the inhabitants of the place so that they will be admitted in Heaven. The second part of the poem has Nesace rising the angel Ligeia, and through her rousing the many Seraphs and other angelical creatures that dwell in Al Aaraaf. Two of them - Angelo and Ianthe - fail to respond to Ligeia's calling, which results in their remaining in Al Aaraaf.
