= The Stylus =

Would-be periodical owned and edited by Edgar Allan Poe

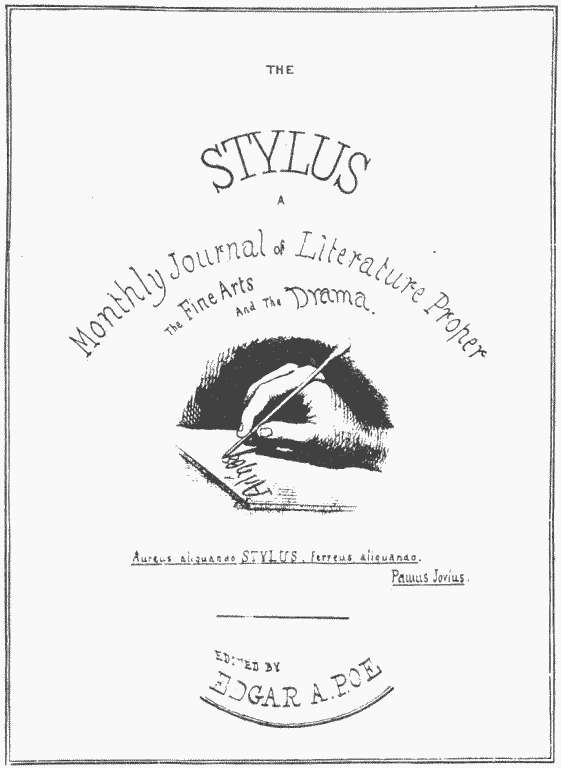
Poe's design for the cover of The Stylus

The Stylus, originally intended to be named The Penn, was a would-be periodical owned and edited by Edgar Allan Poe. It had long been a dream of Poe to establish an American journal with very high standards in order to elevate the literature of the time. Despite attempts at signing up subscribers and finding financial backers and contributors, the journal never came to be.

== Overview ==
Though Poe thought of creating the journal as early as 1834, he first announced his prospectus in June 1840 immediately after leaving Burton's Gentleman's Magazine. Originally, Poe intended to call the journal The Penn, as it would have been based in Philadelphia, Pennsylvania. In the June 6, 1840, issue of Philadelphia's Saturday Evening Post, Poe purchased advertising space for his prospectus: "PROSPECTUS OF THE PENN MAGAZINE, a Monthly Literary Journal, to be Edited and Published in the city of Philadelphia, by Edgar A. Poe." Many were looking forward to the magazine, including Connecticut-born journalist Jesse Erskine Dow, editor of the Index, who wrote: "We trust that he will soon come out with his Penn Magazine, a work which, if carried out as he designs it, will do away with the monopoly of puffing and break the fetters which a corps of pensioned blockheads have bound so long around the brows of young intellects who are too proud to pay a literary pimp for a favorable notice in a mammoth six penny or a good word with the fathers of the Row, who drink wine out of the skulls of authors and grow fat upon the geese that feed upon the grass that waves over their early tomb stones".

Poe soon realized he needed to "endeavor to support the general interests of the republic of letters, without reference to particular regions — regarding the world at large as the true audience of the author". Georgia poet Thomas Holley Chivers claimed he suggested it to Poe. It was renamed The Stylus, a pun on the word "Penn" ("pen") and specifically "the Pen with which the Greeks used to write".

F. O. C. Darley signed a contract on January 31, 1843, to create original illustrations for The Stylus. The contract requested at least three illustrations per month, "on wood or paper as required," but no more than five. Darley would have earned $7 per illustration. The contract was through July 1, 1844. Shortly after this contract was put in place, Darley illustrated Poe's tale "The Gold-Bug". On February 25, 1843, another announcement for The Stylus was made which took up an entire page. In it, Poe's status as a poet was emphasized and it included the first published image of Poe; Poe wrote of it, "I am ugly enough God knows, but not quite so bad as that."

In a letter to James Russell Lowell dated March 30, 1844, Poe outlined the kind of journal America needed:

How dreadful is the present condition of our Literature! To what are things heading? We want... a well-founded Monthly Journal, of sufficient ability, circulation and character, to control, and to give tone to, our Letters. It should be, externally, a specimen of high, but not too refined Taste:-I mean, it should be boldly printed, on excellent paper, in single column, and be illustrated, not merely embellished, by spirited wood designs in the style of Grandville. Its chief aims should be Independence, Truth, Originality. It should be a journal of some 120 pp. and furnished at $5. It should have nothing to do with Agents or Agencies. Such a Magazine might be made to exercise a prodigious influence, and would be a source of wealth to its proprietors.

Poe wrote a letter to his cousin Neilson Poe on August 8, 1845, in which he stated very confidently, "In January I shall establish a Magazine." Even so, he never saw his dream come true despite having several published solicitations for subscribers. He came close, however, when he became the owner and editor of the Broadway Journal in October 1845. It ceased publication shortly thereafter when its final edition appeared on January 3, 1846. In a letter to Sarah Josepha Hale in January 1846, Poe wrote that, "The B. Journal had fulfilled its destiny... I had never regarded it as more than a temporary adjunct to other design."

That great design, Poe said, was to continue his plans for the establishment of his own magazine. By August 1846, he called The Stylus "the one great purpose of my literary life." He prophetically added, "Undoubtedly (unless I die) I will accomplish it."

== Fundraising ==
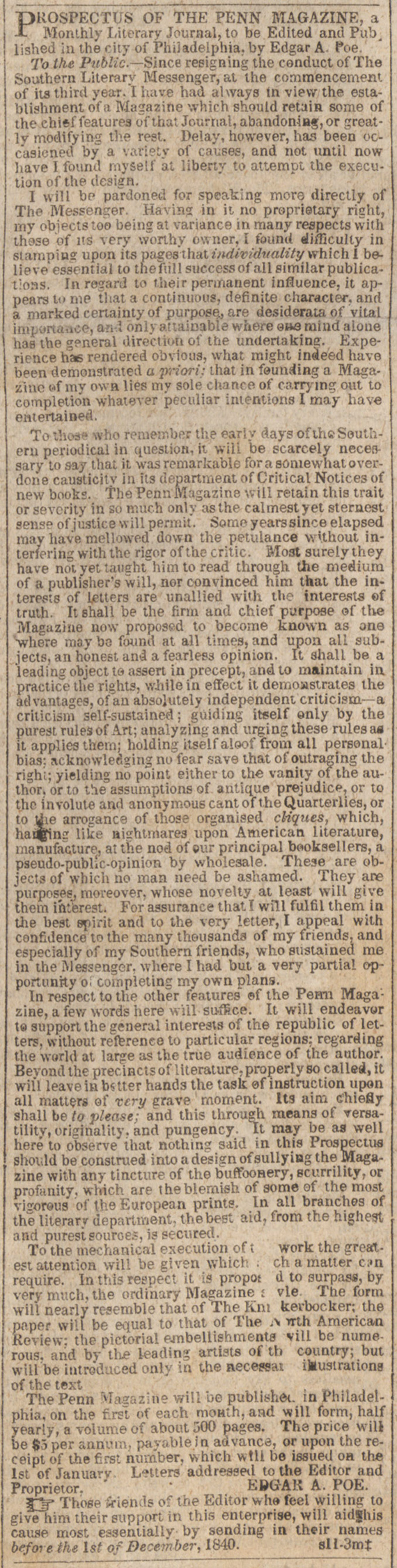
October 1840 advertisement for The Penn magazine, soon to be renamed The Stylus.

Poe was not able to support the founding of his magazine out of pocket, in part because of the after-effects of the Panic of 1837, and sought out investors. On January 17, 1840, Poe wrote a letter to friend and fellow writer John Pendleton Kennedy asking for his help in funding the magazine: "Since you gave me my first start in the literary world... you will not feel surprised that I look anxiously to you for encouragement in this new enterprise", he wrote. George Rex Graham offered financial support and hired Poe as an editor for his magazine, suggesting he would help with The Penn after six months. After Poe began work on Graham's Magazine, Graham published an announcement in the Saturday Evening Post that The Penn was to be "suspended".

Another possible financial backer was fellow poet Thomas Holley Chivers, a wealthy friend of Poe who would later defend Poe's posthumous reputation. Chivers at the time believed Poe was under-appreciated, especially for his work with Graham's Magazine, but was concerned with his harsh literary criticism. Chivers may also have been offered the position of co-editor. He turned down the proposition because of the distraction caused by the death of his three-year-old daughter.

In early 1843, Poe contacted Thomas C. Clarke, publisher of Philadelphia's Saturday Museum. A contract was signed on January 31, 1843, with the agreement that the first issue would be issued on July 1. They considered purchasing the subscription list of the Southern Literary Messenger around February. By May of that year, Clarke withdrew his support in part because of difficulties with his own magazine and in part because of concerns over Poe's drinking.

In February 1848, Poe presented a lecture titled "On The Cosmography of the Universe" (later printed as Eureka: A Prose Poem) at the Society Library in New York. Poe had hoped the profits from the lecture would raise significant funds for The Stylus. He had expected an audience of hundreds; only 60 people attended and, of those, most were confused by the topic. One newspaper reviewed the lecture very favorably and acknowledged its importance as a fund raiser:

We understand that the purpose of Poe's lectures is to raise the necessary capital for the establishment of a magazine, which he proposes to call "The Stylus." They who like literature without trammels, and criticism without gloves, should sent in their names forthwith as subscribers. If there be in the world a born anatomist of thought, it is Mr. Poe... The severe difficulties with which Mr. Poe has been visited within the last year, have left him in a position to devote himself, self-sacrificingly, to his new task... he will doubtless give it that most complete attention which alone can make such an enterprise successful.

Poe had a fair amount of support for The Stylus in the literary world. William Gilmore Simms wrote in June 1843, "Mr. Poe is well calculated to conduct a literary magazine. He is acknowledged as one of our best writers and critics." Several people and organizations subscribed to the journal before Poe's death. A list of potential subscribers he kept included Nathan C. Brooks, William Cullen Bryant, Sarah Josepha Hale, Charles Fenno Hoffman, John Pendleton Kennedy, George Lippard, James Russell Lowell, Anna Cora Mowatt, Frances Sargent Osgood, James Kirke Paulding, Thomas Mayne Reid, Jeremiah N. Reynolds, and Nathaniel Parker Willis. Several student societies also were interested in subscribing, including ones located at Dickinson College, Hampden-Sydney College, Jefferson College, Lafayette College, Marshall College, St. John's College, and St. Mary's College of Maryland.

== Contents ==
Poe had lofty plans for the make-up of the magazine. He was planning on setting standards very high, anticipating finer quality paper, superior woodcuts, sharper criticism, and bolder original fiction. These higher standards would be reflected in a higher than usual annual subscription price of $5. Early in its planning stages, he promised financial backers that he would start with 500 subscribers - a number which he expected to be 5,000 before the end of its second year. "There is no earthly reason why," he said, "such a Magazine may not, eventually, reach a circulation as great as that of Graham's at present - viz 50,000". He also anticipated having correspondents in Berlin and Paris. James Russell Lowell offered a poem and also convinced Nathaniel Hawthorne to contribute a short story to the first issue in 1843.
