= George Rex Graham =

American magazine editor and publisher (1813-1894)

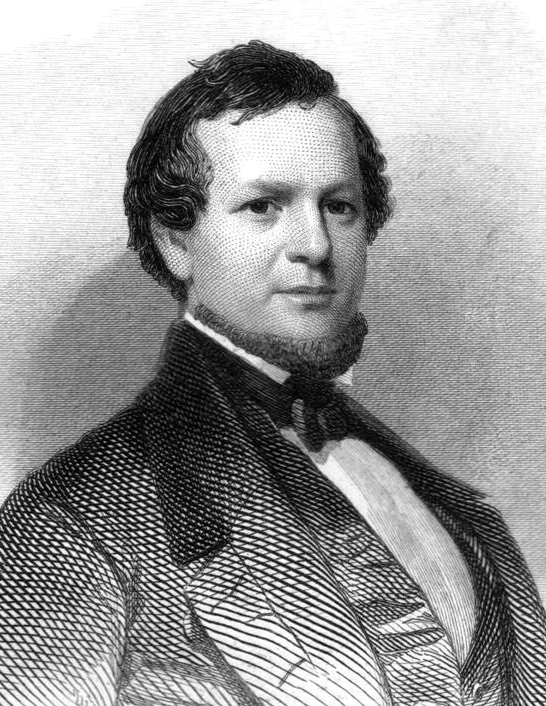
- Born: January 18, 1813
- Died: July 13, 1894 (aged 81); Orange, New Jersey
- Resting place: Laurel Hill Cemetery, Philadelphia, Pennsylvania, US
- Occupations: Editor, publisher

George Rex Graham (January 18, 1813 – July 13, 1894) was an American magazine editor and publisher from Philadelphia, Pennsylvania. He founded the journal Graham's Magazine at the age of 27 after buying Burton's Gentleman's Magazine and Atkinson's Casket. His journal became very popular and it was known for its generous payment to contributors.

Graham worked with many notable literary figures including Edgar Allan Poe and Rufus Wilmot Griswold, and possibly sparked the enmity between the two. After Poe's death, Graham defended him from Griswold's accusations and character assassination.

== Life and work ==
Graham was born on January 18, 1813; his father was a shipping merchant who had lost much of his money early in the 19th century. Graham was raised by his namesake and maternal uncle, George Rex, a farmer from Montgomery County, Pennsylvania. At age 19, Graham became an apprentice for a cabinet-maker before deciding to study law. After being admitted to the bar in 1839, Graham became interested in publishing at a time when Philadelphia was equal with New York City as a leader of the book and periodical publishing industry in America.

=== Publishing career ===
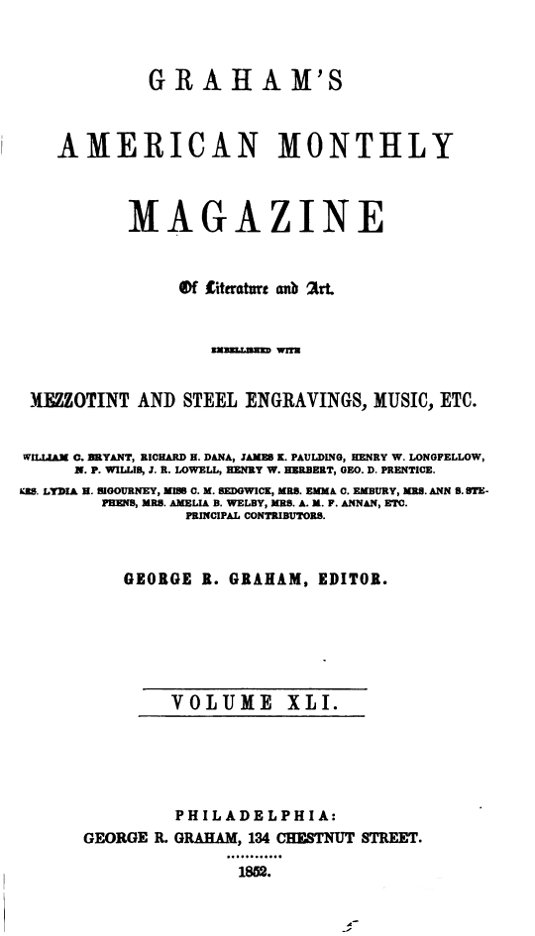
Title page from an 1852 issue of Graham's Magazine

Graham first began his publishing work with an editorial position with the Saturday Evening Post and later became the proprietor of Atkinson's Casket. At the age of 27, Graham combined the fledgling publication with Burton's Gentleman's Magazine in December 1840. The acquired publication had 3,500 subscribers, bringing his total list to 5,000. In its first year, that number jumped to 25,000. Success was partially owed by Graham's willingness to include brand new engravings and illustrations at a time when most monthly publications were re-using old plates from other magazines. He also paid his freelance writers very well. In fact, in later years, a "Graham page" was the new standard of payment for magazine work.

Edgar Allan Poe was hired as an editor and writer in February 1841. Graham agreed to help Poe with his planned journal The Penn if Poe worked for him for six months. By all accounts, Poe and Graham got along very well and had a good working relationship. Poe was paid $800 per year while Graham boasted $25,000 in profits. Poe originally called this salary "liberal" but later referred to it as "nambypamby" when compared to Graham's profits. Graham's Magazine was the first to publish many of Poe's works, including "The Murders in the Rue Morgue" and "The Colloquy of Monos and Una". Poe left the magazine in April 1842.

Graham would hire Rufus Wilmot Griswold, Poe's rival, as his next editor. Griswold was paid a salary of $1000 per year, more than he had paid Poe, lending some additional venom to the animosity between the two men. To his credit, Griswold was able to contract with Henry Wadsworth Longfellow to write for Graham's exclusively for a time.

Allegedly, Poe had offered first publication of "The Raven" to Graham, who refused. He may have given $15 to Poe as a friendly charity, but did not like the poem. Graham made it up to Poe a short while later by publishing the essay "The Philosophy of Composition" in which Poe tells of his inspiration for his famous poem and the technique of writing well.

After Poe's death, Graham defended him against critics like Griswold. In March 1850, he published in his magazine "Defense of Poe" and, four years later in February 1854, "The Genius and Characteristics of the Late Edgar Allan Poe."

Graham and his magazine worked with many other notable authors including William Cullen Bryant, James Fenimore Cooper, Nathaniel Hawthorne, James Russell Lowell and others.

Graham invested in copper, a decision that left him in severe financial difficulty. In 1848, he sold his magazine to Samuel Dewee Patterson, though he retained the title of editor. A year later, artist John Sartain, whose engravings had become a major selling point of Graham's, left to found his own journal, Sartain's Union Magazine. By 1850, Graham was able to buy back his interest in Graham's Magazine with the help of friends who sympathized with his financial woes. However, competition with Harper's New Monthly Magazine caused significant drops in subscriptions, as did the lack of an international copyright. Charles Godfrey Leland took over when Graham left the magazine in 1853 or 1854 and Graham's Magazine ceased publication in 1858.

=== Later life and death ===
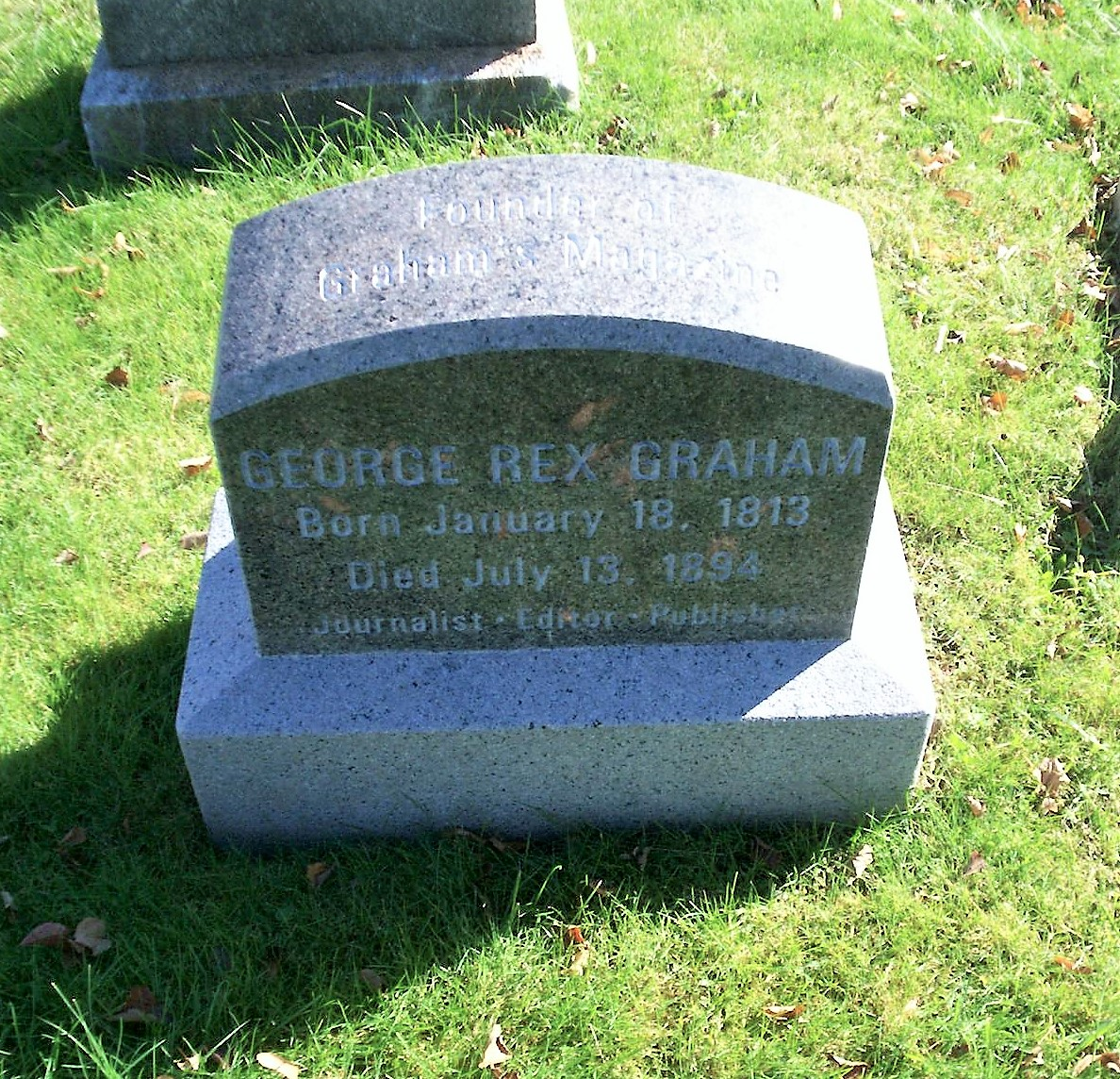
George Rex Graham grave in Laurel Hill Cemetery

At the age of 70, Graham lost his eyesight though it was partially restored in an operation. He was assisted financially by George William Childs before dying on July 13, 1894, at a hospital in Orange, New Jersey. He was interred at Laurel Hill Cemetery in Philadelphia.

== Sources ==
- Oberholtzer, Ellis Paxson (1906). The Literary History of Philadelphia. George W. Jacobs & Co.
- Silverman, Kenneth (1991). Edgar A. Poe: Mournful and Never-ending Remembrance. Harper Collins. ISBN 9780060167158.
