= Tamerlane and Other Poems =

1827 book by Edgar Allan Poe

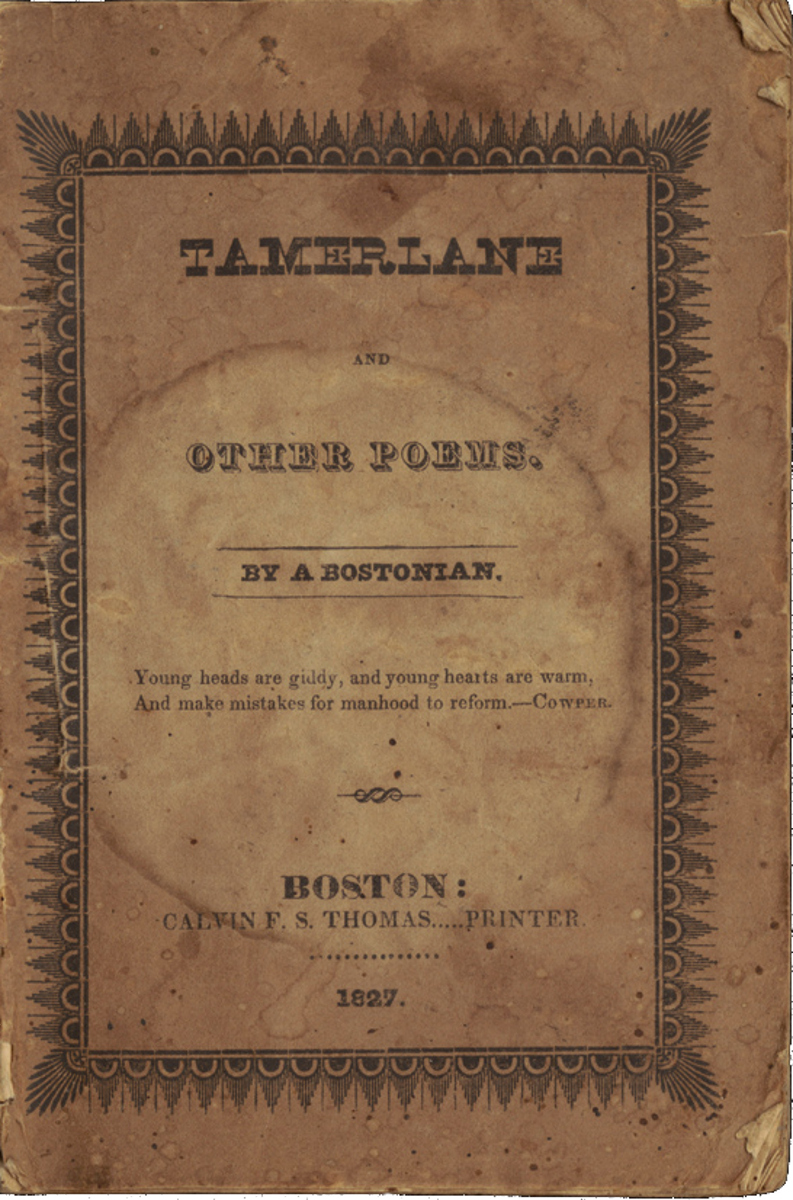
- Cover, original printing
- Author: Edgar Allan Poe
- Language: English
- Genre: Poetry collection
- Publisher: Calvin F. S. Thomas
- Publication date: July 1827
- Publication place: United States
- Media type: Print
- Pages: 40
- Text: Tamerlane and Other Poems at Wikisource

Tamerlane and Other Poems is the first published work by American writer Edgar Allan Poe. The short collection of poems was first published in 1827. Today, it is believed only 12 copies of the collection still exist.

Poe abandoned his foster family, the Allans, and moved to Boston to find work in 1827. Having only minor success, he enlisted in the United States Army. He brought with him several manuscripts, which he paid a printer named Calvin F. S. Thomas to publish. The 40-page collection was called Tamerlane and Other Poems and did not include Poe's name. Distribution was limited to 50 copies and it received no critical attention. The poems were largely inspired by Lord Byron, including the long title poem "Tamerlane", which depicts a historical conqueror who laments the loss of his first romance. Like much of Poe's future work, the poems in Tamerlane and Other Poems include themes of love, death, and pride.

Poe's first published collection is so rare that after Poe's death, the editor and critic Rufus Wilmot Griswold believed it had never existed. The first identified copy was not found until 1859. It has since been recognized as one of the rarest first editions in American literature.

== Background ==
Edgar Poe was unable to complete studies at the University of Virginia due to gambling debts. He left the university in March 1827 and the already-strained relationship with his foster father, John Allan, grew worse. Poe determined to go to Boston, where he was born. When Poe's biological mother Eliza Poe died, the only object she left him was a watercolor painting of the city, on the back of which she had written, "For my little son Edgar, who should ever love Boston, the place of his birth, and where his mother found her best and most sympathetic friends." John Allan, a merchant in Richmond, Virginia, refused to give his foster son the $12 for the trip, though it is likely Poe got the money from his foster mother Frances Allan. John Allan was not aware of Poe's decision or whereabouts and, not concerned, wrote "I'm thinking Edgar has gone to Sea to seek his own fortunes". After arriving in Boston in April 1827, Poe served briefly as clerk for a wholesale merchandise warehouse on the waterfront, then as an office clerk and reporter for an obscure newspaper, the Weekly Report. After several weeks, in desperation, he enlisted in the United States Army for a five-year term under the pseudonym "Edgar A. Perry"; he gave his age as 22, though he was only 18, likely because he would have needed parental consent if under 21. He was assigned to the First Regiment of Artillery and stationed at Boston Harbor's Fort Independence.

Up to this point, Poe had not written much poetry. His earliest lines of verse were a couplet labeled "Poetry", presumably written sometime in 1824 in the ledger book of Allan & Ellis, his foster father's mercantile company. The lines read: "Last night with many cares & toils oppress'd / Weary, I laid me on a couch to rest—". The earliest known full-length poem by Poe, "O, Tempora! O, Mores!", is a satirical poem whose authorship is the subject of some dispute. Nevertheless, calling himself "irrecoverably a poet", he had been working on a few longer poems at the University of Virginia, whose manuscripts he brought with him to Boston.

== Publication history ==
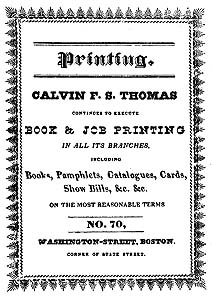
Back cover with an advertisement for printer Calvin F. S. Thomas

Sometime in the spring of 1827, Poe turned over his manuscripts to an 18-year-old printer named Calvin F. S. Thomas, whose family may have been known by Poe's birth parents. Thomas had previously only printed labels, flyers, and other small jobs. Poe used his own money to pay for the publication of his poems as the 40-page collection Tamerlane and Other Poems, the only known book printed by Thomas. The collection was pamphlet-sized, 6.75 by 4.5 inches. Poe was 18 years old when the collection was released in July 1827 and only 50 copies were printed. The total production number is the subject of dispute; various scholars believe the number was slightly lower (only 20 copies) or substantially higher (as many as 200).

Tamerlane and Other Poems was published anonymously with the credit granted to "a Bostonian". His name, typically listed as "Edgar A. Poe", was not published with his work until his second collection, Al Aaraaf, Tamerlane, and Minor Poems in late 1829. Poe may have chosen not to give his name so that his foster father, John Allan, would not know where he was; moreover, his choice to embrace his Bostonian heritage may have been an attempt to distance himself from the Allan family in Richmond. Boston was, at the time, a center for publishing and the literary world. By the time the book was released, Poe was already in the Army.

Poe introduced the collection with an apologetic notice admitting the low quality of his poems. He said they were not intended ever to be published and "why they are now published concerns no one" but the author. He claimed, however, that the majority of the poems were written between 1820 and 1821, "when the author had not completed his fourteenth year" though this is assumed to be an exaggeration. Poe used the low circulation of this collection to attract readers later in his career, suggesting the 1827 poetry book had been "suppressed through circumstances of a private nature". That second collection, Al Aaraaf, Tamerlane, and Minor Poems, included revised versions of five of the nine poems from Tamerlane and Other Poems.

Distribution of Tamerlane and Other Poems was so light that Rufus Wilmot Griswold in 1850 claimed it had never existed, noting that none had been found. The first known copy turned up in 1859 with a second found in 1874. A type facsimile of a copy held by the British Museum, edited and introduced by Richard Herne Shepherd, was published as a limited edition in 1884. Another copy of Tamerlane and Other Poems was published in a 1941 facsimile by Thomas Ollive Mabbott, who provided the introduction; his correction and additions to this are found in a subsequent publication. A further copy was found in 1988 by a Massachusetts man rummaging around in a bin at an antiques barn in New Hampshire.

It is believed only a dozen copies of the original printing of Tamerlane and Other Poems remain, making it one of the rarest of first editions in American literature. Ironically, the value of one copy today is more money than Poe ever made in his lifetime. Its rarity was recognized in 1925, when the Saturday Evening Post ran an article titled "Have You A Tamerlane in Your Attic"? After the article ran, a woman in Worcester, Massachusetts named Ada S. Dodd searched and found a copy, prompting others to search as well. Today, most of the surviving copies are owned by libraries and museums. Two copies, for example, were purchased by The Huntington Library in New York in 1915. One copy is on display as part of the collection at the Edgar Allan Poe Museum in Richmond, Virginia. Though copies do not circulate often, they command high prices when they do. One sold at auction for $125,000 and, later, another sold for $198,000. In December 2009, a copy from the William E. Self collection sold at Christie's, New York for $662,500, a record price paid for a work of American literature.

== Themes ==
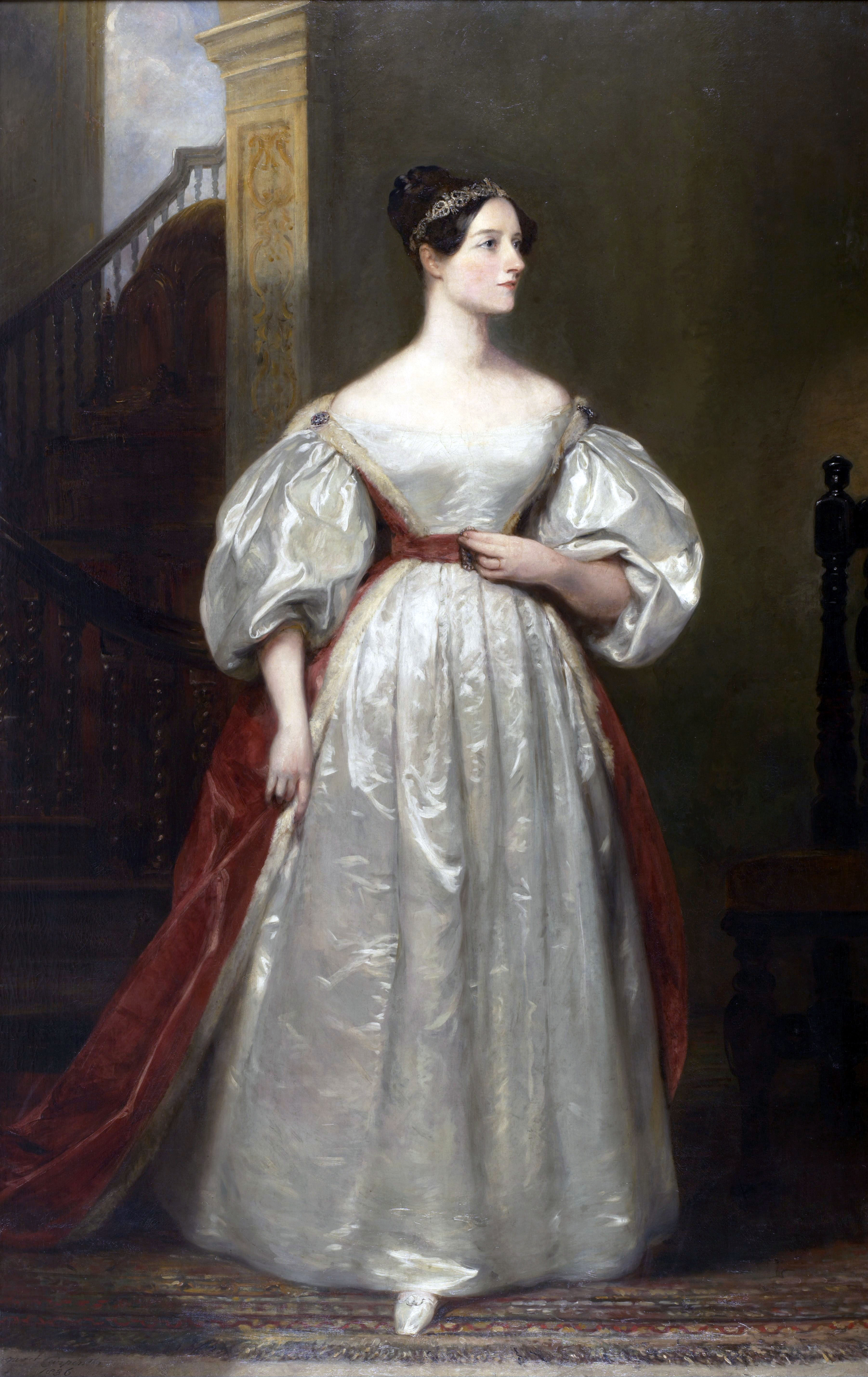
Many of the poems in Tamerlane and Other Poems were inspired by Lord Byron. A character in the title poem was named Ada after Byron's daughter Ada Lovelace.

The poems, many of which had a theme of youth, were inspired in part by the works of Percy Bysshe Shelley, and Samuel Taylor Coleridge. The largest inspiration on Poe, however, came from the work of Lord Byron; the character of the title poem "Tamerlane" has a daughter named "Ada", named after Byron's own daughter Ada Lovelace. Poe admired Byron both for his poetry and for his rebellious personality. John Allan blamed Poe's interest in Byron for his licentiousness. Some biographers suggest that Poe's wandering to Boston and joining the Army represent a need to live like an outcast inspired by Byron.

The title poem, "Tamerlane", depicts a dying conqueror who regrets leaving his childhood sweetheart and his home to pursue his ambitions. In its original form, "Tamerlane", based on the historical Timur, was 406 lines. The choice of an eastern character was unusual for a westerner at the time, though Byron, François-René de Chateaubriand, Thomas Moore and others had written other Orientalist works. Autobiographical overtones suggest Poe based the poem on the loss of his own early love, Sarah Elmira Royster, or of his birth mother Eliza Poe. The poem may also mirror Poe's relationship with his foster father John Allan; similar to Poe, Tamerlane is of uncertain parentage, with a "feigned name".

The "other poems", which Poe admitted "perhaps savour too much of egotism; but they were written by one too young to have any knowledge of the world but from his own breast". These poems present the poet as solitary figure who was faced some unnamed transforming childhood event. Poe adopted some of the common themes of the day, including imagery of heavenly bliss and angelic beauty. He steps away from the typical use of didacticism of the time and instead focuses on psychological reverie and symbolist aesthetics, beginning his lifelong poetic refusal to write for the masses. Poe would continue to revisit themes of death, beauty, love, and pride in his later works. He would later rewrite one poem, "Imitation", as "A Dream Within a Dream" and use images from "Evening Star" in "Ulalume".

== Critical reception ==
Tamerlane and Other Poems was virtually ignored and received no significant critical attention upon its publication. The only public notice of it was a mention of the title in a couple lists of recent books: The United States Review and Literary Gazette listed it in August and the North American Review listed it in October 1827. Samuel Kettell listed Tamerlane and Other Poems in his "Catalogue of American Poetry" section of his three-volume anthology Specimens of American Poetry in 1829. Literary historian Joel Porte suggests the American reading public during this period was more interested in fiction than poetry. Despite its lack of attention, the publication of Tamerlane and Other Poems gave a young Poe the confidence to continue writing.

After Poe became more popular with "The Raven", a reviewer who saw parts of Tamerlane and Other Poems commented, "'Poems written during youth' no matter by whom written, are best preserved for the eye of the writer". Modern scholar Joseph Wood Krutch said the collection "save for a few poems, [was] distinctly prentice work". Poe biographer Arthur Hobson Quinn wrote: "The perfection which marked Poe's great lyrics was, of course, not yet present. But the promise was there." Quinn also credits Poe for publishing a collection of poetry before slightly older contemporaries who would become popular poets, including Ralph Waldo Emerson, Henry Wadsworth Longfellow, John Greenleaf Whittier, and Oliver Wendell Holmes Sr. Scholar Harry Lee Poe, a distant relative of Poe, wrote in 2008 that the collection did not include great poetry. However, he added, "it was the trumpet blast announcing that a new poet had stepped upon the stage".

== Content ==
The work was originally published without a table of contents; later editions and commentary use the titles or first lines to identify the poems. Much of the content was reworked, occasionally retitled, by Poe for later collections.

- The preface, pages iii-iv
- "Tamerlane"

Other poems, also known as "Fugitive pieces"

- "To — — " (now known as "Song")
- Dreams
- "Visits of the Dead" (now known as "Spirits of the Dead")
- "Evening Star"
- "Imitation"
- Untitled poem: "In youth have I known . . ." ("Stanzas")
- Untitled poem: "A wilder'd being from my birth . . ." (see "A Dream")
- Untitled poem: "The happiest day — the happiest hour . . ." (see "The Happiest Day")
- "The Lake"
- The author's endnotes
