= The Imp of the Perverse =

1845 work by Edgar Allan Poe

- Short story by Edgar Allan Poe
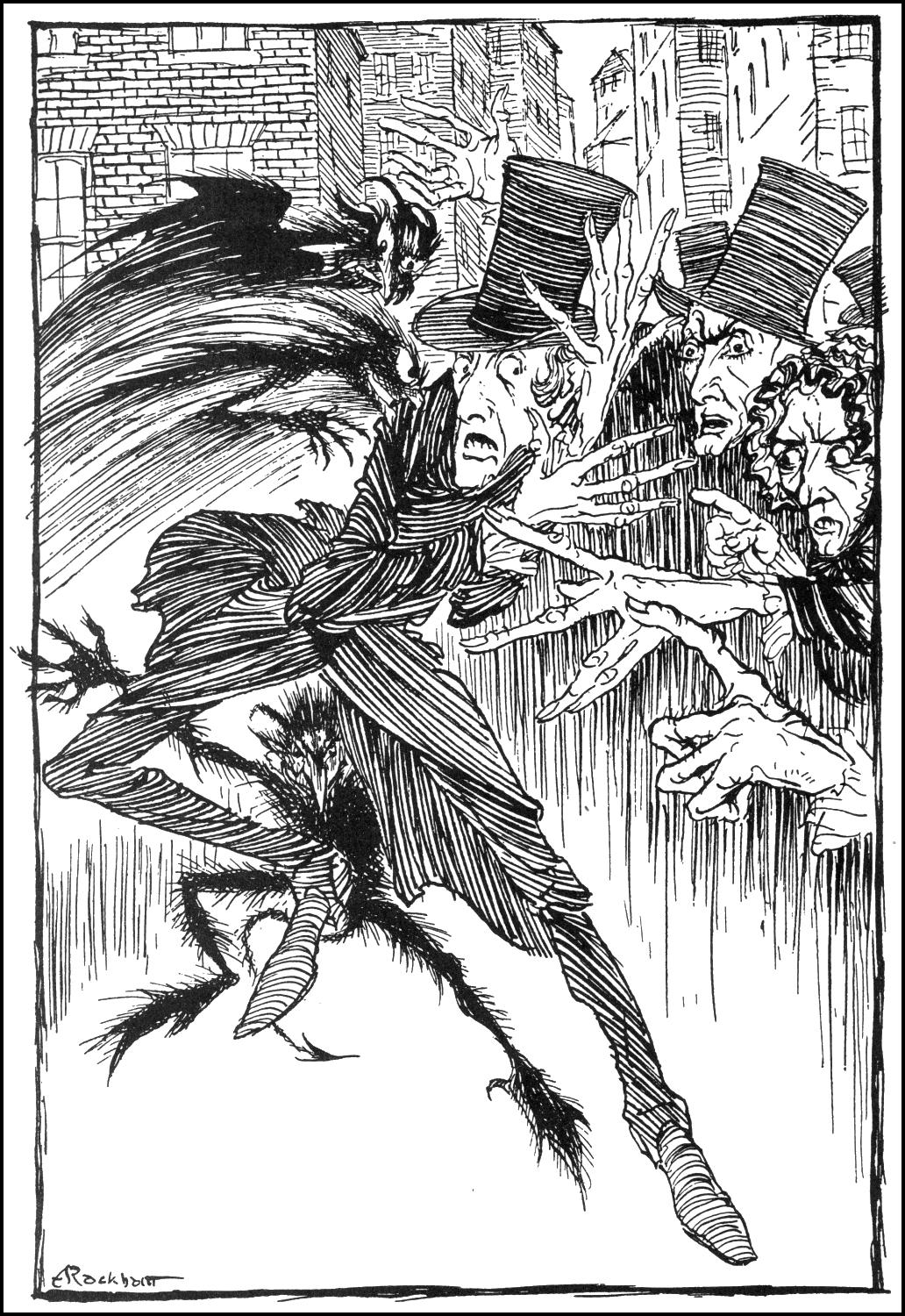
- 1935 illustration by Arthur Rackham
- Country: United States
- Language: English
- Genre: Short story

Publication
- Published in: Graham's Magazine
- Publication date: July 1845

"The Imp of the Perverse" is a short story by 19th-century American author and critic Edgar Allan Poe. Beginning as an essay, it discusses the narrator's self-destructive impulses, embodied as the symbolic metaphor of "the Imp of the Perverse". The narrator describes this spirit as the agent that tempts a person to do things "merely because we feel we should not."

In the story, the narrator commits murder to inherit a man's estate. A coroner attributes the death to an act of God, and the narrator benefits from his crime. Several years later, the narrator starts obsessing about a possible confession for his crime. He acts on a self-destructive impulse, and confesses his crime in public, leading to his swift trial and execution.

== Plot summary ==
The narrator explains at length his theory on "The Imp of the Perverse", which he believes causes people to commit acts against their self-interest. This essay-like discussion is presented objectively, though the narrator admits that he is "one of the many uncounted victims of the Imp of the Perverse". He then explains how his conviction for murder was the result of this.

The narrator begins his story by explaining how he murdered a man by using a candle that emitted a poisonous vapor: The victim enjoyed reading in bed at night and, using the candle for illumination, dies in his poorly ventilated room. No evidence is left behind, causing the coroner to believe the man's death is an act of God. The narrator inherits the man's estate and, knowing he can never be caught, enjoys the benefits of his murderous act for many years.

The narrator remains unsuspected, though he occasionally reassures himself by repeating under his breath, "I am safe". One day, he notes that he will remain safe only if he is not foolish enough to openly confess. In saying so, however, he begins to question if he is capable of confessing, and is beginning to feel overpowered by a sudden urge to confess to the murder. He fearfully runs through the streets, arousing suspicion. When finally stopped, he feels struck by some "invisible fiend". He reveals his secret with "distinct enunciation", though in such a hurry as if afraid of being interrupted. He is quickly tried and convicted of murder and sentenced to death by hanging.

== Analysis ==
"The Imp of the Perverse" begins as an essay rather than as a work of fiction, a format that Poe previously used in "The Premature Burial". It is, therefore, less about plot and more about theory. As Poe describes this theory:

We stand upon the brink of a precipice. We peer into the abyss—we grow sick and dizzy. Our first impulse is to shrink away from the danger. Unaccountably we remain... it is but a thought, although a fearful one, and one which chills the very marrow of our bones with the fierceness of the delight of its horror. It is merely the idea of what would be our sensations during the sweeping precipitancy of a fall from such a height... for this very cause do we now the most vividly desire it.

The work theorizes that all people have self-destructive tendencies, including the narrator. The narrator's ultimate confession as a murderer is not inspired by any feelings of guilt but, instead, from an overwhelming desire to publicize his actions despite knowing that he should not.

The story may have been inspired by John Neal's, "Idiosyncracies," a short story similar to Poe's published two years earlier in Brother Jonathan.

The story has been noted for its psychological analysis of human behavior and motivations presaging the concepts of Sigmund Freud and Carl Jung and psychoanalysis. "Of all of Poe’s stories, this is one of the strongest tales to prefigure the ideas of Sigmund Freud, the founder of psychoanalysis" according to Dr. Oliver Tearle of Loughborough University. Poe's theory of the Imp of the Perverse may also be an early notion of the subconscious and repression which would not be fully theorized until Freud.

Many of Poe's characters display a failure to resist the Imp of the Perverse—including the murderer in "The Black Cat" and the narrator in "The Tell-Tale Heart". The opposite of this impulse is seen in Poe's character C. Auguste Dupin who exhibits reason and deep analysis. One of the earliest examples, which predates "The Imp of the Perverse", was in Poe's novel The Narrative of Arthur Gordon Pym of Nantucket. In one scene, the title character is overcome by an overwhelming desire to let himself fall off a steep cliff.

Additionally, scholars and critics suggest that Poe had his own Imp of the Perverse. Poe biographer Jeffrey Meyers suggested that Poe wrote it to justify his own actions of self-torment and self-destruction. James M. Hutchisson says that the work reflects Poe's jealousy and sense of betrayal that led to his public feud with Henry Wadsworth Longfellow and New England literary culture; the so-called "Longfellow War" was occurring at the same time Poe wrote "The Imp of the Perverse". Three months after the story was published, Poe lashed out against Boston's literary circle by trying to hoax them by reading his obscure poem "Al Aaraaf" at a lecture. Biographer Daniel Stashower suggests Poe's purposeful attempt to provoke his audience and alienate himself further was inspired by his Imp of the Perverse.

== Publication history ==
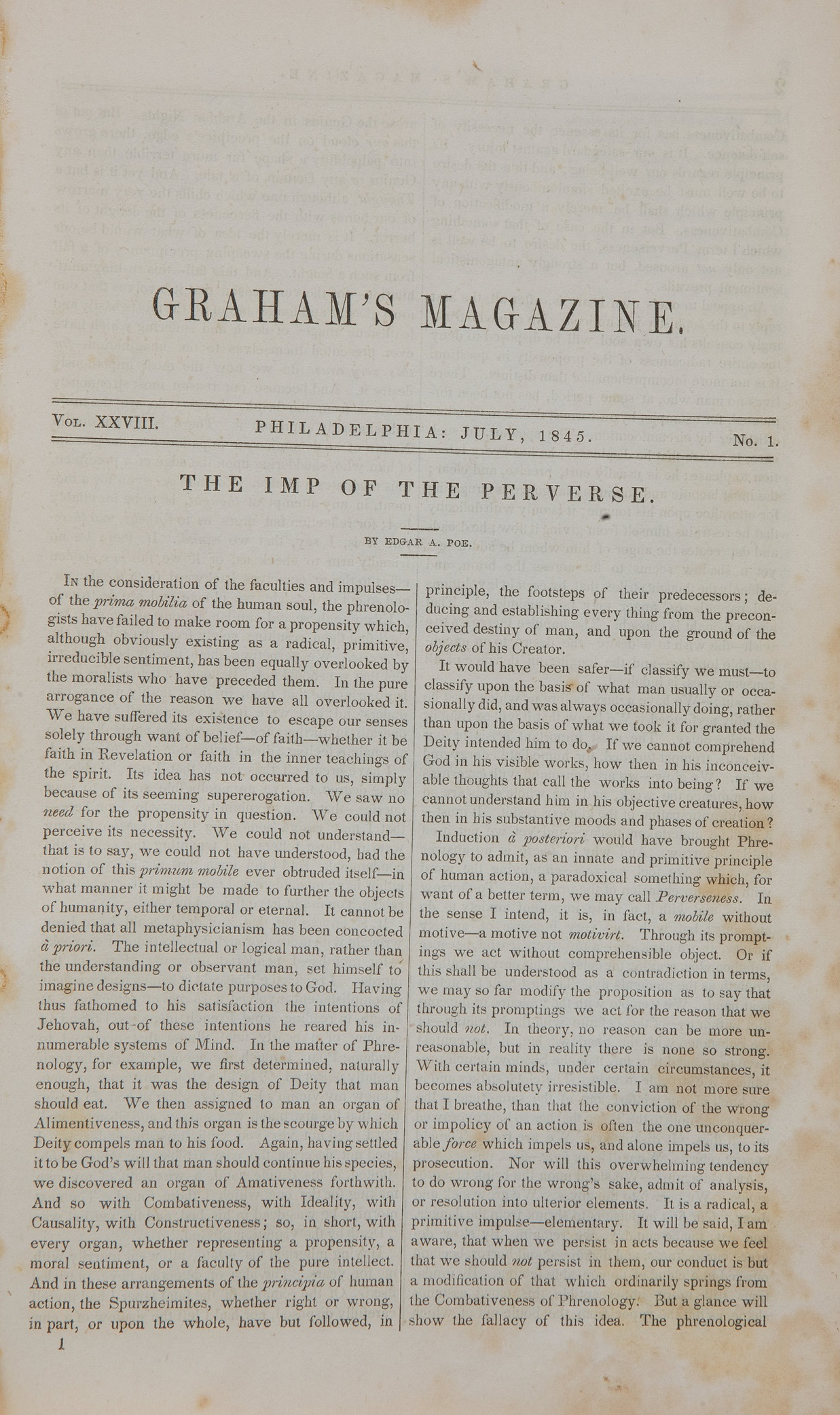
First appearance in the July 1845 issue of Graham's Magazine, Vol. XXVIII, Philadelphia

"The Imp of the Perverse" was first published in the July 1845 issue of Graham's Magazine. A slightly revised version appeared in the Boston-based gift book May-Flower for 1846.

== Critical response ==
Poe reported in the Broadway Journal in December 1845 that the Nassau Monthly at Princeton College harshly criticized "The Imp of the Perverse". Calling it a "humbug", the reviewer noted that the author's line of reasoning about this philosophical idea was difficult to follow. "He chases from the wilderness of phrenology into that of transcendentalism, then into that of metaphysics generally; then through many weary pages into the open field of inductive philosophy, where he at last corners the poor thing, and then most unmercifully pokes it to death with a long stick."
