= Franklin Lyceum =

The Franklin Lyceum (est. 1831) of Providence, Rhode Island was a membership organization dedicated to autodidacticism in the 19th century. Its members engaged in debates and maintained "a library, and a cabinet of minerals, shells, chemical apparatus and antiquities." It organized lectures by notables such as John Quincy Adams, Samuel L. Clemens, Anna E. Dickinson, Ralph Waldo Emerson, Horace Greeley, George S. Hillard, Oliver Wendell Holmes Sr., Sam Houston, Edgar Allan Poe, Charles Sumner. Around 1852, the group organized a circulating library of more than 1,000 volumes, and Lyceum Hall was dedicated in 1858. The group remained active into the 1890s.
