= Graham's Magazine =

19th-century American periodical

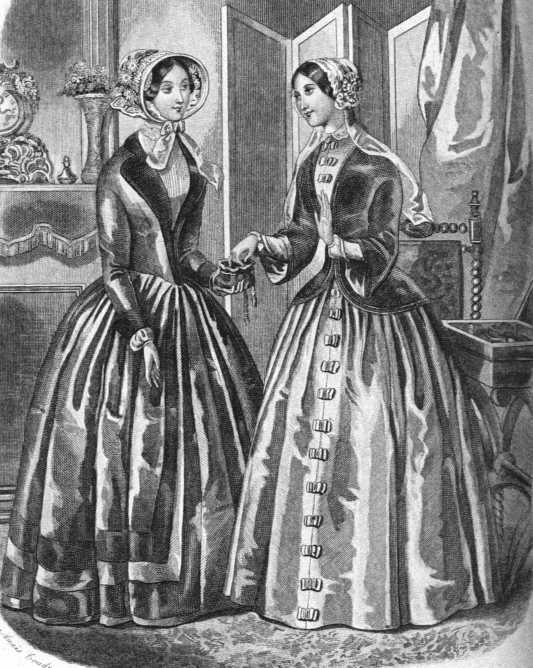
Fashion plate from an 1849 issue of Graham's Magazine.

Graham's Magazine was a nineteenth-century periodical based in Philadelphia established by George Rex Graham and published from 1840 to 1858. It was alternatively referred to as Graham's Lady's and Gentleman's Magazine (1841–1842, and July 1843 – June 1844), Graham's Magazine of Literature and Art (January 1844 – June 1844), Graham's American Monthly Magazine of Literature and Art (July 1848 – June 1856), and Graham's Illustrated Magazine of Literature, Romance, Art, and Fashion (July 1856 – 1858).

The journal was founded after the merger of Burton's Gentleman's Magazine and Atkinson's Casket in 1840. Publishing short stories, critical reviews, and music as well as information on fashion, Graham intended the journal to reach all audiences including both men and women. He offered the high payment of $5 per page, successfully attracting some of the best-known writers of the day. It also became known for its engravings and artwork. Graham's may have been the first magazine in the United States to copyright each issue.

Edgar Allan Poe became the editor of Graham's in February 1841 and soon was publishing the harsh critical reviews for which he became known. It was also where he first published "The Murders in the Rue Morgue", now recognized as the first detective story. After Poe left the journal, his successor was Rufus Wilmot Griswold, a man who bitterly disliked Poe. Graham's began rejecting Poe's submissions and passed up the chance to publish "The Raven". Graham left his magazine for a time in 1848 and it eventually ceased in 1858.

== History ==
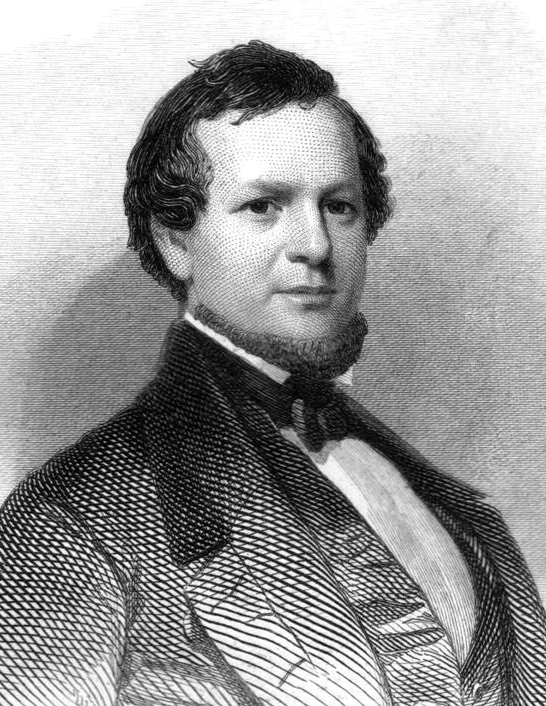
George Rex Graham, founder and editor of Graham's Magazine

In December 1840, Graham had just acquired Burton's Gentleman's Magazine for $3,500, paying a dollar for each of its 3,500 subscribers, and merged it with another recently purchased magazine, Atkinson's Casket, which only had 1500 subscribers. The Casket, subtitled "Flowers of Literature, Wit, and Sentiment" had been in existence since 1826 and, despite the small subscriber base, was flourishing financially.

Graham intended his new magazine to be popular amongst both men and women, containing fashion, photographs, music, short stories and critical reviews. He also hoped to reach out to both mainstream audiences and those with more refined tastes. Graham was not a writer himself, other than a section at the back of each issue called "Graham's Small Talk", and so relied heavily on contributors. To that end, Graham made sure it was popular amongst writers as a well-paying journal; the $5 standard become known as a "Graham page". Other journals at the time were paying the standard rate of $1 per page. His attempt at attracting the best contributors worked: Contributors to the magazine included William Cullen Bryant, Nathaniel Hawthorne, James Russell Lowell, Christopher Pearse Cranch, Fitz-Greene Halleck, George D. Prentice, Alice, Horace Binney Wallace, and Phoebe Cary. Not all writers, however, were paid. A notice in the May 1841 issue read:

"Writers who send articles to this Magazine for publication, must state distinctly at the time of sending them, whether they expect pay. We cannot allow compensation unless by special contract before publication. This rule will hereafter be rigidly enforced."

James Fenimore Cooper was reportedly the highest-paid contributor to Graham's, receiving $1,600 for the serial "The Islets of the Gulf, or Rose-Budd", later published as Jack Tier, or The Florida Reefs. He received another $1,000 for a series of biographies on distinguished naval commanders. Graham's at one point was advertised as having the most distinctive list of contributors ever achieved by any American magazine. Graham's boasted that many issues of his magazine cost $1,500 for "authorship" alone.

Graham's may have been the first magazine in America to copyright each issue. By March 1842, Graham's Magazine was issuing 40,000 copies. This boom was reflective of a changing market in American readership. John Sartain believed its success was due to the appeal of the engravings he provided for each issue. The Saturday Evening Post reported that the August 1841 issue of Graham's cost $1,300 for these "embellishments". The Post reported April 30, 1842: "It is doubtful, if engravings of equal beauty ever adorned an American work". Typical engravings in Graham's included bridges, happy maids, and scenes which focused on peaceful domestic life and promoted marriage. The editorial staff grew to include "two lady editors", Ann S. Stephens and Emma Catherine Embury.

=== Poe as editor ===
Graham hired Edgar Allan Poe as a critic and editor in February 1841 at an annual salary of $800. Poe suspended his plans to start his own journal, The Penn, to work for Graham, who promised to help subsidize Poe's entrepreneurial endeavor within a year, though he never did. Poe complained about the content of Graham's; he particularly disliked "the contemptible pictures, fashion-plates, music and love tales" for which the magazine was known. Graham, however, was aware of Poe's status as an author and critic and knew he would increase the magazine's popularity. He introduced his new editor in the pages of the magazine: "Mr. POE is too well known in the literary world to require a word of commendation."

Poe had an assistant editor who aided in corresponding with contributors, allowing him enough free time to write his own stories. Poe also had a decent relationship with Graham and took advantage of the editorial control he was granted. The magazine was the first to publish "The Murders in the Rue Morgue", "A Descent into the Maelström", "The Island of the Fay", "The Mask Of The Red Death - A Fantasy", and others. He also reviewed Charles Dickens's The Old Curiosity Shop, Nathaniel Hawthorne's Twice-Told Tales, and works by Henry Wadsworth Longfellow, Washington Irving and many others. He also further built up his reputation as a harsh literary critic, causing James Russell Lowell to suggest Poe sometimes mistook "his phial of prussic acid for his inkstand". With Graham's, Poe also launched his Literati of New York series, which purportedly analyzes the signatures of well-known figures in the New York scene, but which featured Poe taking pot-shots at their personalities. The Philadelphia Inquirer in October 1841 called Poe's article "the most singular, and at the same time, the most interesting article" in the magazine.

Poe left Graham's employ in April 1842 but still made occasional contributions. In 1847, he voluntarily took a cut in the usual payment to $4 per page to cover a debt he owed to Graham.

Though he originally called his salary "liberal," Poe would later complain of his "nambypamby" payment of $800 per year when compared to Graham's alleged $25,000 in profit. A possibly apocryphal story is that Poe returned to the office in April 1842 after a brief illness to find Charles Peterson, another editor, sitting at his desk and performing his duties. Upset, he impulsively resigned on the spot. By then, however, he had already made a significant impact on Graham's. A year after Poe's departure, Philadelphia editor George Lippard said, "It was Mr. Poe that made Graham's Magazine what it was a year ago; it was his intellect that gave this now weak and flimsy periodical a tone of refinement and mental vigor".

=== After Poe ===
Rufus Wilmot Griswold, a well-known critic and anthologist as well as Poe's greatest rival, took over editing after Poe's departure in April 1842. The replacement was so quick, a rumor persisted for years that Poe went to work one day and saw Griswold already in his chair. Though the story is not true, Griswold's hiring and Poe's departure were somewhat controversial. As reported in the Washington Index Jesse E. Dow wrote: "We would give more for Edgar A. Poe's toe nail, than we would for Rueful Grizzle's soul, unless we wanted a milk-strainer. Them's our sentiments." Griswold was reportedly paid a salary of $1000 a year, $200 more than Poe. As an editor, Griswold had some success, including a contract with Henry Wadsworth Longfellow to write for Graham's exclusively for a time. Longfellow was paid about $50 for each poem printed. Graham's was also the first to publish Longfellow's play The Spanish Student in 1842; he was paid $150 for it.

By September 1842, Graham was unhappy with Griswold's work and made an offer for Poe to return, though he refused. Late in 1844 Poe offered first publication of "The Raven" to Graham, who turned it down. Some accounts say Graham may have given $15 to Poe as a friendly charity, but that he did not like the poem. Graham made it up to Poe a short while later by publishing the essay "The Philosophy of Composition" in which Poe tells of his inspiration for his famous poem and his theories on good writing. Joseph Ripley Chandler and Bayard Taylor also had short runs as editorial assistants for the magazine in 1848 and Edwin Percy Whipple was its main literary critic for a time.

=== Decline ===
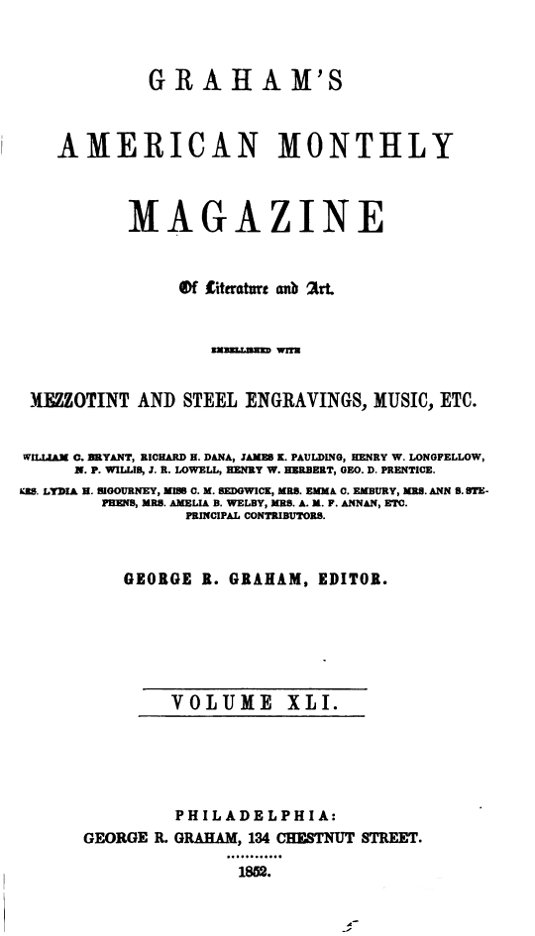
Title page for Graham's Magazine, June 1852

In 1848, after some financial difficulties caused by poor copper investments, Graham sold the magazine to Samuel Dewee Patterson, though he retained the title of editor. Sartain, whose engravings had become an important part of Graham's, left to found his own journal, Sartain's Union Magazine, in 1849. People who sympathized with Graham's difficulties helped him regain some of his fortune and he bought back his interest in the magazine in 1850. Competition with Harper's New Monthly Magazine beginning in that year caused significant drops in subscriptions, as did the lack of an international copyright. Charles Godfrey Leland took over when Graham left the magazine in 1853 or 1854 and Graham's Magazine ceased publication in 1858.

== See also ==
Other American journals that Edgar Allan Poe was involved with include:

- American Review: A Whig Journal
- Broadway Journal
- Burton's Gentleman's Magazine
- Godey's Lady's Book
- Southern Literary Messenger
- The Stylus
