= The Raven =

1845 narrative poem by Edgar Allan Poe

- by Edgar Allan Poe
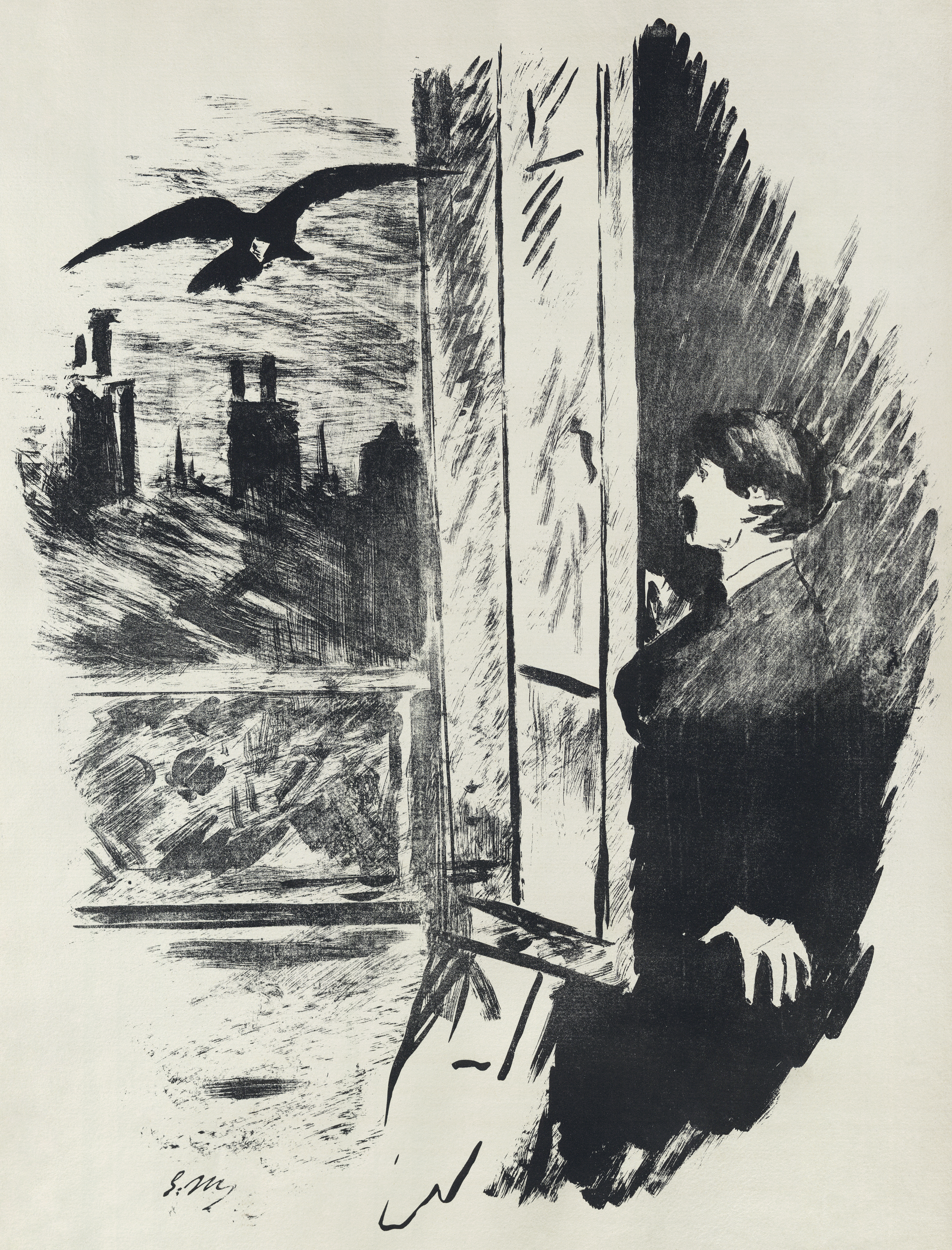
- "The Raven" depicts a mysterious raven's midnight visit to a mourning narrator, as illustrated by Édouard Manet (1875), digitally restored.
- First published in: New York Evening Mirror
- Country: United States
- Language: English
- Publication date: January 29, 1845
- Media type: Newspaper
- Lines: 108

Full text
- The Raven (Poe) at Wikisource

"The Raven"

"The Raven" is a narrative poem by American writer Edgar Allan Poe. First published in January 1845, the poem is often noted for its musicality, stylized language and supernatural atmosphere. It tells of a distraught lover who is paid a visit by a mysterious raven that repeatedly speaks a single word: "nevermore". The lover, often identified as a student, is lamenting the loss of his love, Lenore. Sitting on a bust of Pallas, the raven seems to antagonize the protagonist further with its repetition of the word. The poem makes use of folk, mythological, religious, and classical references.

Poe stated that he composed the poem in a logical and methodical manner, aiming to craft a piece that would resonate with both critical and popular audiences, as he elaborated in his follow-up essay in 1846, "The Philosophy of Composition". The poem was inspired in part by a talking raven in the 1841 novel Barnaby Rudge by Charles Dickens. Poe based the complex rhythm and meter on Elizabeth Barrett's poem "Lady Geraldine's Courtship" and made use of internal rhyme as well as alliteration throughout.

"The Raven" was first attributed to Poe in print in the New York Evening Mirror on January 29, 1845. Its publication made Poe popular in his lifetime, although it did not bring him much financial success. The poem was soon reprinted, parodied, and illustrated. Critical opinion is divided as to the poem's literary status, but it nevertheless remains one of the most famous poems ever written.

== Synopsis ==
The Raven

Once upon a midnight dreary, while I pondered, weak and weary,
Over many a quaint and curious volume of forgotten lore—
While I nodded, nearly napping, suddenly there came a tapping,
As of some one gently rapping, rapping at my chamber door.
"'Tis some visiter," I muttered, "tapping at my chamber door—
Only this and nothing more."

Ah, distinctly I remember it was in the bleak December;
And each separate dying ember wrought its ghost upon the floor.
Eagerly I wished the morrow;—vainly I had sought to borrow
From my books surcease of sorrow—sorrow for the lost Lenore—
For the rare and radiant maiden whom the angels name Lenore—
Nameless here for evermore.

And the silken, sad, uncertain rustling of each purple curtain
Thrilled me—filled me with fantastic terrors never felt before;
So that now, to still the beating of my heart, I stood repeating
"'Tis some visiter entreating entrance at my chamber door—
Some late visiter entreating entrance at my chamber door;—
This it is and nothing more."

Presently my soul grew stronger; hesitating then no longer,
"Sir," said I, "or Madam, truly your forgiveness I implore;
But the fact is I was napping, and so gently you came rapping,
And so faintly you came tapping, tapping at my chamber door,
That I scarce was sure I heard you"—here I opened wide the door;—
Darkness there and nothing more.

Deep into that darkness peering, long I stood there wondering, fearing,
Doubting, dreaming dreams no mortal ever dared to dream before;
But the silence was unbroken, and the stillness gave no token,
And the only word there spoken was the whispered word, "Lenore?"
This I whispered, and an echo murmured back the word, "Lenore!"—
Merely this and nothing more.

Back into the chamber turning, all my soul within me burning,
Soon again I heard a tapping somewhat louder than before.
"Surely," said I, "surely that is something at my window lattice;
Let me see, then, what thereat is, and this mystery explore—
Let my heart be still a moment and this mystery explore;—
'Tis the wind and nothing more!"

Open here I flung the shutter, when, with many a flirt and flutter,
In there stepped a stately Raven of the saintly days of yore;
Not the least obeisance made he; not a minute stopped or stayed he;
But, with mien of lord or lady, perched above my chamber door—
Perched upon a bust of Pallas just above my chamber door—
Perched, and sat, and nothing more.

Then this ebony bird beguiling my sad fancy into smiling,
By the grave and stern decorum of the countenance it wore,
"Though thy crest be shorn and shaven, thou," I said, "art sure no craven,
Ghastly grim and ancient Raven wandering from the Nightly shore—
Tell me what thy lordly name is on the Night's Plutonian shore!"
Quoth the Raven "Nevermore."

Much I marvelled this ungainly fowl to hear discourse so plainly,
Though its answer little meaning—little relevancy bore;
For we cannot help agreeing that no living human being
Ever yet was blessed with seeing bird above his chamber door—
Bird or beast upon the sculptured bust above his chamber door,
With such name as "Nevermore."

But the Raven, sitting lonely on the placid bust, spoke only
That one word, as if his soul in that one word he did outpour.
Nothing farther then he uttered—not a feather then he fluttered—
Till I scarcely more than muttered "Other friends have flown before—
On the morrow he will leave me, as my Hopes have flown before."
Then the bird said "Nevermore."

Startled at the stillness broken by reply so aptly spoken,
"Doubtless," said I, "what it utters is its only stock and store
Caught from some unhappy master whom unmerciful Disaster
Followed fast and followed faster till his songs one burden bore—
Till the dirges of his Hope that melancholy burden bore
Of 'Never—nevermore'."

But the Raven still beguiling my sad fancy into smiling,
Straight I wheeled a cushioned seat in front of bird, and bust and door;
Then, upon the velvet sinking, I betook myself to linking
Fancy unto fancy, thinking what this ominous bird of yore—
What this grim, ungainly, ghastly, gaunt, and ominous bird of yore
Meant in croaking "Nevermore."

This I sat engaged in guessing, but no syllable expressing
To the fowl whose fiery eyes now burned into my bosom's core;
This and more I sat divining, with my head at ease reclining
On the cushion's velvet lining that the lamp-light gloated o'er,
But whose velvet-violet lining with the lamp-light gloating o'er,
She shall press, ah, nevermore!

Then, methought, the air grew denser, perfumed from an unseen censer
Swung by seraphim whose foot-falls tinkled on the tufted floor.
"Wretch," I cried, "thy God hath lent thee—by these angels he hath sent thee
Respite—respite and nepenthe, from thy memories of Lenore;
Quaff, oh quaff this kind nepenthe and forget this lost Lenore!"
Quoth the Raven "Nevermore."

"Prophet!" said I, "thing of evil!—prophet still, if bird or devil!—
Whether Tempter sent, or whether tempest tossed thee here ashore,
Desolate yet all undaunted, on this desert land enchanted—
On this home by Horror haunted—tell me truly, I implore—
Is there—is there balm in Gilead?—tell me—tell me, I implore!"
Quoth the Raven "Nevermore."

"Prophet!" said I, "thing of evil!—prophet still, if bird or devil!
By that Heaven that bends above us—by that God we both adore—
Tell this soul with sorrow laden if, within the distant Aidenn,
It shall clasp a sainted maiden whom the angels name Lenore—
Clasp a rare and radiant maiden whom the angels name Lenore."
Quoth the Raven "Nevermore."

"Be that word our sign of parting, bird or fiend!" I shrieked, upstarting—
"Get thee back into the tempest and the Night's Plutonian shore!
Leave no black plume as a token of that lie thy soul hath spoken!
Leave my loneliness unbroken!—quit the bust above my door!
Take thy beak from out my heart, and take thy form from off my door!"
Quoth the Raven "Nevermore."

And the Raven, never flitting, still is sitting, still is sitting
On the pallid bust of Pallas just above my chamber door;
And his eyes have all the seeming of a demon's that is dreaming,
And the lamp-light o'er him streaming throws his shadow on the floor;
And my soul from out that shadow that lies floating on the floor
Shall be lifted—nevermore!

— Edgar Allan Poe

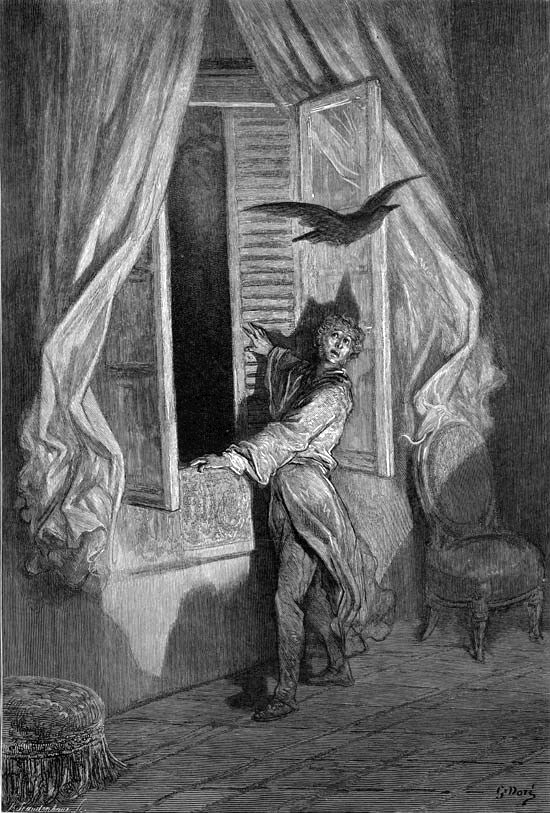
"Not the least obeisance made he" (7:3), as illustrated by Gustave Doré (1884)

"The Raven" follows an unnamed narrator on a dreary night in December who sits reading "forgotten lore" by the remains of a fire as a way to forget the death of his beloved Lenore. A "tapping at [his] chamber door" reveals nothing, but excites his soul to "burning". The tapping is repeated, slightly louder, and he realizes it is coming from his window. When he goes to investigate, a raven flutters into his chamber. Paying no attention to the man, the raven perches on a bust of Pallas above the door.

Amused by the raven's comically serious disposition, the man asks that the bird tell him its name. The raven's only answer is "Nevermore". The narrator is surprised that the raven can talk, though at this point it has said nothing further. The narrator remarks to himself that his "friend" the raven will soon fly out of his life, just as "other friends have flown before" along with his previous hopes. As if answering, the raven responds again with "Nevermore". The narrator reasons that the bird learned the word "Nevermore" from some "unhappy master" and that it is the only word it knows.

Even so, the narrator pulls his chair directly in front of the raven, determined to learn more about it. He thinks for a moment in silence, and his mind wanders back to his lost Lenore. He thinks the air grows denser and feels the presence of angels, and wonders if God is sending him a sign that he is to forget Lenore. The bird again replies in the negative, suggesting that he can never be free of his memories. The narrator becomes angry, calling the raven a "thing of evil" and a "prophet". Finally, he asks the raven whether he will be reunited with Lenore in Heaven. When the raven responds with its typical "Nevermore", he is enraged, and, calling the bird a liar, commands it to return to the "Plutonian shore"—but it does not move. At the time of the poem's narration, the raven "still is sitting" on the bust of Pallas. The raven casts a shadow on the chamber floor, and the despondent narrator laments that out of this shadow his soul shall be "lifted 'nevermore'".

== Analysis ==
Poe wrote the poem as a narrative, without intentional allegory or didacticism. The main theme of the poem is one of undying devotion. The narrator experiences a perverse conflict between desire to forget and desire to remember. He seems to get some pleasure from focusing on loss. The narrator assumes that the word "Nevermore" is the raven's "only stock and store", and, yet, he continues to ask it questions, knowing what the answer will be. His questions, then, are purposely self-deprecating and further incite his feelings of loss. Poe leaves it unclear whether the raven actually knows what it is saying or whether it really intends to cause a reaction in the poem's narrator. The narrator begins as "weak and weary", becomes regretful and grief-stricken, before passing into a frenzy and, finally, madness. Christopher F. S. Maligec suggests the poem is a type of elegiac paraclausithyron, an ancient Greek and Roman poetic form consisting of the lament of an excluded, locked-out lover at the sealed door of his beloved.

=== Allusions ===
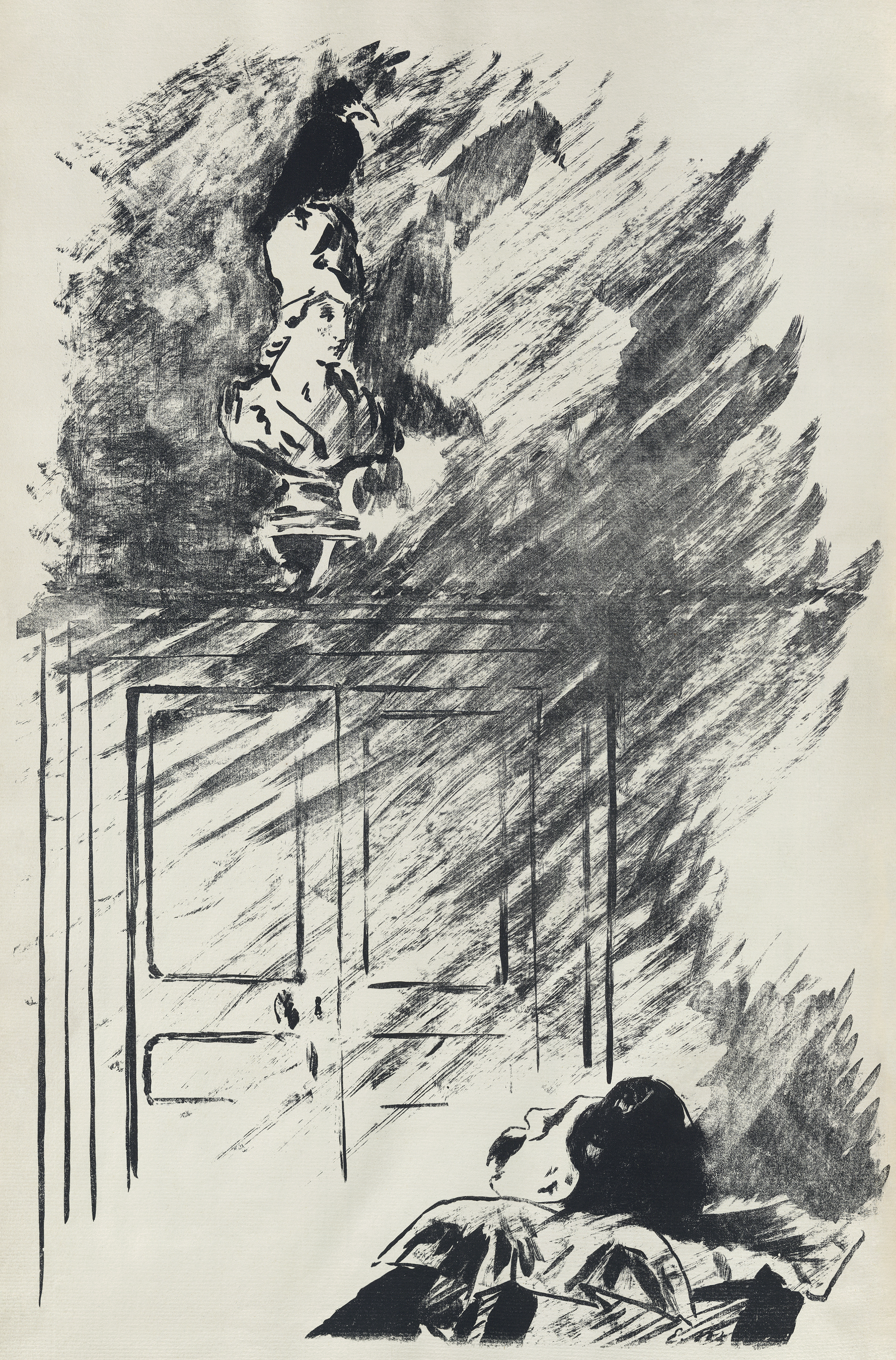
The raven perches on a bust of Pallas Athena, a symbol of wisdom meant to imply the narrator is a scholar. Illustration by Édouard Manet for Stéphane Mallarmé's translation, Le Corbeau (1875).

Poe says that the narrator is a young scholar. Though this is not explicitly stated in the poem, it is mentioned in "The Philosophy of Composition". It is also suggested by the narrator reading books of "lore" as well as by the bust of Pallas Athena, Greek goddess of wisdom.

He is reading in the late night hours from "many a quaint and curious volume of forgotten lore". Similar to the studies suggested in Poe's short story "Ligeia", this lore may be about the occult or black magic. This is also emphasized in the author's choice to set the poem in December, a month which is traditionally associated with the forces of darkness. The use of the raven—the "devil bird"—also suggests this. This devil image is emphasized by the narrator's belief that the raven is "from the Night's Plutonian shore", or a messenger from the afterlife, referring to Pluto, the Roman god of the underworld.

Poe chose a raven as the central symbol in the story because he wanted a "non-reasoning" creature capable of speech. He decided on a raven, which he considered "equally capable of speech" as a parrot, because it matched the intended tone of the poem. Poe said the raven is meant to symbolize "Mournful and Never-ending Remembrance". He was also inspired by Grip, the raven in Barnaby Rudge: A Tale of the Riots of Eighty by Charles Dickens. One scene in particular bears a resemblance to "The Raven": at the end of the fifth chapter of Dickens's novel, Grip makes a noise and someone says, "What was that—him tapping at the door?" The response is, "'Tis someone knocking softly at the shutter." Dickens's raven could speak many words and had many comic turns, including the popping of a champagne cork, but Poe emphasized the bird's more dramatic qualities. Poe had written a review of Barnaby Rudge for Graham's Magazine saying, among other things, that the raven should have served a more symbolic, prophetic purpose. The similarity did not go unnoticed: James Russell Lowell in his A Fable for Critics wrote the verse, "Here comes Poe with his raven, like Barnaby Rudge / Three-fifths of him genius and two-fifths sheer fudge." The Free Library of Philadelphia has on display a taxidermied raven that is reputed to be the very one that Dickens owned and that helped inspire Poe's poem.

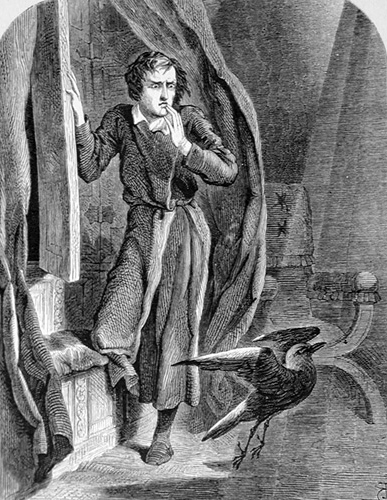
Rendition of "The Raven" as illustrated by John Tenniel (1858)

Poe may also have been drawing upon various references to ravens in mythology and folklore. In Norse mythology, Odin possessed two ravens named Huginn and Muninn, representing thought and memory. According to Hebrew folklore, Noah sends a white raven to check conditions while on the ark. It learns that the floodwaters are beginning to dissipate, but it does not immediately return with the news. It is punished by being turned black and being forced to feed on carrion forever. In Ovid's Metamorphoses, a raven also begins as white before Apollo punishes it by turning it black for delivering a message of a lover's unfaithfulness. The raven's role as a messenger in Poe's poem may draw from those stories.

Poe mentions the Balm of Gilead, a reference to the Book of Jeremiah (8:22) in the Bible: "Is there no balm in Gilead; is there no physician there? why then is not the health of the daughter of my people recovered?" In that context, the Balm of Gilead is a resin used for medicinal purposes (suggesting, perhaps, that the narrator needs to be healed after the loss of Lenore). In 1 Kings 17:1–5 Elijah is said to be from Gilead, and to have been fed by ravens during a period of drought.

=== Poetic structure ===
The poem is made up of 18 stanzas of six lines each. Generally, the meter is trochaic octameter—eight trochaic feet per line, each foot having one stressed syllable followed by one unstressed syllable. The first line, for example (with ´ marking stressed syllables and ˘ marking unstressed):

Syllabic structure of a verse
Stress	´	˘	´	˘	´	˘	´	˘	´	˘	´	˘	´	˘	´	˘
Syllable	Once	up-	on	a	mid-	night	drea-	ry,	while	I	pon-	dered	weak	and	wea-	ry

Poe, however, claimed the poem was a combination of octameter acatalectic, heptameter catalectic, and tetrameter catalectic. The rhyme scheme is ABCBBB, or AA,B,CC,CB,B,B when accounting for internal rhyme. In every stanza, the "B" lines rhyme with the word "nevermore" and are catalectic, placing extra emphasis on the final syllable. The poem also makes heavy use of alliteration ("Doubting, dreaming dreams ..."). Twentieth-century American poet Daniel Hoffman suggested that the poem's structure and meter is so formulaic that it is artificial, though its mesmeric quality overrides that.

Poe based the structure of "The Raven" on the complicated rhyme and rhythm of Elizabeth Barrett's poem "Lady Geraldine's Courtship". Poe had reviewed Barrett's work in the January 1845 issue of the Broadway Journal and said that "her poetic inspiration is the highest—we can conceive of nothing more august. Her sense of Art is pure in itself." As is typical with Poe, his review also criticizes her lack of originality and what he considers the repetitive nature of some of her poetry. About "Lady Geraldine's Courtship", he said "I have never read a poem combining so much of the fiercest passion with so much of the most delicate imagination."

== Publication history ==
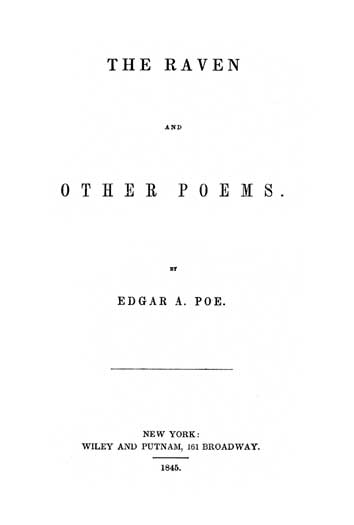
The poem was first collected in The Raven and Other Poems, Wiley and Putnam, New York, 1845.

Poe first brought "The Raven" to his friend and former employer George Rex Graham of Graham's Magazine in Philadelphia. Graham declined the poem, which may not have been in its final version, though he gave Poe $15 (equivalent to $518 in 2025) as charity. Poe then sold the poem to The American Review, which paid him $9 (equivalent to $311 in 2025) for it, and printed "The Raven" in its February 1845 issue under the pseudonym "Quarles", a reference to the English poet Francis Quarles. The poem's first publication with Poe's name was in the Evening Mirror on January 29, 1845, as an "advance copy". Nathaniel Parker Willis, editor of the Mirror, introduced it as "unsurpassed in English poetry for subtle conception, masterly ingenuity of versification, and consistent, sustaining of imaginative lift ... It will stick to the memory of everybody who reads it." Following this publication the poem appeared in periodicals across the United States, including the New York Tribune (February 4, 1845), Broadway Journal (vol. 1, February 8, 1845), Southern Literary Messenger (vol. 11, March 1845), Literary Emporium (vol. 2, December 1845), Saturday Courier, 16 (July 25, 1846), and the Richmond Examiner (September 25, 1849).

The immediate success of "The Raven" prompted Wiley and Putnam to publish a collection of Poe's prose called Tales in June 1845; it was his first book in five years. They also published a collection of his poetry called The Raven and Other Poems on November 19 which was the first time the poem was collected and which included a dedication to Barrett as "the Noblest of her Sex". The small volume, his first book of poetry in 14 years, was 100 pages and sold for 31 cents. In addition to the title poem, it included "The Valley of Unrest", "Bridal Ballad", "The City in the Sea", "Eulalie", "The Conqueror Worm", "The Haunted Palace" and 11 others. In the preface, Poe referred to them as "trifles" which had been altered without his permission as they made "the rounds of the press".

=== Illustrators ===
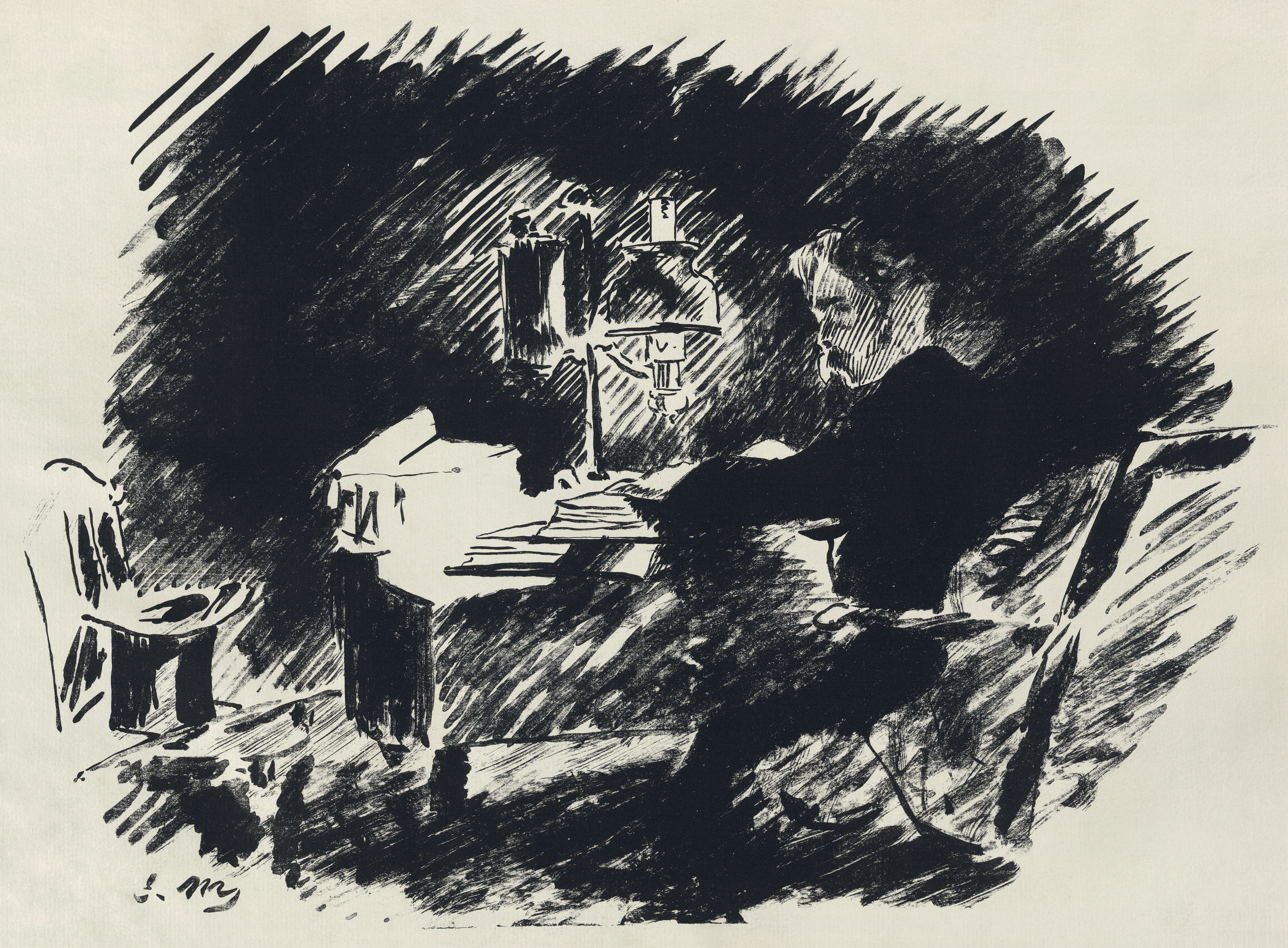
An illustration by Édouard Manet, from Mallarmé's translation, depicting the first two lines of the poem

Later publications of "The Raven" included artwork by well-known illustrators. Notably, in 1858 "The Raven" appeared in a British Poe anthology with illustrations by John Tenniel, the Alice in Wonderland illustrator (The Poetical Works of Edgar Allan Poe: With Original Memoir, London: Sampson Low). "The Raven" was published independently with lavish woodcuts by Gustave Doré in 1884 (New York: Harper & Brothers). Doré died before its publication. In 1875, a French edition with English and French text, Le Corbeau, was published with lithographs by Édouard Manet and translation by the symbolist poet Stéphane Mallarmé. Many 20th-century artists and contemporary illustrators created artworks and illustrations based on "The Raven", including Edmund Dulac, István Orosz, and Ryan Price.

== Composition ==
Poe capitalized on the success of "The Raven" by following it up with his essay "The Philosophy of Composition" (1846), in which he detailed the poem's creation. His description of its writing is probably exaggerated, though the essay serves as an important overview of Poe's literary theory. He explains that every component of the poem is based on logic: the raven enters the chamber to avoid a storm (the "midnight dreary" in the "bleak December"), and its perch on a pallid white bust was to create visual contrast against the dark black bird. No aspect of the poem was an accident, he claims, but is based on total control by the author. Even the term "Nevermore", he says, is used because of the effect created by the long vowel sounds (though Poe may have been inspired to use the word by the works of Lord Byron or Henry Wadsworth Longfellow). Poe had experimented with the long o sound throughout many other poems: "no more" in "Silence", "evermore" in "The Conqueror Worm". The topic itself, Poe says, was chosen because "the death ... of a beautiful woman is unquestionably the most poetical topic in the world." Told from "the lips ... of a bereaved lover" is best suited to achieve the desired effect. Beyond the poetics of it, the lost Lenore may have been inspired by events in Poe's own life as well, either to the early loss of his mother, Eliza Poe, or the long illness endured by his wife, Virginia. Ultimately, Poe considered "The Raven" an experiment to "suit at once the popular and critical taste", accessible to both the mainstream and high literary worlds. It is unknown how long Poe worked on "The Raven"; speculation ranges from a single day to ten years. Poe recited a poem believed to be an early version with an alternate ending of "The Raven" in 1843 in Saratoga, New York. An early draft may have featured an owl.

In the summer of 1844, when the poem was likely written, Poe, his wife, and mother-in-law were boarding at the farmhouse of Patrick Brennan in New York. The location of the house, which was demolished in 1888, has been a disputed point and, while there are two different plaques marking its supposed location on West 84th Street, it most likely stood where 206 West 84th Street is now.

== Critical reception ==
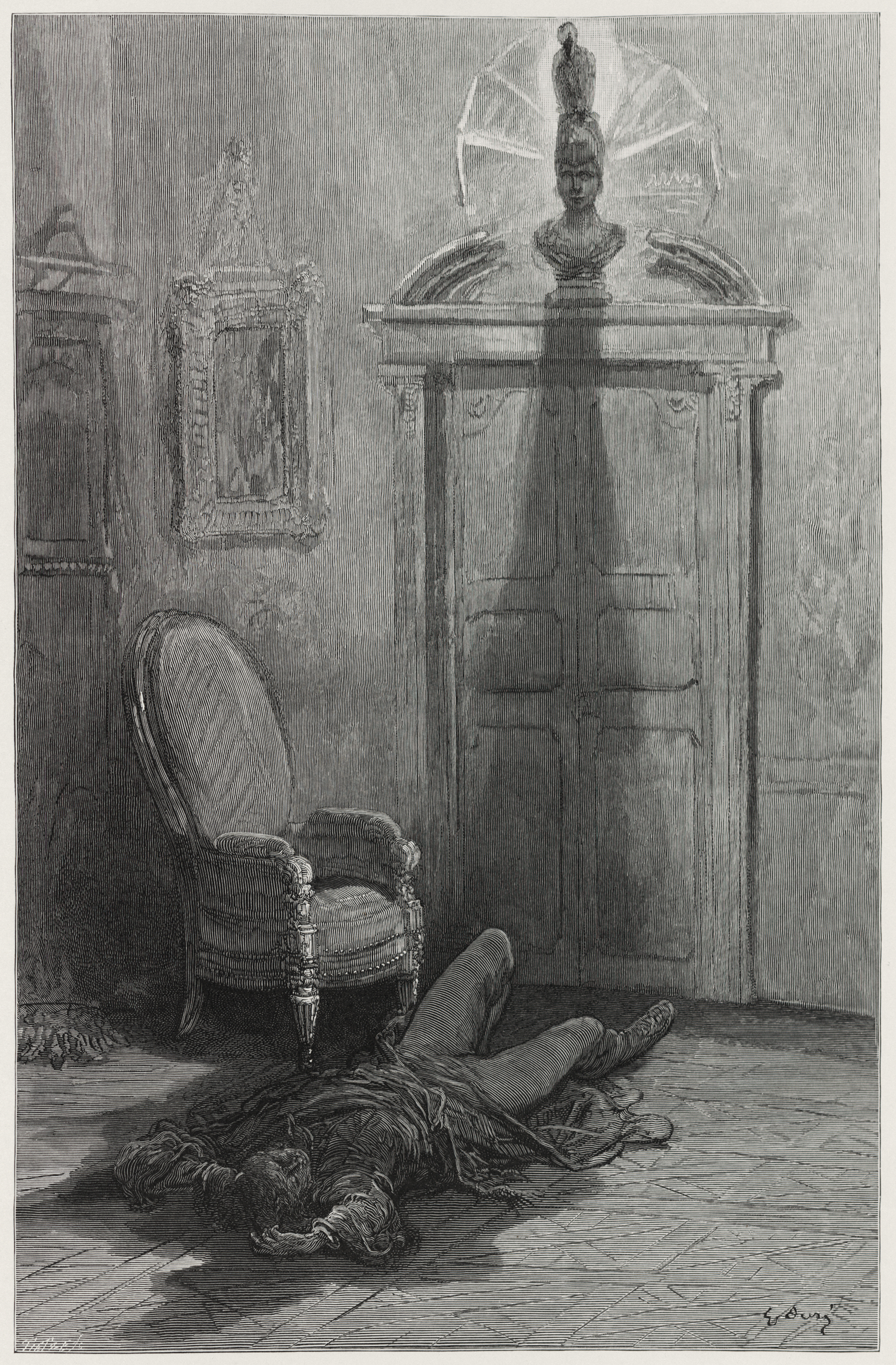
Gustave Doré's illustration of the final lines of the poem accompanies the phrase "And my soul from out that shadow that lies floating on the floor/Shall be lifted—nevermore!"

In part due to its dual printing, "The Raven" made Edgar Allan Poe a household name almost immediately, and turned Poe into a national celebrity. Readers began to identify poem with poet, earning Poe the nickname "The Raven". The poem was soon widely reprinted, imitated, and parodied. Though it made Poe popular in his day, it did not bring him significant financial success. As he later lamented, "I have made no money. I am as poor now as ever I was in my life—except in hope, which is by no means bankable".

The New World said, "Everyone reads the Poem and praises it ... justly, we think, for it seems to us full of originality and power." The Pennsylvania Inquirer reprinted it with the heading "A Beautiful Poem". Elizabeth Barrett wrote to Poe, "Your 'Raven' has produced a sensation, a fit o' horror, here in England. Some of my friends are taken by the fear of it and some by the music. I hear of persons haunted by 'Nevermore'." Poe's popularity resulted in invitations to recite "The Raven" and to lecture—in public and at private social gatherings. At one literary salon, a guest noted, "to hear [Poe] repeat the Raven ... is an event in one's life." It was recalled by someone who experienced it, "He would turn down the lamps till the room was almost dark, then standing in the center of the apartment he would recite ... in the most melodious of voices ... So marvelous was his power as a reader that the auditors would be afraid to draw breath lest the enchanted spell be broken."

Parodies sprang up especially in Boston, New York, and Philadelphia and included "The Craven" by "Poh!", "The Gazelle", "The Whippoorwill", and "The Turkey". One parody, "The Pole-Cat", caught the attention of Andrew Johnston, a lawyer who sent it on to Abraham Lincoln. Though Lincoln admitted he had "several hearty laughs", he had not, at that point, read "The Raven". However, Lincoln eventually read and memorized the poem.

"The Raven" was praised by fellow writers William Gilmore Simms and Margaret Fuller, though it was denounced by William Butler Yeats, who called it "insincere and vulgar ... its execution a rhythmical trick". Transcendentalist Ralph Waldo Emerson said, "I see nothing in it." A critic for the Southern Quarterly Review wrote in July 1848 that the poem was ruined by "a wild and unbridled extravagance" and that minor things like a tapping at the door and a fluttering curtain would only affect "a child who had been frightened to the verge of idiocy by terrible ghost stories". An anonymous writer going by the pseudonym "Outis" (Ancient Greek for "Nobody", the false name Odysseus gives to Polyphemus in Odyssey) suggested in the New York Evening Mirror that "The Raven" was plagiarized from a poem called "The Bird of the Dream" by an unnamed author. The writer, who wrote the article as a response to Poe's accusations of plagiarism against Henry Wadsworth Longfellow, showed 18 similarities between the poems. It has been suggested Outis was really Cornelius Conway Felton, if not Poe himself. After Poe's death, his friend Thomas Holley Chivers said "The Raven" was plagiarized from one of his poems. In particular, he claimed to have been the inspiration for the meter of the poem as well as the refrain "nevermore".

"The Raven" became one of the most popular targets for literary translators in Hungary; more than a dozen poets rendered it into Hungarian, including Mihály Babits, Dezső Kosztolányi, Árpád Tóth, and György Faludy. Balázs Birtalan wrote its paraphrasis from the raven's point of view.

== Legacy ==
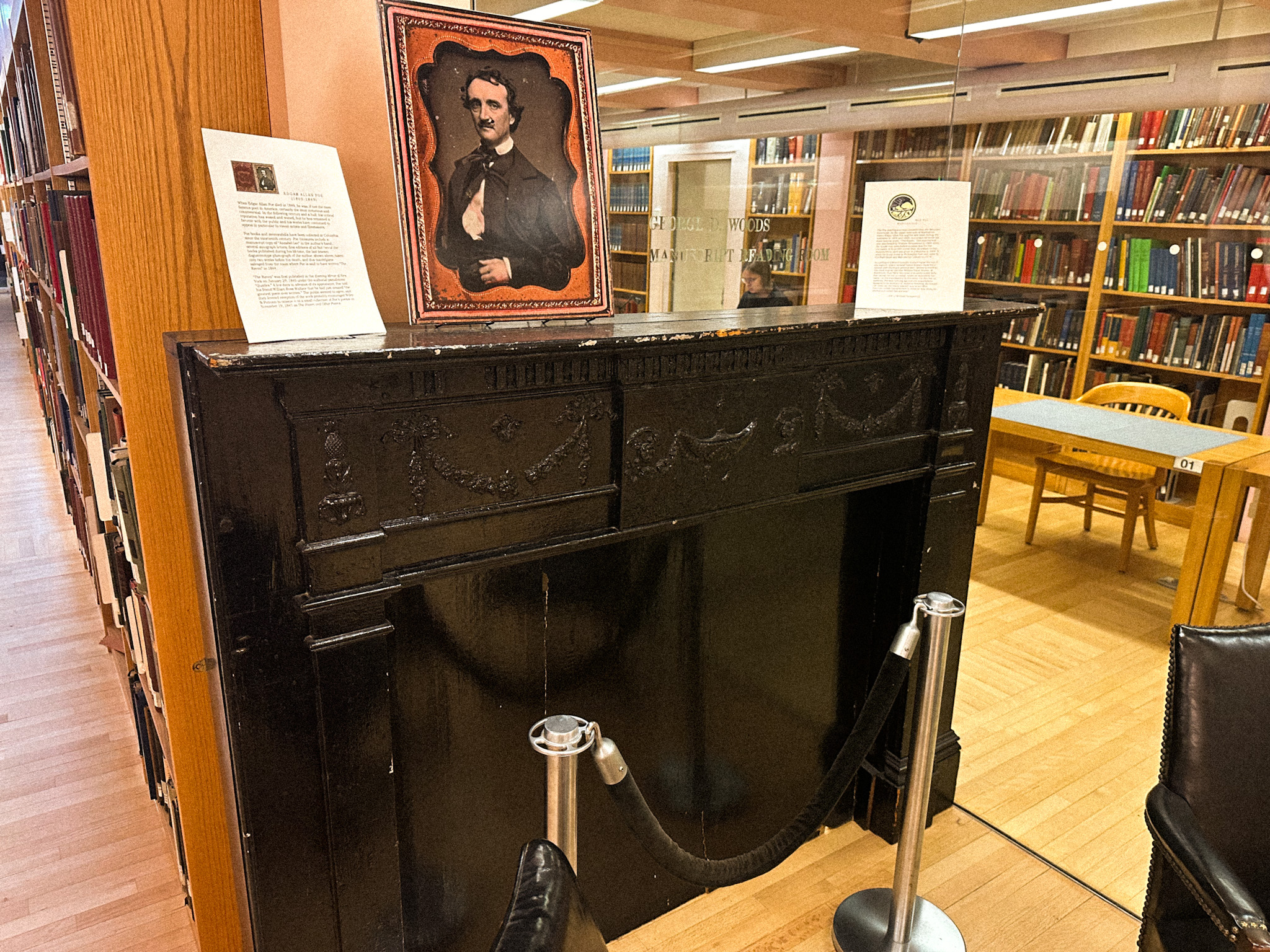
Mantel from the Brennan Farmhouse, known as the Raven Mantel, at Columbia University

"The Raven" has influenced many modern works, including Vladimir Nabokov's Lolita in 1955, Bernard Malamud's "The Jewbird" in 1963 and Ray Bradbury's "The Parrot Who Met Papa" in 1976. The process by which Poe composed "The Raven" influenced a number of French authors and composers, such as Charles Baudelaire and Maurice Ravel, and it has been suggested that Ravel's Boléro may have been deeply influenced by "The Philosophy of Composition".

The name of the Baltimore Ravens, a professional American football team, was inspired by the poem. Chosen in a fan contest that drew 33,288 voters, the allusion honors Poe, who spent the early part of his career in Baltimore and is buried there.

The mantel of the room in which Poe penned "The Raven" was removed and donated to Columbia University before the demolition of the Brennan Farmhouse. It currently resides at the Rare Book & Manuscript Library, on the sixth floor of Butler Library.

== See also ==
- Allusions to Poe's "The Raven"
- Cultural depictions of ravens
- "Lenore", an earlier poem by Poe
- Mortimer and Arabel, a book series by Joan Aiken and a literary nod to "The Raven"
