= Tamerlane (poem) =

1827 poem by Edgar Allan Poe

- by Edgar Allan Poe
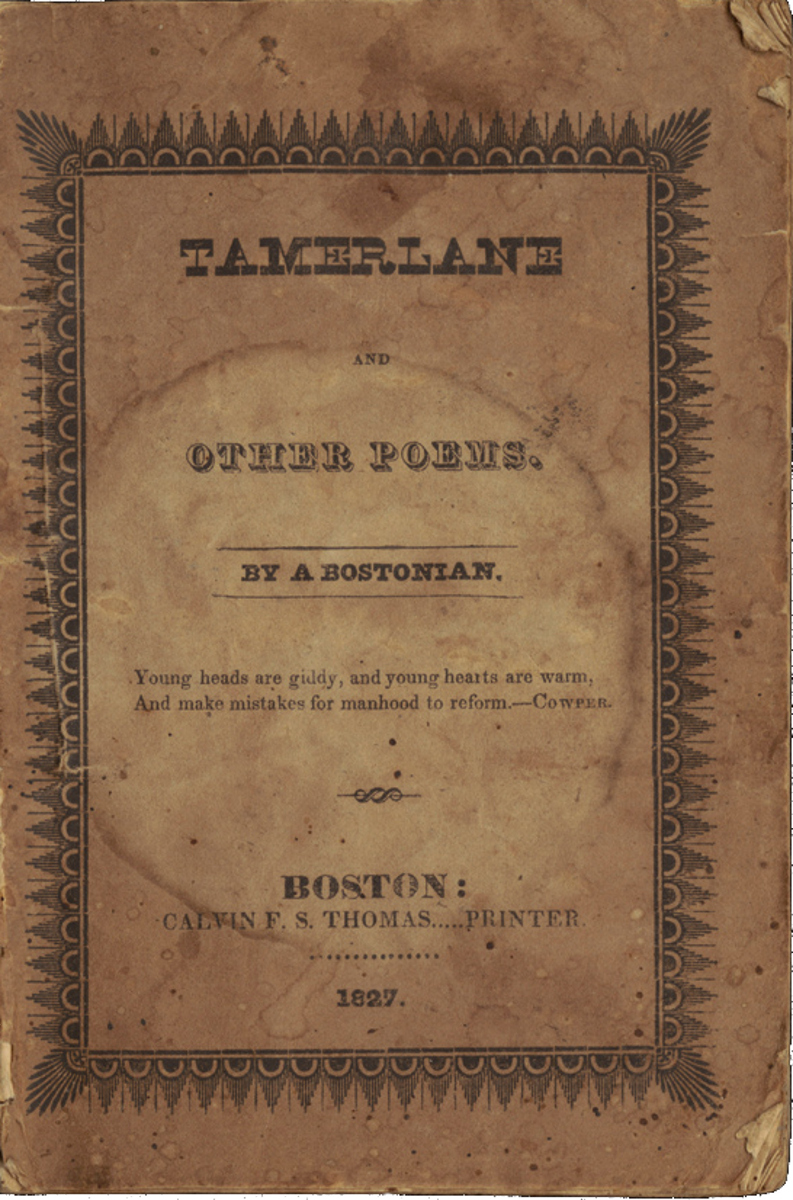
- Original cover of Tamerlane and Other Poems, in which Tamerlane first appeared
- First published in: Tamerlane and Other Poems
- Publication date: 1827
- Lines: 403 (later trimmed to 223)

Full text
- Tamerlane at Wikisource

Tamerlane is a poem by Edgar Allan Poe. It is a fictionalized account of the life of the Turco-Mongol conqueror Tamerlane. The poem was first published in the 1827 collection Tamerlane and Other Poems. That collection, with only 50 copies printed, was not credited with the author's real name but by "A Bostonian". The poem's original version was 403 lines but trimmed down to 223 lines for its inclusion in Al Aaraaf, Tamerlane, and Minor Poems.

== Synopsis ==
The poem follows the life of Tamerlane, the 14th-century warlord who founded the Timurid Empire, though the poem is not a historical depiction of his life.

Tamerlane ignores the young love he has for a peasant in order to achieve power. On his deathbed, he regrets this decision to create "a kingdom [in exchange] for a broken heart". The peasant is named Ada in most of Poe's original version of the poem, though it is removed and re-added throughout its many revised versions. The name "Ada" is likely a reference to Ada Lovelace, the daughter of Lord Byron, a renowned poet whom Poe admired. In fact, the line "I reach'd my home — my home no more" echoes a line in Byron's work Don Juan.

== Analysis ==
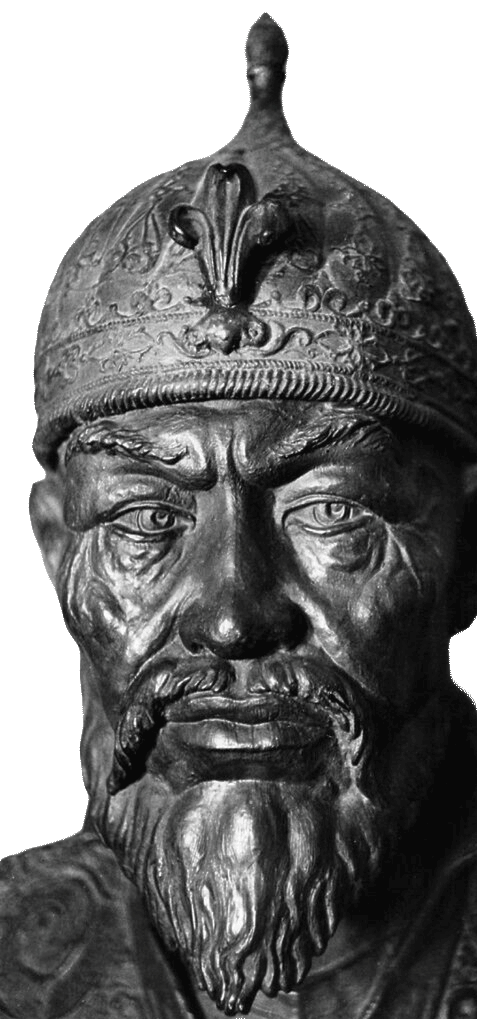
"Tamerlane" is the Latinized name of a 14th-century historical figure.

The main themes of Tamerlane are independence and pride as well as loss and exile. Poe may have written the poem based on his own loss of his early love, Sarah Elmira Royster, his birth mother Eliza Poe, or his foster-mother Frances Allan. The poem may also mirror Poe's relationship with his foster-father John Allan; similar to Poe, Tamerlane is of uncertain parentage, with a "feigned name". Only 17 when he wrote the poem, Poe's own sense of loss came from the waning possibility of inheritance and a college education after leaving the University of Virginia. Distinctly a poem of youth, the poem also discusses themes Poe would use throughout his life, including his tendency toward self-criticism and his ongoing strivings towards perfection.

The poem was influenced by Lord Byron's drama Manfred and his poem The Giaour in both manner and style.

Poe may have first heard of Timur in July 1822 as a young man in Richmond, Virginia. A horse-spectacle called Timour the Tartar was staged at the Richmond Theatre and repeated in October. Some Poe scholars speculate Poe was in attendance or at least heard of the show.

Poe may have identified with the title character. He used "TAMERLANE" as a pseudonym attached to two of his poems on their first publication, "Fanny" and "To ——", both published in the Baltimore Saturday Visiter in 1833.

Christopher Marlowe's play Tamburlaine is also a story about a Scythian shepherd who falls in love with Zenocrate and conquers most of Asia, Europe, and Africa.

== Publication history ==
Tamerlane was first published in Poe's earliest poetry collection, Tamerlane and Other Poems. The "little volume", as Poe referred to it in the preface, consists of 10 poems. This original version of the poem contained 406 lines. In an 1845 publication, it had been edited to only 234. Tamerlane and Other Poems, which appeared in June 1827, was forty pages long and credited only by "a Bostonian".

In its initial publication in the collection Tamerlane and Other Poems, Poe included endnotes explaining some of his allusions from Tamerlane. He also confesses early on that he knows little about the historical Tamerlane, "and with that little, I have taken the full liberty of a poet." These endnotes do not appear in any other collection that includes Tamerlane.

In 1829, between the poem's first and second publications, Poe sent it along with "Al Aaraaf" for review by influential critic John Neal in his magazine The Yankee. In recognition of Neal's encouragement, Poe expressed desire to dedicate Al Aaraaf, Tamerlane, and Minor Poems to him, but Neal insisted such a dedication would be an injury to both Poe and the publication. Poe instead dedicated just "Tamerlane" within the volume to Neal.
