= Elias Marks =

South Carolina educator (1790–1886)

- Portrait of Elias Marks
- Born: December 2, 1790; Charleston, South Carolina, U.S.
- Died: June 22, 1886 (aged 95); Washington, D.C., U.S.
- Resting place: Oak Hill Cemetery
- Education: M.D., College of Physicians and Surgeons (1815)
- Occupations: physician; educator; writer; poet
- Known for: Founder of South Carolina Female Collegiate Institute at Barhamville
- Spouses: Jane Barham (m. 1816-1827); Julia Pierpont Warne (m. 1832-1878)
- Children: 4 by Jane Barham; 6 by Julia Pierpont Warne

Elias Marks (December 2, 1790 – June 22, 1886) founded the South Carolina Female Collegiate Institute at Barhamville, South Carolina. The girls' school flourished for over 30 years in the antebellum period, pioneering in higher education for young women. Marks was born in Charleston and earned an M.D. at the College of Physicians and Surgeons in New York City. He soon switched from medicine to a career in female education. Marks published writings on medical and educational themes as well as a book of poems. He "was esteemed by all as a scholar and a gentleman."

== Early life and education ==
Marks was born in Charleston, South Carolina in 1790. His parents, Humphrey and Frances Marks, had come from Lancashire, England in 1783 and worshipped at Kahal Kadosh Beth Elohim Synagogue in Charleston. The Marks family was in a group of Jews "invited to Carolina by the indigo and rice planters ... to invest money in mortgages on plantations along the seaboard." He likely received his early education at one of several private schools run by Jews in Charleston. The family owned a store in Columbia and lived above it. (Note: Elias's brother Alexander was arrested for violating the blue law. Alexander was selling goods on Sunday, after observing the Jewish Sabbath on Saturday.) Marks converted to Christianity early in life, after being inspired by the Methodist faith of his African American nurse. He attended the College of Physicians and Surgeons in New York City and graduated in 1815 as a medical doctor.

== New York after medical school ==
After graduation from medical school, Marks conducted "a drug store in New York City for a few years." He was "for a time associated in practice with Dr. Valentine Mott", a prominent New York surgeon.

He published his inaugural dissertation in 1815. It reviews the mind-stomach connection and is "as much a study in psychology as it was in physiology." (Note: Marks frequently quotes Latin and French, so was probably knowledgeable in those languages.)

Marks married Jane Barham (1788–1827) in 1816. Born in Lincolnshire England, she was a Christian and "a teacher who shared his commitment to the development of women's intellectual abilities."

In 1817, Marks published an English translation of the aphorisms of Hippocrates, based on a Latin text. It is dedicated to the South Carolina botanist Stephen Elliot, who had an intellectual circle in Charleston.

He belonged to the Physio-Medical Society and gave a speech to them on the "sophistication of medical theory" in 1817. This speech was published in a 15-page booklet.

== Medical and educational career in Columbia S.C. ==
In 1819, Marks and his wife returned to South Carolina but to Columbia instead of Charleston. During the 1820s, his parents and brother also moved to Columbia. (Note: Marks' parents and brother Alexander opened Marks Porter and Relish House in Columbia. It offered the "best wines and Liquors" as well as a reading room with newspapers "to which gentlemen from the country and also members of the legislature" could have "free and uninterrupted access.") (Note: Elias's brother, Dr. Frederick Marks, opened a medical practice in Columbia. Frederick graduated from Univ. of Penn. medical school in 1823.) "Columbia's early Jews found a warm reception in their new town. Many Jews, including ... educator Dr. Elias Marks ... were viewed by their neighbors as important people with powerful connections."

Elias and Jane worshiped at Trinity Episcopal Church in Columbia. He and Jane "soon became aware of an urgent need in this state (SC) for the higher education of women." They became principals at Columbia Female Academy by 1821. Jane and Elias had four children before she died in 1827. (Note: Jane and three of their children are buried in the DeLeon section of the Hebrew Benevolent Society Cemetery in Columbia with a cenotaph at Trinity Episcopal Church.) None of Jane's children survived to adulthood.

Marks continued his involvement with the medical profession for a while, giving an 1821 speech to the Medical Board of Columbia SC. The Medical Board published the speech as a 7-page pamphlet "Discourse on the progress of medical science".

In 1826, he asked the S. C. legislature to fund an institution of higher learning for young women. The proposal was considered inexpedient, so he decided to undertake "singly ... that, which was deemed inexpedient for the many". He proceeded to open the South Carolina Female Institute in 1828 without support from the government or a church organization. "Very probably this was the first women's college in the South."

While formally named the "South Carolina Female Institute" in 1828, the school was often casually called the "Barhamville Institute/School/Academy/College/Female Seminary" or simply "Barhamville." The South Carolina government agreed in 1835 to elevate the school's title to "Collegiate Institute", making it the "South Carolina Female Collegiate Institute." At that time, the formal title of "College" was restricted to institutions for male students.

The Barhamville Institute was often praised over the years. "Few southern institutions received as much recognition as the ... Institute." It was the "best girls' school in the South, so it would seem". "... it was the first and only school of its character at the South. It was of a very high class ..."

Marks published the first edition of "Hints on Female Education" in 1828. In it, Marks argued that "men and women were equal in intellectual gifts but that those gifts found different expression." He makes a Christian argument that female education is necessary for "enlarging and strengthening the moral and intellectual faculty" of women. There must have been significant interest in the book because it went through two more editions in 1837 and 1851 with substantial changes in each re-issue. His educational philosophy was influenced by Johann Heinrich Pestalozzi, Richard Lovell Edgeworth, and Maria Edgeworth.

In 1829, Marks announced that the Institute had hired Mrs. Julia Ann Pierpont Warne (1793–1878), principal of a girls' school at Sparta, Georgia. She was a Christian and the still-young widow of attorney Richard Henry Warne, who died in 1824. (Note: Julia's brother-in-law was Vermont Governor Richard Skinner.) Julia was trained by the feminist educator Emma Willard, founder of the first school for women's higher education. Like Jane, Julia was deeply committed to women's education and was described as "of deep religious feeling—hospitable, generous, dignified." Marks and Julia married in 1832. "The credit for Barhamville's success should be shared almost equally by the two of them." Elias and Julia had six children. (Note: Edwina Pierpont Chamberlin and Edward John Marks lived into the 20th century and were sources for Henry C. Davis (1879-1951), the professor at the University of South Carolina who wrote Elias' entry in the Dictionary of American Biography.)

Marks published various educational materials, such as his "Questions Analytically Adapted", which was written as a supplement to Samuel Whelpley's history textbook.

== South Carolina Female Collegiate Institute at Barhamville ==
Southeast View of Barhamville Institute

Marks selected a location with over 500 acres two miles outside of Columbia for his new school and named it "Barhamville" after his deceased first wife Jane. The spot was selected because the sandhills there were considered healthier than downtown Columbia and it was distant from the distractions of the town. "The house was situated on an elevated knoll in the pine woods, surrounded by a beautiful drive and gardens in a state of high cultivation." The main building had a three-story center structure with a cellar and wings off to each side. The North wing was made of wood, three stories high with a basement of brick. The South wing was all brick and two stories high with a cellar. There were stand-alone structures for the chemistry lab, teacher housing, and the like. Marks and his wife lived in the central building, which had an entrance hall complete with African American butler and "a broad, circular stairway with mahogany balustrades." The student dormitories and classrooms were in the wings.

The Institute had upper and lower chapels. Each year there would be a different chaplain, rotating among the Protestant denominations of the South. Church attendance was mandatory. The Barhamville Institute was not connected to or supported by any particular denomination.

Front View of Barhamville Institute

There were two or four girls in each bedroom with curtains partitioning the room. The students ordinarily wore "hoop skirts, kid slippers with flat heels, long tightly laced corsets, and cotton dresses." They would switch to silk dresses with cashmere or silk shawls for more formal events. Exercise was mostly confined to walking and practicing quadrilles. Students received visitors in the parlor or library; rules forbade any male visitors other than relatives such as brothers and cousins.

Marks sought out top-notch teachers, often from Europe or Northern states, and paid them well. Eugene Dovilliers and Sophie Sosnowski were among the teachers. The students came mostly from South Carolina and mostly from the wealthy planter class. Among the prominent students were Anna Maria Calhoun Clemson (daughter of John C. Calhoun), Martha Bulloch Roosevelt (mother of Theodore Roosevelt), Elizabeth Allston Pringle (daughter of S.C. Governor Robert Allston), and Theresa Jones (wife of Dr. J. Marion Sims). Ann Pamela Cunningham, another student, founded the Mount Vernon Ladies' Association, which rescued George Washington's home.

Enrollment fluctuated between 100 and 200 students. Board and tuition were $200 in the 1850s (equivalent to $6,900 in 2025) for a collegiate year, but the optional fees could raise that considerably.

Marks' circular for the school dated 1855-1856 shows the curriculum. There was a preparatory year and then four years of collegiate classes. The classes included mathematics (arithmetic, algebra, geometry), sciences (botany, mineralogy, chemistry, astronomy), history (ancient and modern), philosophy (natural, intellectual, and moral) and literature. Literature was taken seriously. "Don't read light fiction, he (Marks) warned his hearers; cultivate your literary taste; nurse your spiritual welfare."

Insignia of Barhamville Institute

Around 1847, the school published several issues of the Barhamville Register, "perhaps the earliest literary publications by an educational institution for women." "The important thing about The Barhamville Register is not that the verse was poor or that its essays lacked originality but that it existed at all."

Drawing, painting, music, and languages (French, Italian, Latin, and Spanish) were available as optional courses. The music classes and performances were particularly important.

It was not solely intellectual work running Barhamville Institute. On one occasion, Marks used his shotgun to chase away disruptive students who arrived at Barhamville from a nearby male college. He slightly wounded one student with a shotgun pellet. The student's flintlock misfired when he attempted to return fire on Marks. On at least two occasions, Marks advertised for the return of runaway slaves. Another time he did damage control in the newspaper after rumors spread of an affair between two staff members. The Barhamville school term ended early in 1854 when a student died of typhoid, the first student death at the school in 18 years. Marks grew mulberry trees on the Barhamville property for the Southern silkworm industry during the M. multicaulis craze of the 1830s.

The insignia of the South Carolina Female Collegiate Institute (SCFCI) combined a six-pointed star and a triangle. (Note: The star and triangle may have represented a synthesis of the Jewish Star of David and the Christian doctrine of the Trinity. (The Marks family belonged to Trinity Episcopal Church.)) The Latin motto was "Qualem decet esse sororum", "Such as sisters ought to be". It was a quote from the Metamorphoses of Ovid, book 2.

== The End of Barhamville Institute ==
By 1861, Marks entered his seventies and retired back to Columbia. Marks still owned Bahramville. Acelie Togno, who had been running a school in Columbia, leased the school from Marks in June 1862 and ran it for two years. Then Sophie Sosnowski took over the management of Barhamville. (Note: Sophie Sosnowski was born and married into elite German and Polish social circles, emigrated to America, studied with Emma Willard, and had a long career in education, particularly in Georgia.)

The American Civil War began in April 1861. The Jews of South Carolina shifted their allegiance from the nation to the state as the Civil War approached. "Except in religion, the Jews differed very little from other white residents of the city.” "On the critical issue of slavery, they were supporters ..." From 1830 to 1860, Marks typically owned 10 to 20 slaves. He wrote lyrics for music dedicated to the "patriotic ladies of the Southern Confederated States".

In 1865 Union General Sherman's army marched from Savannah towards Virginia in the Campaign of the Carolinas. Confederate scouts reported that the Union Army was heading for Columbia. Marks in Columbia worked with Sosnowski in Barhamville to get the last group of female students sent Upcountry before the Union Army arrived. Civil order deteriorated in Columbia as the Union Army approached and the Confederate Army withdrew. During the Union occupation from 17 to 20 February, a third of Columbia was destroyed by a series of fires. (Note: The house of Elias' brother, Dr. Frederick Marks, was destroyed during the Union occupation.)

The Union Army provided guards for certain non-military buildings during the brief occupation. Marks was able to get guards assigned to Barhamville for protection against drunken, ill-intentioned soldiers and civilians. The exhausted guards made little effort except for one diligent Union soldier, a Tennessean who found that he had a mutual acquaintance with Sosnowski. Sosnowski used her late husband's Masonic materials to acquire aid from some Union officers. On the last night, a passing unit of "warm hearted" Irish American soldiers assisted Sosnowski in protecting the school from marauders. Marks' Barhamville Institute still stood when the Union Army moved on although some valuables were stolen.

The 1865 defeat of the Confederacy wrecked the Southern economy. "One-fourth of the Confederate army was killed by war or disease; the basis of wealth, slaves, was eliminated by emancipation." Few planters could afford to send their daughters to an expensive school. Marks and his family lived on the property from 1865 to 1867 while the school was operated by Angela Torriani, a refugee from the destruction of Charleston. The school closed after decades of educational success.

In 1866, Marks recorded a sharecropping agreement with the Freedmen's Bureau in Columbia. Marks attended a 1867 Columbia meeting where Governor Orr and Union officers talked with the newly freed African Americans about their participation in governance. The newspaper account says the tone of the meeting was "hopeful and harmonious."

Later in 1867, Marks moved North with his family. (Note: Elias' brother, Dr. Frederick Marks, and many of his descendants remained in Columbia after Elias left.) A former slave was hired as caretaker of the property. There was a "proposal to purchase Barhamville for the school for the daughters of fallen Confederate soldiers." The main building was destroyed in an accidental fire on 18 February 1869. Marks had an offer of $20,000 from New York just before the fire. (Note: Marks had declared total assets of $65,000 in the census of 1860, just before the war started.) It lost much value and was a devastating loss because Marks hoped to leave the money to his daughter Edwina.

All of the Barhamville Institute buildings are gone. (Note: The "Barhamville Estate" housing development occupies the site.) A historical marker about a half mile east of the site commemorates Marks' school. (Note: The historical marker is on the southwest corner of the intersection between Two Notch Road (Rt.1) and McFadden Street.)

== Poetry ==
The prominent Southern writer William Gilmore Simms "seems to have regarded Marks highly as a poet", but there is no evidence of them meeting personally.

Marks wrote many unpublished poems, often for use at student events. He published a book of poetry in 1850: "Elfreide of Guldal ... and Other Poems" under the pen name of "Marks of Barhamville".

The largest poem in the collection, "Elfreide of Guldal", is a "bland enough narrative of heroic doings amongst the Norsemen.” The eponymous maiden loyally chooses to protect her community rather than accept the queenship of the invaders. It is written in the style of John Milton, using blank verse. The following poem "Semael" is a "mystical effusion in a Levantine setting".

Another prominent poem in the book, "Maia; a Mask", has "sufficient charm and grace to invite comparison with Milton's poem Comus ... It was the sort of thing that Marks and Barhamville could do well—dainty, unpretentious and restrained." Other poems in the book are "short mediocre verse of an autobiographic nature and lame expressions of assorted noble sentiments."

George Pope Morris "praised the work highly and published lengthy extracts from it in the Home Journal, of New York.”

== Last years ==
During the winter of 1868–1869, Marks and his wife lived with their daughter Edwina at the Mount Vernon estate of George Washington. Edwina was employed as secretary to Ann Pamela Cunningham and her Mount Vernon Ladies' Association, which was working to preserve Mount Vernon. Cunningham was a former student at Barhamville. Marks found the "solitude, monotony, and absence of books" intolerable, so Edwina took her parents back to Washington, D.C. Edwina worked as a Treasury clerk to support her parents after the financial devastation of Barhamville. Cunningham would stay with the Marks family when she was on lobbying trips to Washington, D.C.

Marks died on 22 June 1886. He and his wife Julia are buried in Oak Hill Cemetery (Washington, D.C.).

Elias and Julia were among the 19th century pioneers in female education whose "courage and foresight ... should not be forgotten."

== Writings ==
- Marks, Elias (1815). Conjectural inquiry into the relative influence of the mind and stomach. New York: Van Winkle & Wiley.
- Marks, Elias (1817a). A discourse on the sophistication of medical theory. New York: Collins & Co.
- Marks, Elias (1817b). The aphorisms of Hippocrates. New York: Collins.
- Marks, Elias (1821). Discourse on the progress of medical science read by appointment before the medical board at Columbia at their annual session. Columbia S.C.: State Gazette office.
- Marks, Elias (1825). Questions analytically adapted to Dr. Samuel Whelpley's compend of history. Columbia S.C.: Black & Sweeny.
- Marks, Elias; Tyler, W.H. (1841). Catalogue of the S.C. Female Institute at Barhamville. Columbia S.C.: I.C.Morgan.
- Marks, Elias (1845). Course of instruction adopted in The South Carolina Female Institute at Barhamville. Columbia S.C.: I.C. Morgan's Letter Press Print.
- Marks, Elias (1849). Preliminary discourse to a course of lectures on belles lettres. Columbia S.C.: Johnston & Cavis.
- Marks, Elias (1850). Elfreide of Guldal, a scandinavian legend; and other poems. New York: D. Appleton and Company.
- Marks, Elias (1851) [1828]. Hints on female education. Columbia S.C.: A.S. Johnston.
- Marks, Elias; Hatschek, Alexander (1861). Chicora, The Original Name of Carolina. Philadelphia: T. Sinclair's Lith. LCCN 2008661625.

== Sources ==
- Bailey, Candace Lea (2010). Music and the Southern Belle. Carbondale: Southern Illinois Univ. Press. pp. 81–89. ISBN 978-0809329601.
- Blandin, I. M. E. (1975) [1909]. History of higher education of women in the South prior to 1860. New York: The Neale Pub. Co. pp. 264–276. ISBN 9780892010240.
- Cohen, Hennig (1959). A Barhamville Miscellany. Columbia SC: The R.L. Bryan Co.
- Davidson, James Wood (9 May 1867). "Contributorial". Yorkville Enquirer. York S.C. pp. 2–3.
- Davidson, James Wood (1869). The living writers of the South. New York: Carleton. pp. 368–369.
- Davis, Henry C. (1995). Johnson, Allen (ed.). Dictionary of American Biography. Vol. 6. New York: Schribner's. p. 289. ISBN 0-684-14143-4.
- Elzas, Barnett Abraham (1911). The Jewish cemeteries of South Carolina. Charleston S.C. p. 54.
- Fackenthal, Frank Diehl (1932). Columbia university alumni register, 1754-1931. New York: Columbia University Press. p. 559.
- Farnham, Christie Anne (1994). The Education of the Southern Belle. New York: NYU press. pp. 65–67. ISBN 0814726151.
- Gergel, Belinda F. (1996). "The Israelites of Columbia, South Carolina: The Development of an Antebellum Jewish Community". Proceedings of the South Carolina Historical Association: 37–44.
- Gergel, Belinda F. (14 September 2016). "Barhamville Academy". South Carolina Encyclopedia. Univ. of S.C.
- Hagy, James William (1993). This Happy Land - The Jews of Colonial and Antebellum Charleston. Tuscaloosa Alabama: University of Alabama Press. ISBN 0-8173-0576-9.
- Hargrett, Lester; Sosnowski, Sophia Wentz (September 1924). "Burning of Columbia". Georgia Historical Quarterly. 8 (3): 195–214. JSTOR 40575788.
- Holcomb, Brent H. (1985). South Carolina Naturalizations 1783-1850. Baltimore MD: Clearfield Co. p. 82. ISBN 0806311010.
- Landry, David (6 May 2013). "History of Silk Production, The M. multicaulis Craze". Mansfield Historical Society. "The culture of M. multicaulis was promoted by Congress and soon growers up and down the Atlantic Coast were caught up in a wild speculation that rivaled the "Tulip Bulb Craze" in 17th century Holland."
- Lucas, Marion Brunson (2000) [1976]. Sherman and the burning of Columbia. College Station: Texas A&M Univ. Press. pp. 113–114. ISBN 9781570033582.
- Marcus, Jacob Rader (2018). United States Jewry 1776-1985. Vol. 1. Detroit MI: Wayne State University Press. pp. 408–409. ISBN 978-0814321867.
- Pettus, Louise; Chepesiuk, Ron (20 September 1987). "Barhamville Female Academy first S.C. college for women". The Index-Journal. Greenwood S.C. p. 26.
- Rembert, Sarah H. (February 1970). Wilkins, Robert Pearce (ed.). "Barhamville, A Columbia Antebellum Girls' School". S.C. History Illustrated. Vol. 1, no. 1. Columbia S.C.: Sandlapper Press. ISSN 0038-3090.
- Selby, Julian A (1905). Memorabilia and Anecdotal Reminiscences of Columbia, S. C. Columbia SC: R.L.Bryan Co. p. 126.
- Sims, James Marion (1884). The Story of my life. New York: D. Appleton.
- Thane, Elswyth (1966). Mount Vernon is ours. New York: Duell, Sloan and Pearce.
- Towles, Louis P. (1996). A World Turned Upside Down. Columbia S.C.: University of South Carolina Press. p. 554. ISBN 1570030472.
- Wauchope, George Armstrong (1910). The writers of South Carolina. Columbia S.C.: S.C. State Co. pp. 291–295.
- White, Mary Harriet (September 1966). "Madame Sophie Sosnowski, Educator Of Young Ladies". The Georgia Historical Quarterly. 50 (3): 283–287. JSTOR 40578624.
- Witherspoon, Jean H. (15 March 1903). "Dr. Marks and the Barhamville School". The State. Columbia S.C. p. 2.
- "A Reasonable Reward". Charleston Daily Courier. Charleston S.C. 10 July 1844. p. 3.
- "Barhamville Institute for sale". The Farmer's Register. Vol. 6, no. 12. Petersburg VA: Edmund Ruffin. 1838. p. 770.
- "Burial Records M". Oak Hill Cemetery (Washington, D.C.). The Oak Hill Cemetery Historic Preservation Foundation. 2020.
- Catalogue of the medical graduates of the University of Pennsylvania with an historical sketch. Philadelphia: Lydia R. Bailey. 1839. p. 49.
- "Elias Marks 1830 Census", United States census, 1830; Columbia, Richland, SC; roll 19_171, page 789–790, line 4. Retrieved on 9 August 2025.
- "Elias Marks 1840 Census", United States census, 1840; Columbia, Richland, SC; roll M704_453, page 917–918, line 1. Retrieved on 9 August 2025.
- "Elias Marks 1850 Census, Schedule 2", United States census, 1850; Columbia, Richland, SC; roll 432_867, page 199–200, line 28. Retrieved on 9 August 2025.
- "Elias Marks 1860 Census, Schedule 2", United States census, 1860; Columbia, Richland, SC; roll 653_1237, page 263, line 1. Retrieved on 9 August 2025.
- "Health of Barhamville". The Independent Press. Abbeville, SC. 10 June 1854. p. 2.
- "Index of Persons Buried at our Cemetery". Cemetery in Columbia, South Carolina, USA. Columbia Hebrew Benevolent Society. 2011.
- "Marks, Frances Of Richland District, Will Typescript". Record and Image Search. South Carolina Department of Archives and History. 1850. "Search fullname=Marks, Frances"
- "Mere—Mention". Yorkville Enquirer. Yorkville, S.C. 25 February 1869. p. 2.
- "Mrs. E.P. Chamberlin, daughter of Dr. Marks, Barhamville Professor, Dies in Washington". The State. Columbia SC. 31 December 1918. p. 12.
- "S.C. Historical Markers: A Guidebook". South Carolina State Library Digital Collection. 30 January 2020. p. 433. "40-33 South Carolina Female Collegiate Institute"
- "Sharecropping Contract". Family Search Archives. Freedmen's Bureau. 8 May 1866.
- "To The Public". Edgefield Advertiser. Edgefield S.C. 1 Jan 1852. p. 2.
- "Twenty Dollars Reward". Charleston Mercury. Charleston S.C. 17 March 1832. p. 3.
- "VPS obituary database". Augustus C. Long health sciences library. Columbia University library. 2021.
- "1700 Block of Main Street". Historic Columbia. 2022.
- "2600 Barhamville Road". Historic Columbia. 2022.
