= Ann Cunningham =

Ann Cunningham may refer to:

- Lady Ann Cunningham (died 1646), led a mixed-sex cavalry troop during the Battle of Berwick in 1639
- Ann Pamela Cunningham (1816–1875), credited with saving George Washington's home Mount Vernon from ruin and neglect
- Anne Cunningham (born 1937), English actress
