= Appletons' travel guides =

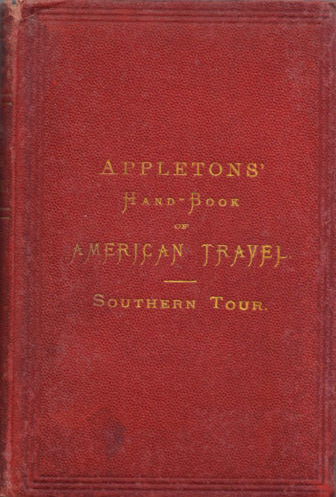
Appletons' Hand-Book of American Travel: Southern Tour, 1873

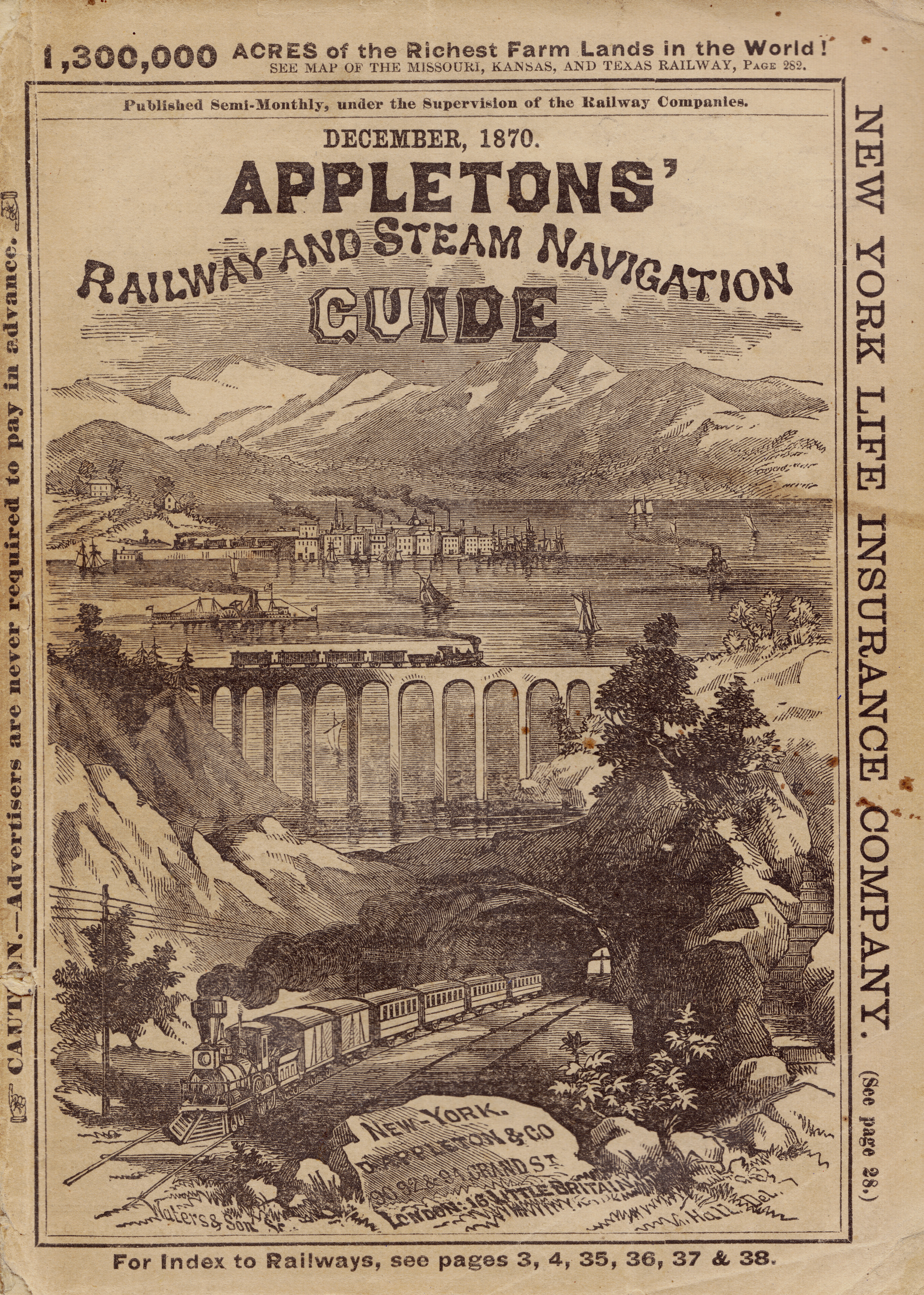
Appletons' Railway & Steam Navigation Guide, December 1870

Appletons' travel guide books were published by D. Appleton & Company of New York. The firm's series of guides to railway travel in the United States began in the 1840s. Soon after it issued additional series of handbooks for tourists in the United States, Europe, Canada and Latin America.

== List of Appletons' guides by geographic coverage ==
=== Canada ===
- Appletons' General Guide to the United States and Canada. New York: D. Appleton & Co. 1879–1901.
- Charles G.D. Roberts (1891), Canadian Guide-book, D. Appleton & Co., OCLC 8079722, OL 23517325M
- Eliza Ruhamah Scidmore (1893). Appletons' Guide-Book to Alaska and the Northwest Coast: including the Shores of Washington, British Columbia, South Eastern Alaska, the Aleutian and the Seal Islands, the Bering and the Arctic Coasts. D. Appleton and Co.

=== Europe ===
- Henry Morford (1868), Appletons' Short-Trip Guide to Europe, New York: Appleton & Co., OL 24232838M
- Appletons' European Guide Book Illustrated, New York: D. Appleton and Co., 1870 (Note: Similar tourist guides to Europe issued in this period of the 19th century included Satchel Guides.)
  - Appletons' European Guide Book Illustrated, London: Longmans, Green, Reader, and Dyer, 1871, OL 7240059M
- Appletons' European Guide Book, Part 1: Including England, Scotland, Ireland, France, Belgium, Holland, and Switzerland, New York: D. Appleton & Co., 1878
  - 1886 ed.: p.1-421 + Index
- Appletons' European Guide Book, Part 2: Including Germany, Italy, Spain, Portugal, Russia, Denmark, Norway, Sweden, Greece, Egypt, Algeria, and the Holy Land, New York: D. Appleton & Co., 1878. p.399-815
  - 1881 ed.: p.425-950
  - 1888 ed.: p.423-916; index

=== Latin America ===
- Alfred Ronald Conkling (1884), Appletons' Guide to Mexico, New York: D. Appleton & Co., OCLC 1667097, OL 6913463M
  - 1893 ed. + Index
- E.C. Buley (1914). North Brazil. South American Handbooks. New York: D. Appleton & Co.
- V. Levine (1914). Colombia. South American Handbooks. New York: D. Appleton & Co.
- E.C. Vivian (1914). Peru. South American Handbooks. New York: D. Appleton & Co.
- E.C. Buley (1920). South Brazil. South American Handbooks. New York: D. Appleton & Co. + Index

=== United States ===
- W. Williams (1848), Appletons' Railroad and Steamboat Companion: being a Travellers' Guide through the United States of America, Canada, New Brunswick and Nova Scotia, New York: D. Appleton & Co., ISBN 0665423276, OL 24771221M
- Appletons' National Railway and Steam Navigation Guide for the United States and Canada. (D. Appleton & Co.) 1856-.
- Thomas Addison Richards (1860), Appletons' Illustrated Hand-book of American Travel, New York: D. Appleton & Co..
  - 1865 ed.
- Appletons' Illustrated Hand-book of American Cities, New York: D. Appleton and Company, 1876, OL 23337561M. Index
- Appletons' Illustrated Hand-book of American Winter Resorts, New York: D. Appleton and Co., 1877
  - 1893 ed. + Index
- Appletons' General Guide to the United States and Canada. New York: D. Appleton & Co. 1879–1901.
  - Appletons' General Guide to the United States and Canada. New York: D. Appleton & Co. 1893. OL 24928392M. Index
- Appletons' Illustrated Hand-book of American Summer Resorts (18th ed.), New York: D. Appleton and Co., 1893
  - 1894 ed. + Index

==== North & East USA ====
- W. Williams (1849), Appletons' New York City and Vicinity Guide, New York: D. Appleton & Company, OL 13994277M
- W. Williams (1851), Appletons' Northern and Eastern Traveller's Guide, New York: D. Appleton, OL 23278479M
  - 1853 ed.; 1872 ed.
  - Appletons' Handbook of American Travel: Northern and Eastern Tour, New York: D. Appleton, 1870
- Edward H. Hall (1867), Appletons' Hand-book of American Travel: Northern Tour (9th ed.), New York: D. Appleton & Co, OCLC 2635615, OL 18109081M
- Appletons' Dictionary of New York and its Vicinity (14th ed.), New York: D. Appleton and Company, 1892
  - 1903 ed.
  - 1904 ed.
- Eliza Ruhamah Scidmore (1893). Appletons' Guide-Book to Alaska and the Northwest Coast. D. Appleton and Co.

==== South & West USA ====
- Edward H. Hall (1866), Appletons' Hand-book of American Travel: the Southern Tour, New York: D. Appleton & Co
  - Charles H. Jones (1873), Appletons' Hand-book of American Travel: the Southern Tour, New York: D. Appleton & Co + Index
- Appletons' Hand-book of American Travel: Western Tour, New York: D. Appleton and Company, 1873, OL 24157746M. Index
- Florida for Tourists, Invalids and Settlers. New York: D. Appleton and Co. 1882. OL 7111225M.
- Walter Lindley; J.P. Widney (1888), California of the South ... Guide-Book to Southern California, D. Appleton and Company, OCLC 479825, OL 20516520M
- James Wood Davidson (1889), The Florida of To-day: a Guide for Tourists and Settlers, New York: D. Appleton and Company, OL 24338630M
- Western and Southern States. Appletons' General Guide to the United States and Canada. New York: D. Appleton & Co. 1889. + Index

== See also ==
- Picturesque America
