= Dovilliers-Manning-Magoffin House =

Historic house in South Carolina, United States

- U.S. National Register of Historic Places
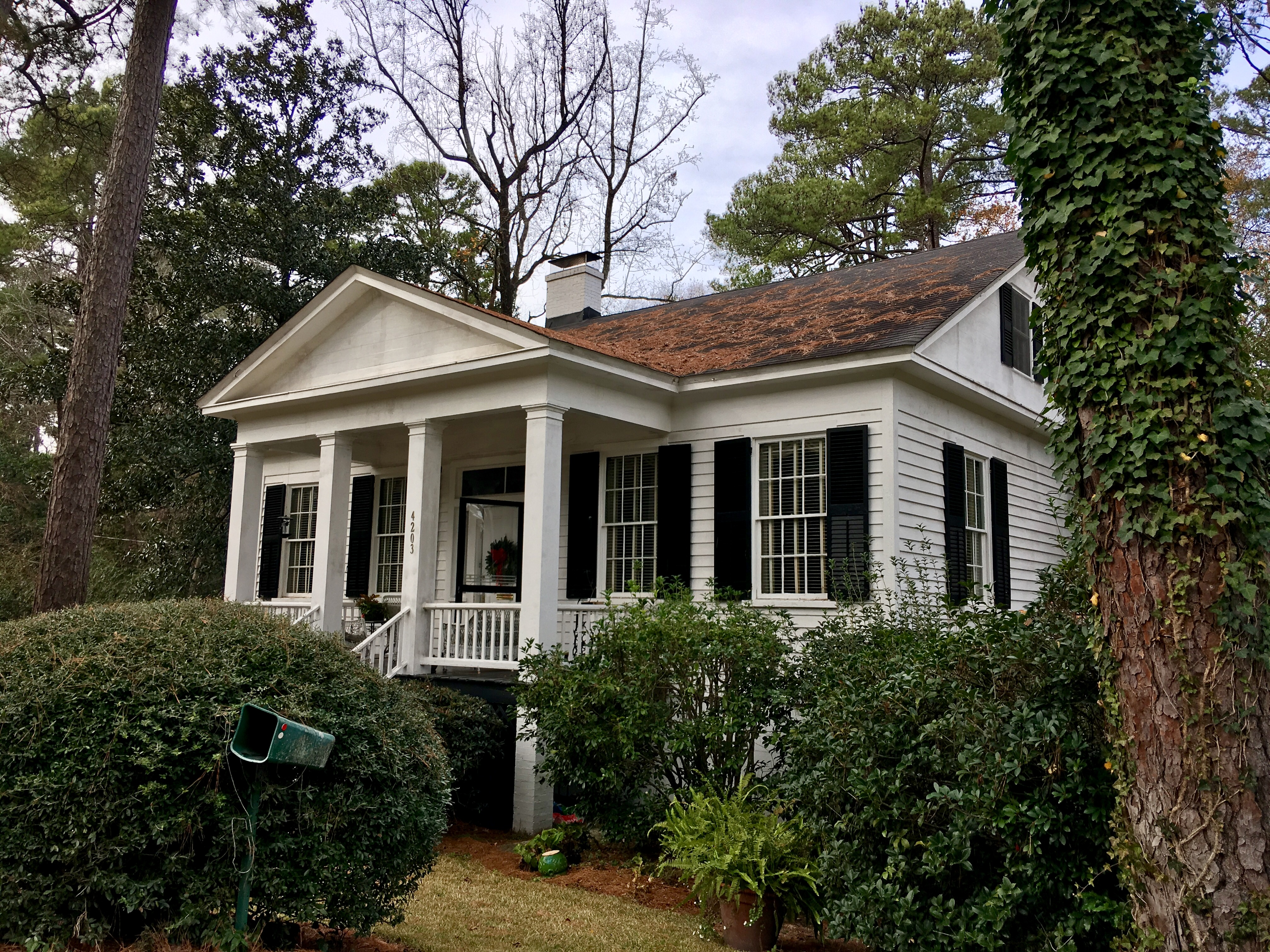

- Location within South Carolina Location within the United States
- Location: 4203 St. Clair Dr., Columbia, South Carolina
- Coordinates: 34°0′34″N 80°58′39″W
- Area: 0.8 acres (0.32 ha)
- Built: 1856
- Architectural style: Greek Revival, Columbia Cottage
- MPS: Columbia MRA
- NRHP reference No.: 79003358
- Added to NRHP: March 2, 1979

Dovilliers-Manning-Magoffin House, also known as the McKay House, is a historic home located at Columbia, South Carolina. It was built in 1856, and is a 1 1/2-story clapboard Greek Revival style cottage. It sits on a raised basement. The front facade features a one-story portico supported by four piers. It was the home of Eugene Dovilliers, an artist; the Manning family; and Dr. Ralph Deman Magoffin, a noted classical archaeologist. The house was moved to its present site in 1964.

It was added to the National Register of Historic Places in 1979.
