= Eugene Dovilliers =

19th Century Artist in Carolinas (1818–1887)

- Born: June 3, 1818; Paris, France
- Died: May 20, 1887 (aged 68); Annapolis, Maryland, US
- Occupations: Artist and teacher
- Known for: Perspectives of South Carolina buildings.; Landscapes of Carolina low-country.
- Spouse: Ellen Brenan

Eugene Alexander Dovilliers (June 3, 1818 – May 20, 1887) was an artist in Columbia, South Carolina from the 1840s to the 1860s. He worked in oil painting and drawing. The drawings were sometimes reproduced by lithography.

== Life ==
Eugene Dovilliers was born in Paris, France, on June 3, 1818. The original family name was De Villiers. He arrived in South Carolina during the early 1840s with his father Michel and mother Zoe. Dovilliers' older brother, Leopold, also immigrated to the U.S. (Note: Dovilliers' brother Leopold Dovillier (1812-1892) was a physician who bravely tended the Union wounded at Bull Run. Leopold was a long-time language professor at the Naval Academy.)

From 1847 to 1849, Dovilliers taught painting, drawing and French at Limestone Springs Female High School in Gaffney, South Carolina. In the 1850 census, he gave his occupation as "Artist". He taught drawing and painting at the Barhamville Institute until 1853, and after that at the Columbia Female Academy in central Columbia. The founder of the Barhamville Institute, Elias Marks, wrote about Dovilliers that his "eminent skill and success ... leave nothing to wish for in this Department, whether it be in copying, or in original sketching from natural scenes."

Dovilliers married Ellen Brenan, who was a skilled music teacher and performer. (Note: Dovilliers wife, Ellen Brenan, performed as a vocalist in New York and was the daughter of a wealthy Columbia merchant. At 18 years old, she owned three slaves.) Between 1853 and 1859, he built a house in Greek Revival style that still stands today in Columbia, although not in the original location. The Dovilliers-Manning-Magoffin House is listed in the National Register of Historic Places. A former student boarder at the house described the house as a "... residence conveniently situated, tastefully furnished and elegantly adorned. Monsieur is a painter of rare talents, as the walls of his rooms and chambers, richly hung with specimens amply testify ..."

Dovilliers was living in Columbia when the Union army occupied it for four difficult days in 1865. At one point, the house was threatened by the fires that destroyed much of Columbia. Another resident reports that he "went to Mr. Dovilliers' and helped his wife put two or three big pictures in frames on her head, which she carried over to my house, and thence beyond the Female College ..."

In 1866, Dovilliers was appointed assistant professor of French language at the U.S. Naval Academy in Annapolis. French was the language of diplomacy and international relations at that time and thus important to naval officers who visited foreign ports.

Dovilliers died on May 20, 1887, while still serving at the Naval Academy. He was buried in the United States Naval Academy Cemetery.

== Art ==
Dovilliers' work displays a variety of styles and media.

- Front perspectives of leading Columbia institutions – Dovilliers' lithograph of the South Carolina College's historic U-shaped campus, "The Horseshoe", is widely reproduced. (South Carolina College is now the University of South Carolina.) A matching lithograph shows the leading college-level school for women in Columbia at that time, the Barhamville Institute. A lithograph shows the exterior of the South Carolina Lunatic Asylum surrounded by a 12-foot wall.
- Large Landscape Paintings – Dovilliers' View of Columbia is a topographical landscape, showing particular buildings like the Asylum, State House and Trinity Church along the horizon. (Note: Topographical landscapes are often associated with the 17th century Dutch and Flemish landscapes, such as View of Haarlem with Bleaching Fields.) Duck Hunting Next to a Grist Mill features a mill that may have been located on the west bank of the Congaree River near Columbia. (Note: Duck Hunting Next to a Grist Mill is a picturesque landscape, in the style of the 16th century French painter Claude Lorrain.) Both of these paintings are about 84 × 105 cm.
- Smaller Landscapes – Dovilliers' Locks on the Broad River is a 20.3 × 25.4 cm charcoal drawing on paper of a riparian landscape.
- Figures – An untitled charcoal drawing portrays a woman walking across stepping stones. Another untitled charcoal work shows a Native American and a woman double riding on a horse. (Note: These figure drawings may show the influence of the Swiss-French artist Karl Bodmer, who visited America in the 1830s.)
- Nature – There is an untitled oil painting on canvas by Dovilliers that shows deer in the woods. A Dovilliers still life of a pear from the Pomaria Plantation is an oil painting on canvas.

== Gallery ==
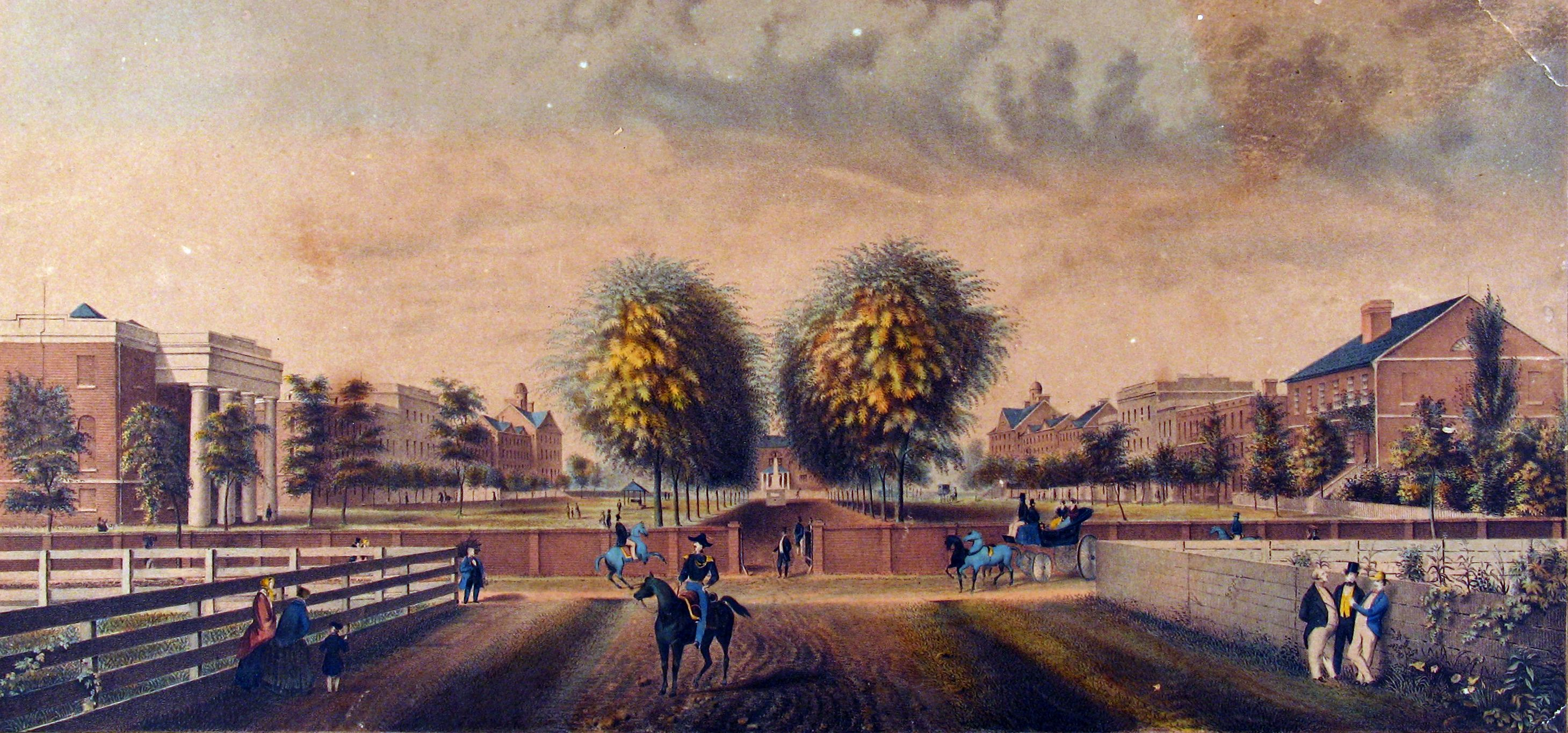
Eugene Dovilliers, South Carolina College, c. 1850, lithograph, South Caroliniana Library

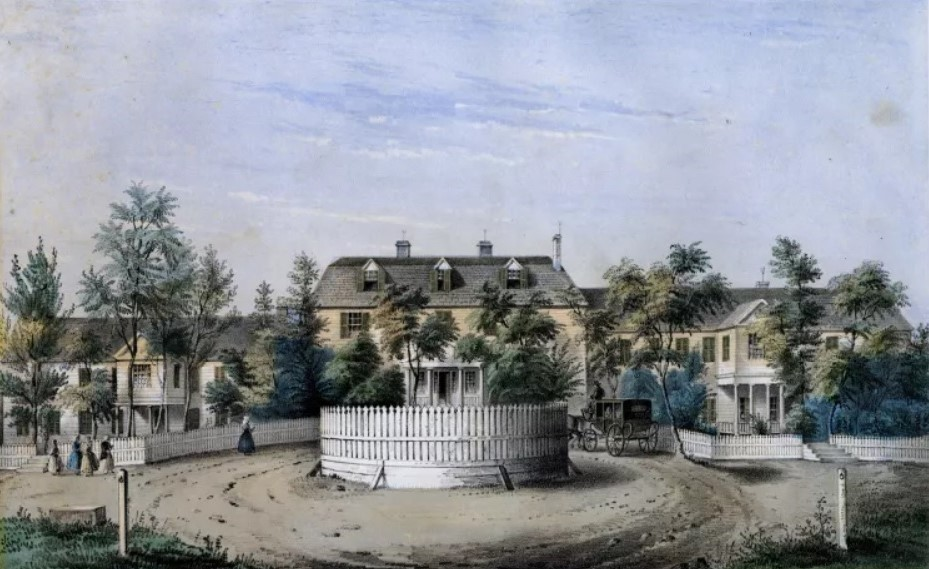
Eugene Dovilliers, South Carolina Female Collegiate Institute, Barhamville S.C., lithograph, Historic Columbia Collection

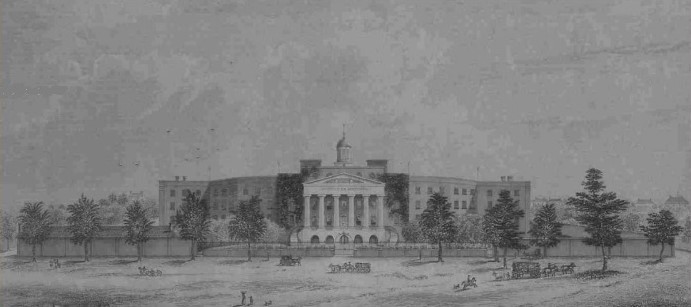
Eugene Dovilliers, South Carolina Lunatic Asylum, lithograph, South Carolina State Museum

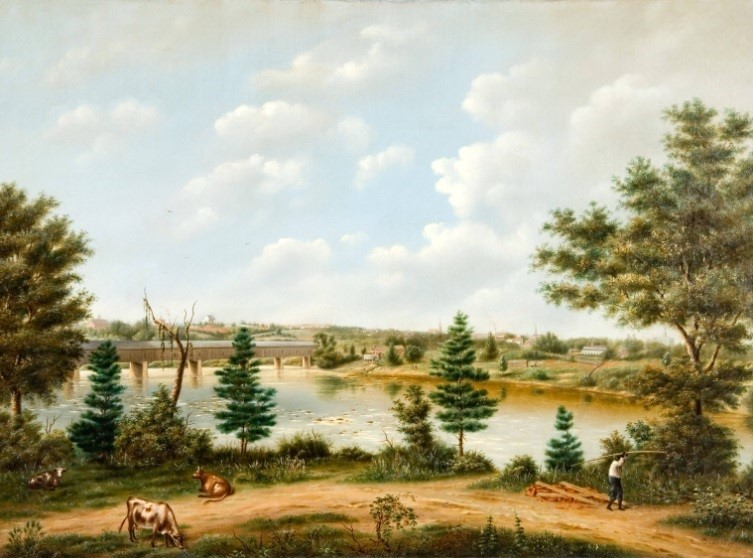
Eugene Dovilliers, View of Columbia, c. 1855, oil on canvas, South Carolina State Museum

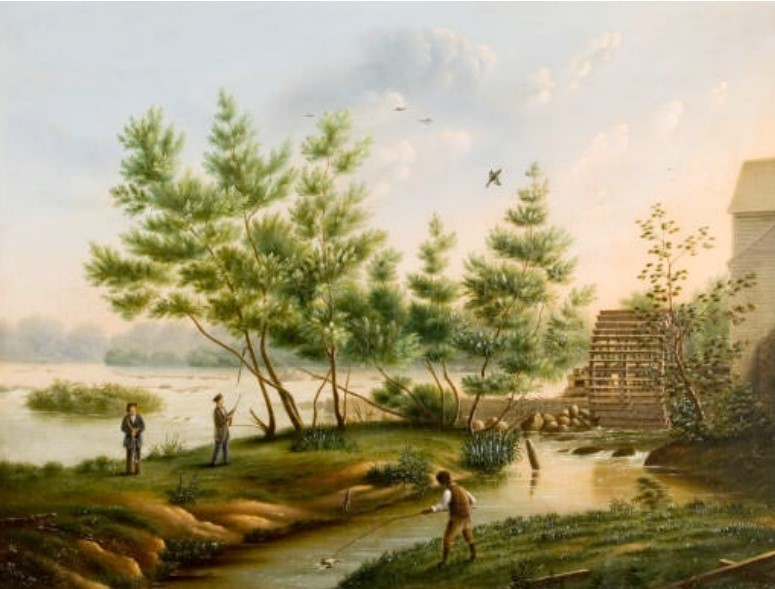
Eugene Dovilliers, Duck Hunting Next to a Grist Mill, c. 1855, oil on canvas, South Carolina State Museum)

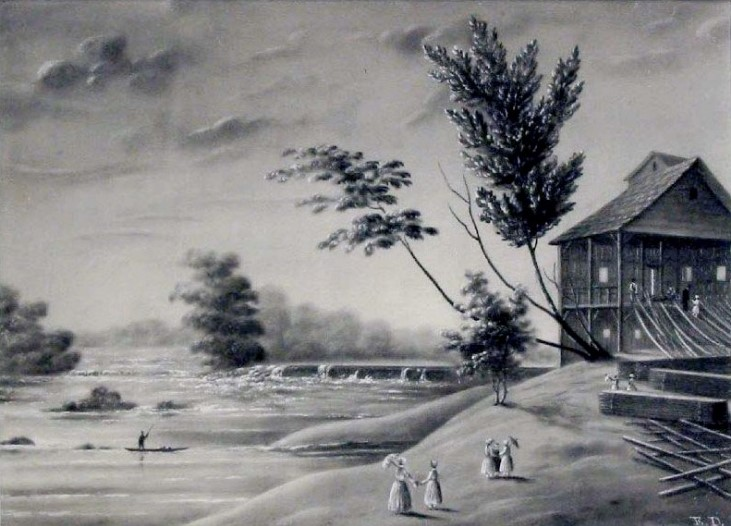
Eugene Dovilliers, Locks on the Broad River, charcoal on paper, Columbia Museum of Art

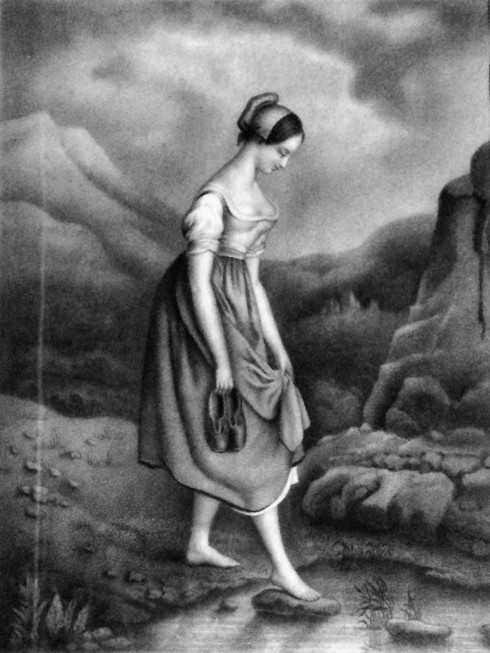
Eugene Dovilliers, untitled (Woman on Stepping Stones), charcoal on paper, South Carolina State Museum

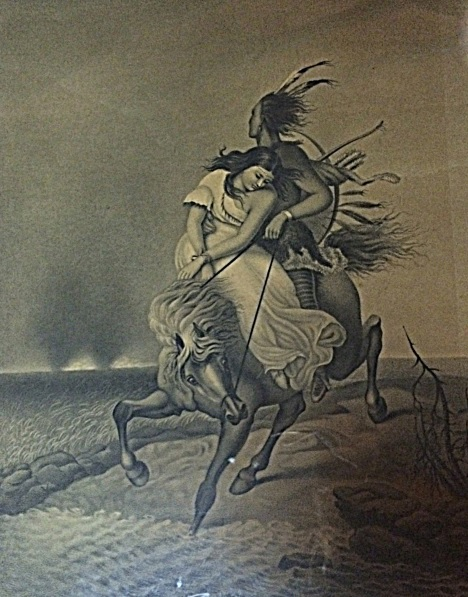
Eugene Dovilliers, untitled (Horse with Riders), charcoal on paper, South Carolina State Museum

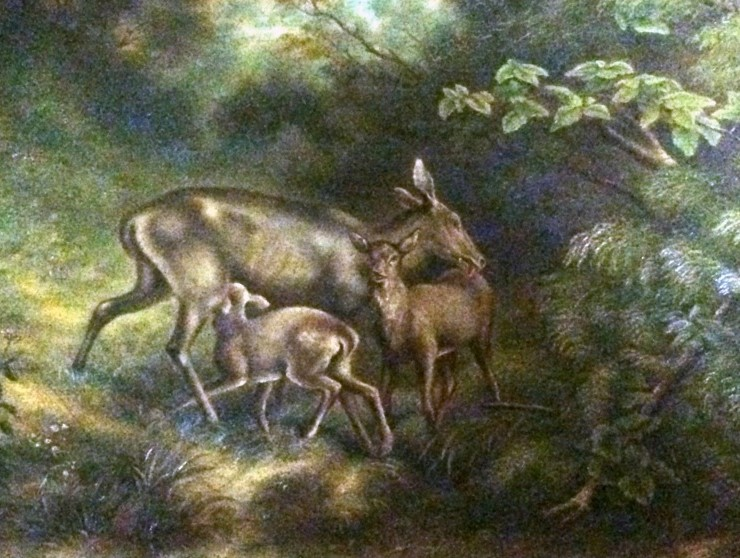
Eugene Dovilliers, untitled (Deer), 1869, oil on canvas, South Carolina State Museum

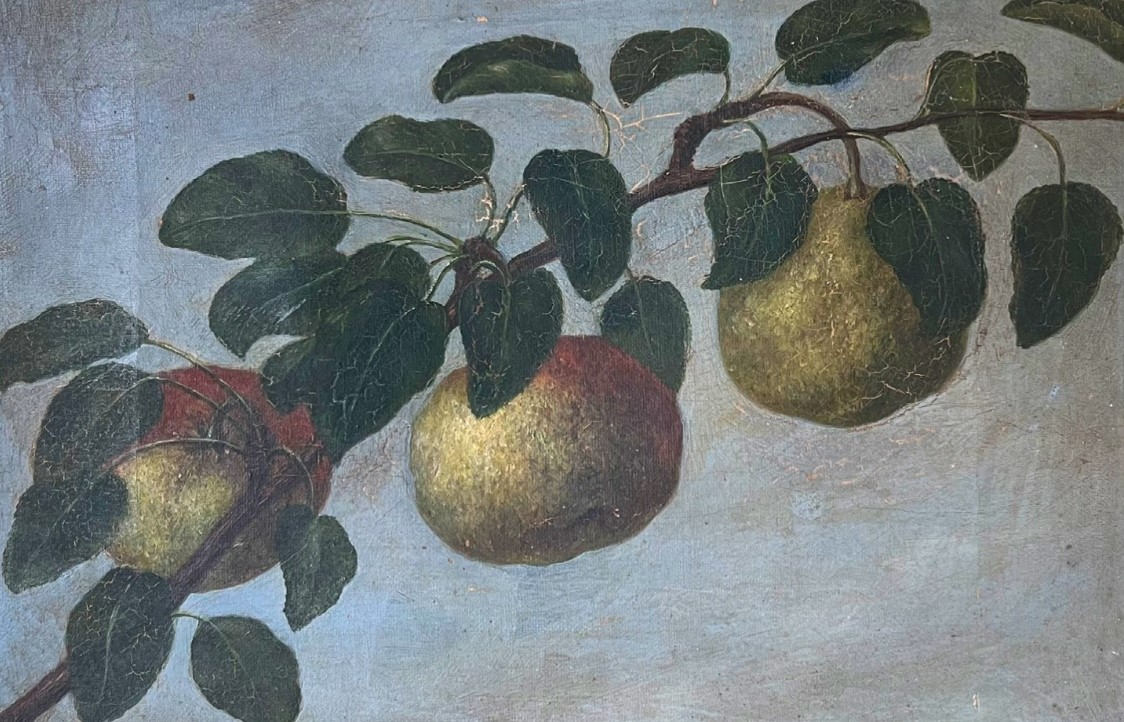
Eugene Dovilliers, untitled (Pears), oil on canvas, private collection
