= Eliza Ruhamah Scidmore =

American writer and photographer (1856–1928)

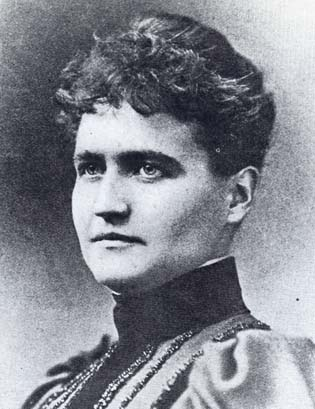
- Born: October 14, 1856; Clinton, Iowa, U.S.
- Died: November 3, 1928 (aged 72); Geneva, Switzerland
- Resting place: Yokohama, Japan
- Occupation: Author
- Known for: Travel writing on Alaska and Asian topics, early proponent of planting Japanese cherry trees in Washington, D.C.

Eliza Ruhamah Scidmore (/ˈsɪdmɔːr/) (1856–1928) was an American journalist and travel writer who wrote books on Alaska, Japan, Java, China and India. She was the first woman on the board of the National Geographic Society. She introduced the idea of planting Japanese cherry trees in Washington, D.C., a vision that became a reality in 1912.

== Life ==
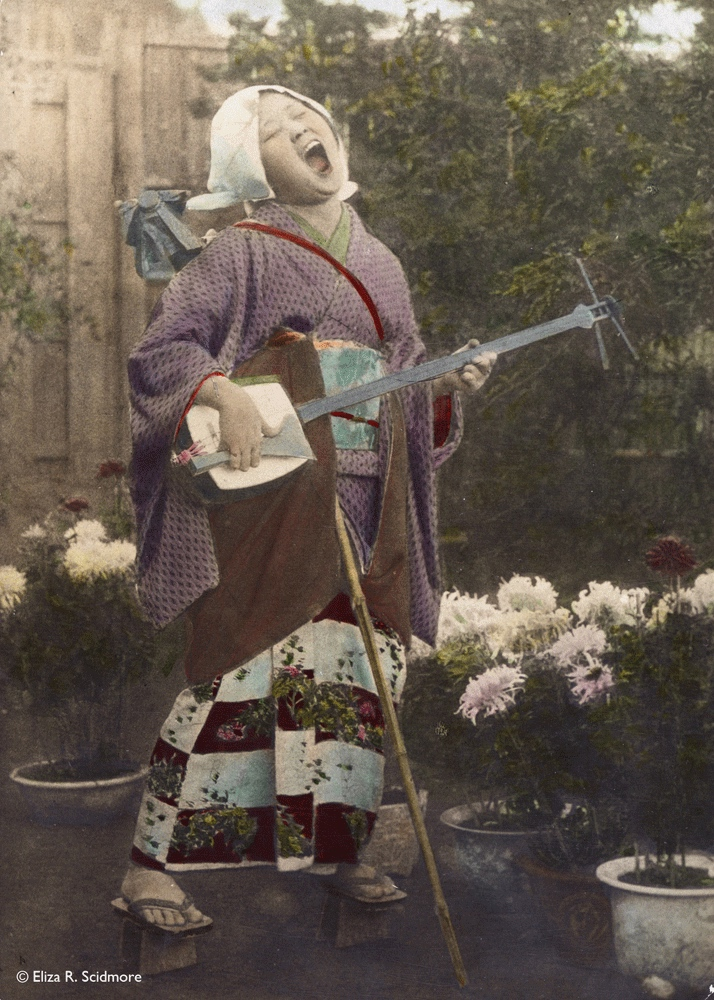
A goze in 1912, photographed by Scidmore and hand-colored

Scidmore was born October 14, 1856, in Clinton, Iowa. She was the daughter of George B. Scidmore and Eliza Catherine Sweeney Scidmore, who settled among family in Madison, Wisconsin, after an itinerant period early in their marriage, when their two children were born. The future writer Eliza spent several years of her early childhood in Madison, before moving to Washington, D.C., with her mother and brother during the Civil War. She later attended Oberlin College, though she never completed a degree. She broke into newspaper work in the 1870s and started her career as a "society writer" in Washington.

A keen interest in geography led her to became a writer of travel "letters" for newspapers. Accounts of her voyages to the territory of Alaska in the summers of 1883 and 1884 resulted in her first book, Alaska, Its Southern Coast and the Sitkan Archipelago (1885). She later wrote a second, more comprehensive book on Alaska, issued in 1893 by the guidebook company Appleton's.

The professional position of her brother, George Hawthorne Scidmore, a career diplomat who served in the Far East from 1884 to 1922, prompted Eliza's frequent travels to Japan, beginning in 1885. His diplomatic position gave her advantages in reporting on areas and subjects not generally accessible to ordinary travelers. Jinrikisha Days in Japan, published in 1891, became one of her best-known books and made her a recognized U.S. expert on Japan. It was followed by a short guidebook, Westward to the Far East (1892), written for the Canadian Pacific Railway.

Influenced by her experiences in Japan, Eliza entertained visions of creating a cherry blossom park in Washington, D.C. She first approached the city's park overseers about the idea in the 1880s, but they showed no interest. More than two decades passed before Eliza found an ally in First Lady Helen Taft, who took up the project with enthusiasm in 1909.

With the first lady's active support, plans moved quickly. But the first effort was aborted when an initial shipment of several thousand trees sent as a gift from Tokyo were found to be infested and had to be destroyed. A second attempt proved successful, leading to the planting of the first cherry trees in West Potomac Park in 1912. Today, more than a million visitors a year flock to Washington to enjoy the sakura surrounding the Tidal Basin, the Jefferson Memorial, and in other areas of the capital, particularly during the National Cherry Blossom Festival.

Scidmore's affiliations in Washington included membership in the National Geographic Society. In 1892 she was elected secretary of the organization, making her the first woman to serve on its governing board. Eliza contributed about a dozen articles to the magazine as well as many photographs taken by herself and others. Today the National Geographic Society gives an Eliza Scidmore Award annually to a photographer "whose work combines scientific rigor and immersive storytelling to advance our understanding of the environmental and conservation issues we face".

As a colleague of leading scientists and naturalists in Washington, Scidmore took an active role in the burgeoning U.S. conservation movement. An article she published in The Century Magazine in September 1893, titled "Our New National Forest Reserves," described the country's new wilderness preservation policy and its importance for the public good.

Scidmore's continued travels across the Far East resulted in several more books, including Java, the Garden of the East (1897); China, the Long-Lived Empire (1900); and Winter India (1903). In a review of Winter India, a writer for Town & Country praised Scidmore for avoiding areas primarily settled by British colonial authorities, and spending substantial time and effort writing about parts of India that were not in popular Western imagination at the time. These included historical cities such as Madurai, Tanjore (now Thanjavur), and Madras (now Chennai).

Another stay in Japan during the Russo-Japanese War became the basis for Scidmore's only known work of fiction, As the Hague Ordains (1907). The novel purports to be the account of the wife of a Russian prisoner, who joins her husband at a prison hospital in Matsuyama. After As the Hague Ordains, Scidmore published no new books and a dwindling number of articles for National Geographic, the last being a 1914 article titled "Young Japan".

Tributes to Eliza R. Scidmore during her lifetime included a medal of honor from the Emperor of Japan for her service to the Japanese people.

She died in Geneva, Switzerland, on November 3, 1928, at the age of 72. Her ashes were interred in the Yokohama Foreign Cemetery, Yokohama, Japan, at the gravesite of her mother and her brother George Hawthorne Scidmore, US consul to Japan.

== See also ==
- Appletons' travel guides
- Sakura (cherry blossoms)

== Bibliography ==
- Parsell, Diana P. (2023). Eliza Scidmore: The Trailblazing Journalist Behind Washington's Cherry Trees. Oxford University Press. ISBN 9780198869429.
