= Joseph Henry Lumpkin House =

Historic house in Georgia, United States

- U.S. National Register of Historic Places
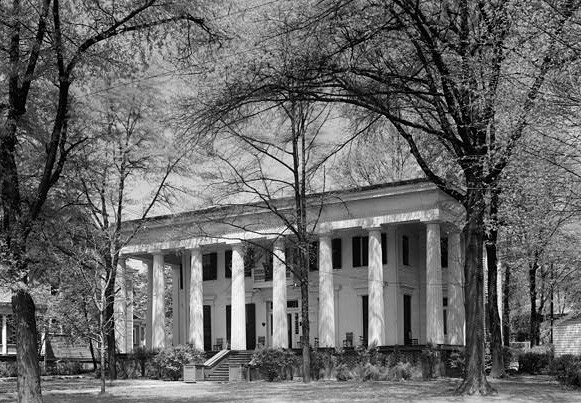
- Joseph Henry Lumpkin House

- Location within Georgia Location within the United States
- Location: 248 Prince Ave., Athens, Georgia
- Coordinates: 33°57′38″N 83°22′57″W
- Area: less than one acre
- Built: 1830s
- Architectural style: Greek revival
- NRHP reference No.: 75000581
- Added to NRHP: June 27, 1975

The Joseph Henry Lumpkin House was built in the 1830s, and purchased by its namesake, the first chief justice of the Georgia Supreme Court, in 1842.

== Early history ==
Built in the 1830s by Charles H. McKinley, the house was originally a much smaller structure. Lumpkin purchased the home around 1842, and in 1850 undertook extensive renovations, when the house was nearly doubled in size. The renovations included a new front, constructed in the historic Greek Revival style, which was altered to face south from the original west facing orientation. At that time, the house sat nearly 400 feet back from Prince Avenue. Lumpkin resided in the home until his death in 1867. After Lumpkin, the house was the site of Madame Sosnowski’s Female Institute, offering young women instruction in German, French, and music. The institute was closed in 1899, with the death of Madame Sosnowski.

In 1906, as the city of Athens expanded and land within the city limits became more dear, the house was placed on rollers and moved "several hundred feet" closer to Prince Avenue. Beginning in the early 1900s and for several decades thereafter, the house served as the home of the Athens Women's Club. The Club donated the house to the Joseph Henry Lumpkin Foundation in 1975. The structure subsequently underwent substantial renovations to both the exterior and interior.

== University of Georgia School of Law ==
The University of Georgia School of Law had the building renovated for its Institute of Continuing Legal Education; it reopened in 1984.

== Location and historic recognition ==
The house is located at 248 Prince Avenue in Athens, Georgia.

It was added to the Georgia State Historical Marker Program in 1964 (#029-12).
