= Octavia Walton Le Vert =

American socialite and writer (1811–1877)

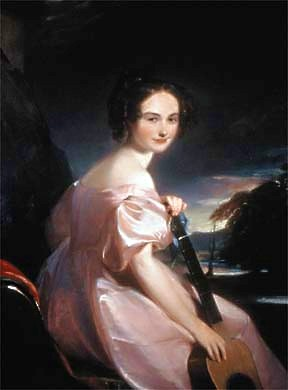
- Octavia Walton Le Vert, painted in 1833 by Thomas Sully.
- Born: Octavia Celestia Valentine Walton; August 11, 1811; Belle Vue, Augusta, Georgia
- Died: March 12, 1877 (aged 65); Augusta, Georgia
- Resting place: Walker Family Cemetery, Augusta, Georgia
- Spouse: Dr. Henry Strachey Le Vert (m. 1836–1864)
- Children: Octavia Walton Le Vert; Claudia Anna Eugenia Le Vert; Sally Walker Walton Le Vert; Henrietta Caroline Le Vert
- Parent(s): George Walton Jr. Sally Minge Walker

Octavia Walton Le Vert (Note: Also sometimes spelled LeVert or Levert) (August 11, 1811 – March 12, 1877), née Octavia Celestia Valentine Walton, was an American socialite and writer. She became one of the first female Southern writers to achieve national recognition. Although largely faded from history today, she was a well-known figure during her own time. From the 1830s through the 1850s she was noted for hosting gatherings of prominent politicians, noted literary figures, and professionals of all types. She was friends with a variety of prominent 19th century figures.

LeVert was born in Augusta, Georgia, and moved with her parents to Mobile, Alabama, in 1835, where she married Dr. Henry Strachey Le Vert in 1836. During her travels to Europe she was presented at the courts of several countries. She also received an audience with the Pope during her time there. Following her last European tour and return to the United States, she took on a role in the successful national campaign to purchase and restore Mount Vernon, the home of George Washington. Following the American Civil War, with her husband dead and much of her fortune gone, she returned to her birthplace of Georgia and embarked on an ultimately unsuccessful lecture tour. She was inducted into the Alabama Women's Hall of Fame in 1990.

== Early life ==
Octavia Walton was born on August 11, 1810, at her maternal grandmother's home, Belle Vue, near Augusta, Georgia. Her parents' first home, Meadow Garden, was nearby. Her parents were George Walton Jr. and Sally Minge Walker. George Walton Jr. was educated at Princeton University, eventually becoming a prominent lawyer and Georgia state representative. Sally Minge Walker was from a socially prominent Georgia family. Octavia Walton was the oldest of two children. Her younger brother, Robert Watkins Walton, was born in 1812.

Her paternal grandparents were George Walton Sr. and Dorothy Camber. George Walton Sr. was a signer of the Declaration of Independence, chief justice of the Georgia Supreme Court, second governor of Georgia, and later a United States senator. Her maternal grandparents were George Walker and Elizabeth Talbot. The Walker family plantation, Belle Vue, is now a part of Augusta University. George Walker served in the Georgia General Assembly during the late 18th century and later in the Georgia House of Representatives before dying at age thirty-eight in 1804.

Octavia was taught at home by her mother and paternal grandmother in a variety of subjects, and she and Robert were also tutored in science and Latin by a Scottish teacher. She showed a unique comprehension of languages at an early age. She was fluent in French and Spanish and could speak Italian before she was a teenager.

When wit, and wine, and friends have met
And laughter crowns the festive hour
In vain I struggle to forget
Still does my heart confess thy power
And fondly turn to thee!

But Octavia, do not strive to rob
My heart, of all that soothes its pain
The mournful hope that every throb
Will make it break for thee!

— attributed to Edgar Allan Poe

George Walton Jr. was appointed Florida's first territorial secretary in 1821, taking his family with him to Pensacola. Octavia assisted her father by translating French and Spanish documents into English. During her father's long tenure in Florida, her mother frequently took the children on tours along the Eastern Seaboard. Historians and literary scholars believe that it was during one of these trips in the late 1820s that she encountered Edgar Allan Poe, with whom she continued correspondence until his death. After her death, a poem, the text of which was authenticated as being written in Poe's hand, was found in one of her personal albums. The date "May 1, 1827" was written in her hand on the poem.

During another East Coast trip during the early 1830s, Walton met Washington Irving while traveling on a stagecoach. The two became friends and remained so until Irving's death. Irving encouraged Le Vert to express herself through writing. She spent several seasons in Washington, D.C.. During this time she attended congressional debates and met Daniel Webster, John C. Calhoun, and Henry Clay, becoming friends with all three, but developing an especially close friendship with Clay.

== Marriage ==
Following the completion of his term in 1834, George Walton Jr. moved his family to Mobile, Alabama in 1835. Here, Octavia Walton met Dr. Henry Strachey Le Vert, the son of a French physician who had served as field surgeon to General Jean-Baptiste Donatien de Vimeur, comte de Rochambeau during the American Revolutionary War. They married in 1836. Her father was elected as the 11th Mayor of Mobile the following year.

The Le Verts settled into a large c. 1827 home, expanding it into a mansion in 1847. It was located at the corner of St. Emanuel and Government streets in Mobile. The couple had five children: Octavia Walton Le Vert, born on November 20, 1836; Claudia Anna Eugenia Le Vert, born on May 22, 1838; Sally Walker Walton Le Vert, born on April 6, 1841; a stillborn son in 1844; and Henrietta Caroline Le Vert, born on December 6, 1846. Only Octavia and Henrietta survived into adulthood.

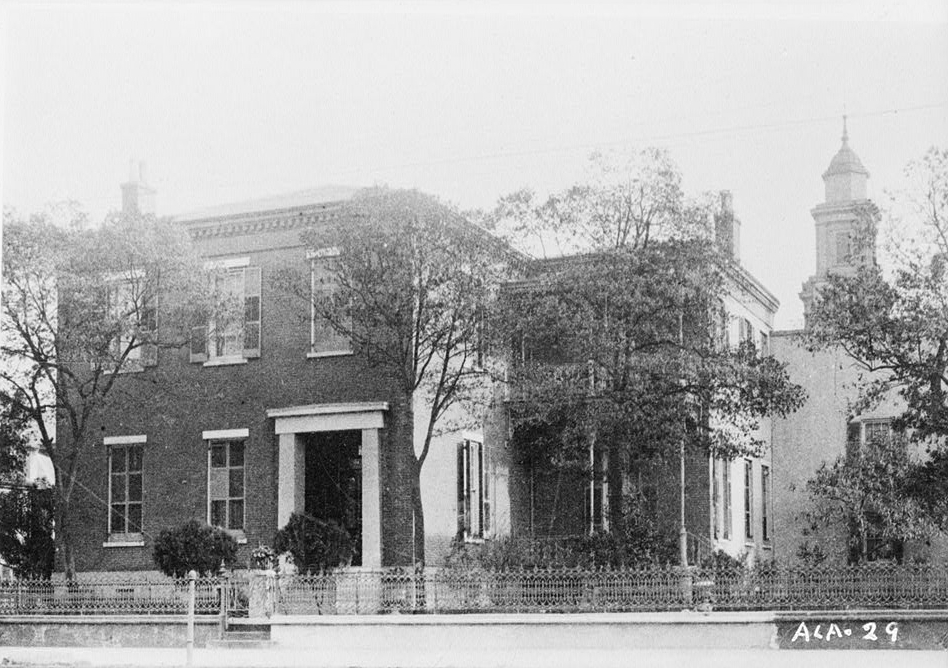
19th-century view of the Le Vert Mansion at the corner of Royal and Government streets in Mobile, demolished during the 1960s.

Octavia Le Vert, by this time more commonly known as Madame Le Vert, began hosting lavish parties at her home for Mobile society and encouraging the development of music and the arts in the city. During this time she entertained numerous prominent people at her home, including Frederika Bremer, James Buchanan, Joseph Jefferson, Lajos Kossuth, and Alexander H. Stephens. Her literary correspondents included Edwin Booth, Edward Everett, Millard Fillmore, and Henry Wadsworth Longfellow. She was Buchanan's special guest at a ball in honor of Albert Edward, Prince of Wales. One of her closest friends, Lady Emmeline Stuart-Wortley-Mackenzie, wrote several pages about her as Madame L. V___ in her book, Travels in the United States, following a visit to Mobile in 1850. She noted that Le Vert had still not recovered from the shock of losing her children and visited their graves with her. Noting two drawing room portraits of the lost Le Vert children in the home, she wrote that they suggested a poem that she included in the Mobile entry.

Encouraged by Lady Stuart-Wortley-Mackenzie, Le Vert embarked on a tour of Europe in 1853 with her husband and oldest daughter. While there, she visited the courts of the United Kingdom, Spain, and Italy. She was presented to Queen Victoria of the United Kingdom by Lady Stuart-Wortley-Mackenzie. In 1855, she was appointed by the governor of Alabama, John A. Winston, to serve as the state's commissioner to the Exposition Universelle in Paris. She was the Exposition's only female commissioner. While on this European trip, she met Napoleon III and Pope Pius IX.

Upon her return to the United States, she wrote an account of her travels and her experiences with European high society, entitled Souvenirs of Travel. It was published in 1857 and went through five printings in her lifetime. Her visit to the former home of the Italian poet Ludovico Ariosto and seeing how well it had been preserved inspired her to join the cause of saving Washington's Mount Vernon estate in Virginia. She joined the Mount Vernon Ladies' Association and was appointed as the fourth vice regent in 1858, serving until her death.

== Later life ==
Le Vert's life took a turn for the worse with the outbreak of the American Civil War. She was not a strong supporter of the secession of Alabama from the United States and had conflicted feelings towards the institution of slavery. Once war broke out, however, she and her daughters served as nurses in the Confederate hospitals. Her husband died in Mobile on March 15, 1864, and was interred in Magnolia Cemetery alongside their children.

It was widely known that she gladly received the news of the end of the war and then entertained occupying Union soldiers in her home following the surrender of Mobile. This caused her to be ostracized by many in the city, who saw her as a traitor. Her fortune was gone after the war and she soon left Mobile for good. She visited New York City and Washington, D.C., but eventually returned to her birth state of Georgia and attempted a lecture tour. She took up residence in Augusta on Monte Sano Avenue near the corner of Bellevue Avenue, a block away from her grandparents' former Belle Vue estate. She also wrote Souvenirs of Distinguished People and Souvenirs of the War, but neither book was ever published. In the end, she was forced to depend on the charity of her cousins. Le Vert died in Augusta on March 12, 1877, and was buried in the Walker Family Cemetery on the grounds of the Augusta Arsenal. A later owner of her Monte Sano Avenue home dubbed the wood-frame house as "Chateau Le Vert". It was demolished during the 1960s.

== Popular culture ==
Josef Gung'l wrote a polka, Levert Polka, and dedicated it to Mrs. Octavia Walton LeVert.
