= Joseph Henry Lumpkin =

American judge (1799–1867)

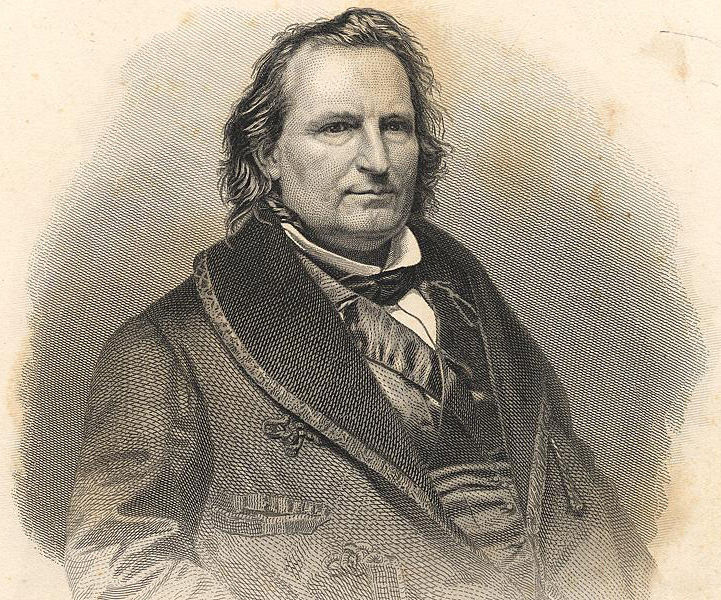
- Born: December 23, 1799; Oglethorpe County, Georgia
- Died: June 4, 1867 (aged 67); Athens, Georgia

Joseph Henry Lumpkin (December 23, 1799 – June 4, 1867) was the first chief justice of the Supreme Court of the U.S. state of Georgia. While ambivalent on the topic of slavery early in his life, he was a slaveholder and eventually became a devout defender of the institution.

== Biography ==
=== Early life and education ===
Lumpkin was born in Oglethorpe County, Georgia. He attended the University of Georgia (UGA) in Athens, Georgia, for some time and then attended and graduated from Princeton College in 1819. After studying law under the tutelage of Thomas W. Cobb, Lumpkin was admitted to the state bar in 1820, and he began practicing in Lexington, Georgia.

=== Career ===
After serving two terms in the Georgia General Assembly, 1824–1825, Lumpkin turned his full attention to his legal career. In 1833, Lumpkin worked in unison with future U.S. Congressman and Georgia Governor, William Schley, and John H. Cuthbert to create the Georgia state penal code.

After the creation of the Supreme Court of Georgia in 1845, Lumpkin was elected as one of three initial justices to preside over that court and was its first chief justice. He served on the court for more than 20 years until his death. Lumpkin was offered the faculty chair of rhetoric and oratory at UGA in 1846, but he declined it. He did the same when offered the chancellorship of UGA in 1860. Even a presidential appointment to a seat on the US Court of Claims was turned down by Lumpkin so that he could remain on the state supreme court.

Lumpkin also had a plantation in Athens, Georgia, where he owned 18 slaves. One of the slaves he owned was William Finch who he purchased from Judge Garnett Andrews, the father of Eliza Frances Andrews in 1848.

=== University of Georgia School of Law ===
He was one of three co-founders of the University of Georgia School of Law in 1859. Originally known as the Lumpkin School of Law; it is now known as the University of Georgia School of Law. Lumpkin taught at the law school until the university shut down during the American Civil War. He also served as a trustee for the school for many years.

=== Other writings ===
His writings and policies suggest a mixing of religion, economics, and politics. For Lumpkin, like many in his era, believed that economic and moral progress went together.:

In the early 1820s Lumpkin underwent an evangelical conversion that profoundly affected his life. He took an active part in the temperance movement on both the national and state levels. He also believed that slavery was sanctioned by the Bible and often cited religious arguments to support continuation of that institution."

However, early in his career he had expressed opposition to slavery. By the time Lumpkin was on the Georgia Supreme Court, he was devoted to promoting slavery. In an 1850 address to the South Carolina Institute, Lumpkin pointed to corporations and to slavery as key to promoting economic development in the South.

=== Death ===
Lumpkin died and was buried in Athens on June 4, 1867.

== See also ==
- Joseph Henry Lumpkin House

Preceded by None	Chief Justices of the Supreme Court of Georgia; 1863–1867	Succeeded by Hiram B. Warner
