= Rosemont Plantation =

Archaeological site in South Carolina, United States

- U.S. National Register of Historic Places
- Nearest city: Waterloo, South Carolina
- Area: 6 acres (2.4 ha)
- Built: 1875
- NRHP reference No.: 93000459
- Added to NRHP: June 11, 1993

Rosemont Plantation is a historic archaeological site located near Waterloo, Laurens County, South Carolina. Development of the Piedmont plantation complex was begun sometime between 1750 and 1790. It reached its zenith as a cotton plantation during the second quarter of the 19th century, when it was occupied by the Cunningham family, whose descendants retained control. The main house of Rosemont burned in 1930. The Cunninghams sold it after that.

The site is largely wooded, but there are architectural remains of seven structures and some formal gardens. At one time there were at least 17 buildings and activity areas, including vegetable and flower gardens, a race track, separate living quarters for the adult Cunningham daughter in the 19th century, and other facilities. An archeological survey was done in 1992 by Historic Landscape and Garden Design, and Chicora Foundation, Inc., both of Columbia, South Carolina, for the Laurens County Historical Society. (See Trinkley, 1992)

Architectural and archeological remains at Rosemont Plantation may provide information on intra-site patterning, subsistence data, refuse disposal patterns, architecture and organization of the plantation, and the display of wealth by the plantation owners.

In the mid-19th century, it was the home of Ann Pamela Cunningham (1816-1875), who became an activist in historic preservation and lived here all her life. She founded the Mount Vernon Ladies' Association, which purchased Mount Vernon in 1859 for restoration and preservation.

Rosemont Plantation was added to the National Register of Historic Places in 1993.
