= Sophie Sosnowski =

Educator in American South (1809–1899)

Sophie Wentz Sosnowski
- Portrait of Sophie Sosnowski
- Born: April 23, 1809; Baden-Württemberg, Germany
- Died: July 17, 1899 (aged 90); Athens, Georgia, US
- Occupation: Educator
- Known for: Founding women's schools in South Carolina and Georgia; Saving Barhamville Institute during Civil War
- Spouse: Josef Stanislaus Sosnowski
- Children: 4

Sophie Wentz Sosnowski (April 23, 1809 – July 17, 1899) was an American educator who founded schools in the 19th century for the education of young women. "The Home School" that she established in Athens, Georgia, became particularly well known in the South. She contributed to the saving of the buildings of the Barhamville Institute from the widespread fires during the Union occupation of Columbia, South Carolina.

== Early life ==
Sophie Wentz Sosnowski was born (as Sophia Marie Wentz) on April 23, 1810 in Karlsruhe within the Grand Duchy of Baden. (Note: Sosnowski's first name sometimes appears in the references as Sophia rather than Sophie. The same is true for her daughter Sophie Augusta. Some sources give her birthplace as Pforzheim, about 20 miles from Karlsruhe.) Sosnowski's father Christian Wentz served as Court Physician to the Grand Duke and her mother Augusta Oehlenheinz was a lady-in-waiting to the Grand Duke's spouse. While growing up in that favored environment, Sosnowski received a good education, especially in foreign languages and music.

In 1833 Sophie married a wounded Polish officer named Josef Stanislaus Sosnowski at Strasbourg Cathedral. He was one of a group of 6,000 officers exiled after the failed Polish Revolt of 1831 against the Russian empire. Josef was the grandson of Józef Sylwester Sosnowski, the Grand Hetman of Sosnowica.

The couple emigrated to Erie, Pennsylvania, where Josef speculated unsuccessfully in real estate and lost the family assets in the Panic of 1837. (Note: The Sosnowski family lost $60,000 when the St. Louis Savings Bank failed.) Josef died in 1845, leaving Sophie with three surviving children: Sophie (a.k.a. Sophia) Augusta, Caroline (a.k.a. Callie or Kallie) and Julius Christian.

== Educator through the Civil War ==
To sustain her family after her husband's death, Sosnowski trained and taught at the Troy Female Seminary, founded by Emma Willard, who was an early female education activist. Sosnowski taught music, (Note: Sosnowski had a mezzo-contralto singing voice with beautiful timbre.) French and German. Music education was particularly important in young women's education at that time.

Finding the upstate New York climate unsuitable to her health, Sosnowski moved to South Carolina around 1845. Sosnowski briefly taught at Mm. Dupree's school in Charleston and at the Barhamville Institute in Columbia. Bishop Stephen Elliott recruited Sosnowski to teach at Montpelier Female Institute in Georgia, where she stayed until she moved back to Columbia in 1850. Willard and Elliott both maintained lifelong friendships with the Sosnowski family.

In 1856–57, Sosnowski again took a position at the Barhamville Institute, a prestigious school that aspired to teach young women at the collegiate level. She taught German, instrumental and vocal music, and painting. In 1860, Sosnowski opened a school of her own in central Columbia. It became "Madame Sosnowski's Female Institute" in 1862. Sosnowski took over as headmistress of the Barhamville Institute in 1864, since the "venerable" owner, Elias Marks, had retired. She brought the students from her school to join those at the Barhamville Institute, which was over two miles from the central grid of Columbia.

During this period Sosnowski's musically talented daughter, Sophie Augusta Sosnowski, romantically inspired the poet Henry Timrod. They may have met through Augustus Baldwin Longstreet, a nearby college president who was friends with Sosnowski.

A German-American military officer named Frank Schaller joined Sosnowski's circle and married Sophie Augusta in 1863. (Note: The poet Timrod had been sidelined by Sophie Augusta because of his heavy drinking.) Schaller had an excellent military education in Europe (Note: European military training was less useful than expected when applied in America. There was a "psychological difference between the harshly disciplined troops who comprised the European armies and the rugged, undisciplined, and highly independent fighters" of the Confederacy.) but was sickly. His service as a Colonel in the 22nd Mississippi Infantry and other Confederate units was not a success. Sosnowski used her acquaintance with the Polish-American Confederate officer Gaspar Tochman to advance her son-in-law's military career.

During the American Civil War (1861-1865), Sosnowski – and sometimes her family and students – tended to the Confederate wounded, who had been brought to Richmond and Columbia.

== Defender of Barhamville Institute ==
The Civil War came to Columbia during 17 to 20 February 1865. Union General William Tecumseh Sherman occupied Columbia for four days during his campaign of the Carolinas as the Union force of 60,000 men marched from Savannah, Georgia, to Virginia. When Sosnowski heard that the Union army was heading toward Columbia, she arranged transportation for the remaining students to go to the Upcountry, a difficult task when the enemy approaches and disorder reigns at the railroad station.

Law and order weakened during the occupation and rough mobs wandered about. The large supplies of alcoholic beverages in Columbia did not help the situation. "Alcohol was liberally distributed to all who desired it by both blacks and whites." Intentional and accidental fires destroyed about a third of the houses in the central grid of Columbia. Many of the structures near the Barhamville Institute were burned. (Note: Sosnowski's colleague, Felix Thaddeus Strawinski (1810-1875), had a bad encounter with drunken soldiers while trying to protect a neighbor's house during the Union occupation. Strawinski was another exiled Polish officer and a teacher of dance and music at Barhamville.) Sosnowski, unarmed, used her interpersonal skills to talk trespassers into leaving the grounds of the Barhamville Institute. She repeatedly found Union soldiers to deter the more determined interlopers, but the soldiers would not remain around for long.

The Union Army assigned soldiers to protect certain buildings such as schools and some guards arrived at the Barhamville Institute on first night. (Note: "General Sherman ordered the Union army to "destroy public buildings, railroad property, manufacturing and machine shops" and to "spare libraries, asylums and private dwellings.") Only one soldier from Tennessee put any effort into protecting the school, after he found that he had a common acquaintance with Sosnowski.

On the second day, Sosnowski met some Union officers who noticed her late-husband's Masonic flag that she had hung on the door. One of the officers, who wore a Masonic pin, seemed unsympathetic but later send guards for the rest of the day.

During the third day, she went into the center of Columbia, seeking additional guards. She briefly spoke with Sherman himself, leader of the 60,000 Union soldiers. Sosnowski told Sherman that the deportment of the soldiers compared unfavorably to that of their European equivalents and complained about the suffering from the war and occupation, especially to civilians. In response to Sosnowski, Sherman "... spoke in strong terms of the responsibility of Columbia, of South Carolina, for the sufferings by Secessions; indeed as he only advocated one side of the question, he spoke well." Sherman concluded the conversation by saying that "... he expected to leave the following morning and therefore required the whole Army to be at their post ..." so no more guards would be forthcoming.

Sosnowski met a unit of friendly Irish American soldiers, who spend the third night at Barhamville and drove off marauders. "Silver and old relics" were looted from the buildings. By Sosnowski's efforts, the Barhamville Institute structures were still standing when the Union Army resumed their march the next day. (Note: In an anticlimax, most of the Barhamville Institute burned down accidentally in 1869.)

== Educator in Athens ==
Sosnowski left ruined Columbia and moved to Athens, Georgia, with her daughters and son-in-law Frank Schaller. Initially she was principal at the financially-failing Lucy Cobb Institute, but in 1869 she had a dispute with the school's board of directors. Sosnowski left to establish a school of her own, calling it "The Home School". (Note: Sosnowski's "The Home School" had nothing to do with homeschooling.) Many of the Lucy Cobb students followed her there. "The Home School became famous all over the South, especially in Georgia and South Carolina." It operated out of the historic Lumpkin House. "Sosnowski or her daughter Caroline conducted this school until around 1900." (Note: The students in later years after the economy recovered must have been from prosperous families since Caroline would conducted student trips to Europe.)

Sosnowski's daughter Sophie Augusta died in 1867 after the birth of her second daughter Sophie Schaller. Sosnowski and Caroline raised Sophie Augusta's two daughters Ida Schaller and Sophie Schaller. (Note: Sophie Schaller married the chemist Charles Herty.)

Sosnowski died on Monday, 17 July 1899. She is buried at Oconee Hill Cemetery.

== Views ==
While "... the stock image of the typical German immigrant, before and during the Civil War, is that of a principled, upright, freedom-loving supporter of the Union", Sosnowski was among those German Americans who became supporters of the South and the Confederacy. After the Civil War, she wrote that "While slavery was in general a blessing [sic] to the Negro, still the institution in the abstract was antagonistic to the spirit of our age; hence it had to fall."

Sosnowski criticized Reconstruction, which was a time of economic and social difficulty in Georgia. She wrote – perhaps referring to the 14th Amendment – that “... to place the Negro on the same level with the Caucasian race, must be considered by every reflecting mind, a great political blunder."

== Posthumous assessments ==
A local historian of Athens recollected that Sosnowski “... was a princess in grace and courtesy of manner. She was highly educated, a brilliant musician and of very distinguished appearance. It was an education to a girl to be associated with the Madame and Miss Callie."

A later assessment states: "Added to unusual natural artistic and musical gifts ... her lofty character, pure ideals, abhorrence of the insincere and the false, made her a person whose impress upon young people was above the price of rubies."
