= Anna Cora Mowatt =

French-born American author, playwright, and actress

Anna Cora Mowatt Ritchie
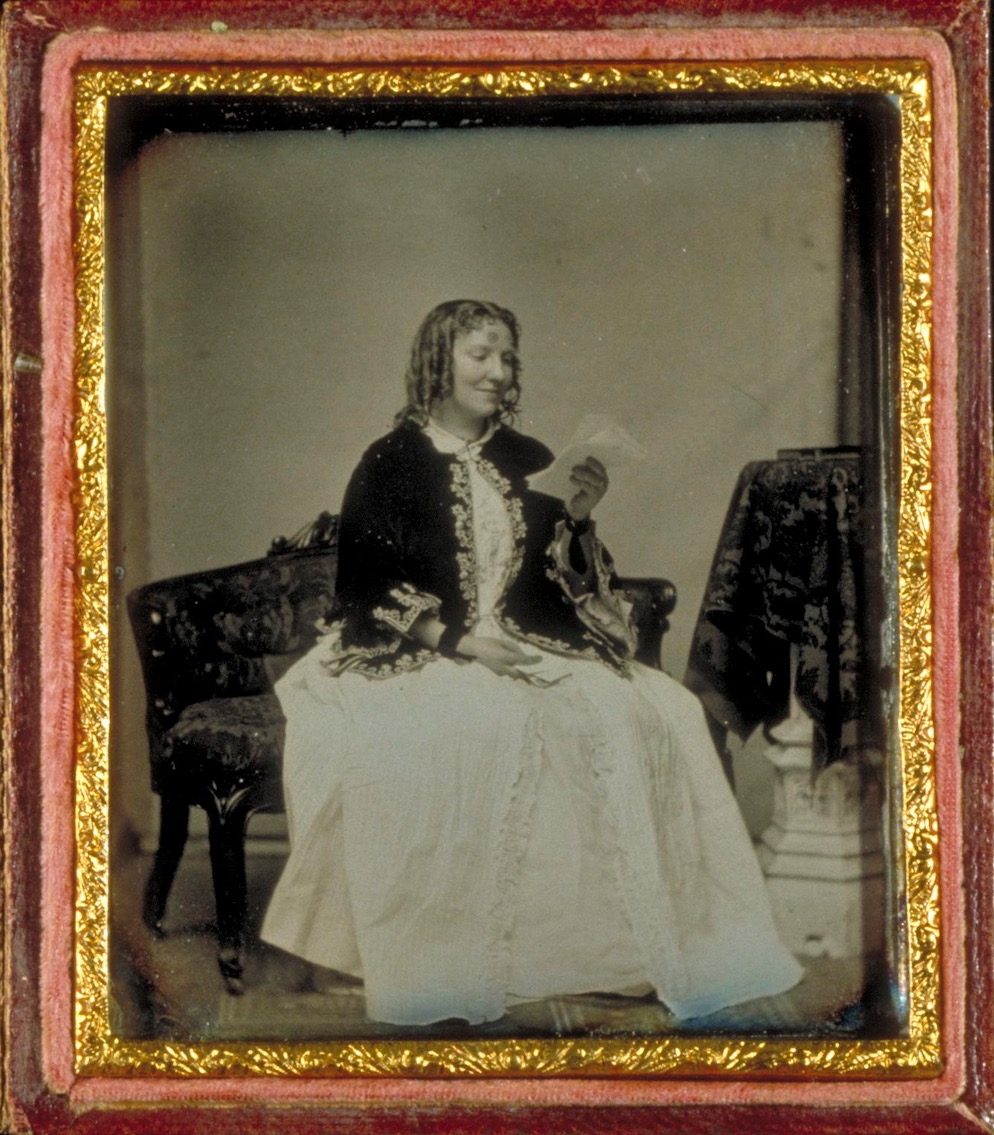
- Portrait of Anna Cora Mowatt Ritchie, c. 1840–1860
- Born: Anna Cora Ogden; March 5, 1819; Bordeaux, France
- Died: July 21, 1870 (aged 51); Twickenham, England
- Occupations: Playwright, actress
- Spouses: James Mowatt (m. 1834; died 1851); William Foushee Ritchie (m. 1853; died 1868)
- Writing career
- Pen name: "Isabel"; "Henry C. Browning"; "Helen Berkley"
- Notable work: Fashion

edidd

Anna Cora Mowatt Ritchie (née Ogden; after first marriage, Mowatt; after second marriage, Ritchie; pseudonyms, Isabel, Henry C. Browning, and Helen Berkley; March 5, 1819 – July 21, 1870) was a French-born American author, playwright, public reader, actress, and preservationist. Her best known work was the play Fashion, published in 1845. Following her critical success as a playwright, she enjoyed a successful career on stage as an actress. Her Autobiography of an Actress was published in 1853. Anna Cora Mowatt played a central role in lobbying and fundraising during the early years of the Mount Vernon Ladies' Association, the oldest national historic preservation organization in the United States.

== Childhood ==
Anna Cora Ogden was born in Bordeaux, France, on March 5, 1819. She was the tenth of fourteen children. Her father was Samuel Gouveneur Ogden (1779–1860), an American merchant. Her mother was Eliza Lewis Ogden (1785–1836), granddaughter of Francis Lewis, a signatory to the United States Declaration of Independence. In 1826, when Anna was six years old, the Ogden family returned to the United States. She attended private schools but was primarily educated at home. From a young age she was encouraged to read and showed a passion for writing and acting.

== Career ==
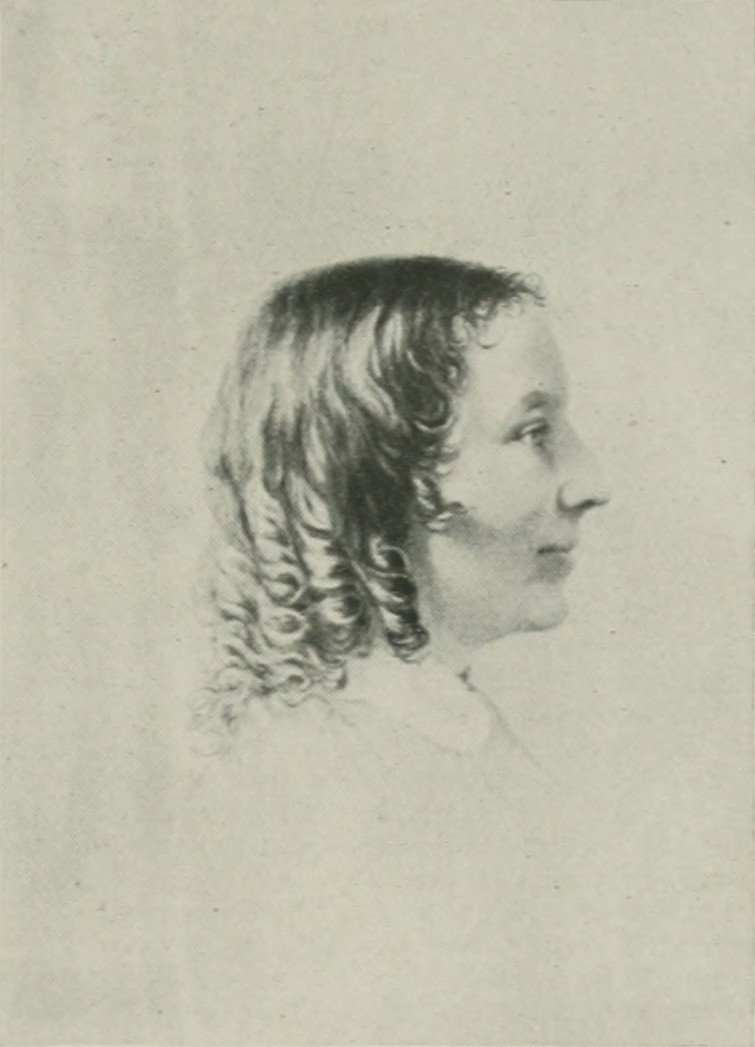
"A Woman of the Century"

On October 6, 1834, at age 15, Anna Cora Ogden eloped with James Mowatt (1805–1851), a New York lawyer. They moved to an estate in Flatbush (in present-day Brooklyn, New York)) where her husband encouraged her to continue her education and to write. She wrote of her elopement:

What could a girl of fifteen know of the sacred duties of a wife? With what eyes could she comprehend the new and important life she was entering? She had known nothing but childhood–had scarcely commenced her girlhood. What could she comprehend of the trials, the cares, the hopes, the responsibilities of womanhood? I thought of none of these things. I had always been lighthearted to the point of frivolity. I usually made a jest of everything–yet I did not look on this matter as a frolic. I only remembered I was keeping a promise. I had perfect faith in the tenderness of him to whom I confided myself. I did not in the least realize the novelty of my situation.

Anna Cora Mowatt's first book, Pelayo, or The Cavern of Covadonga, was published in 1836, then Reviewers Reviewed in 1837 using the pseudonym "Isabel". She wrote articles which were published in Graham's Magazine and Godey's Lady's Book and other periodicals. She wrote a six-act play, Gulzara, which was published in New World. Under the pseudonym Henry C. Browning, she wrote a biography of Goethe. Using the pseudonym "Helen Berkley", she wrote two novels: The Fortune Hunter and Evelyn. Evelyn is written in the epistolary style.

In 1841, due to financial problems, Anna became a public reader. Her first performance was attended by Edgar Allan Poe, who wrote of her, "A more radiantly beautiful smile is quite impossible to conceive." Her readings were popular and well attended, but her career as a reader was short lived due to respiratory problems. While recovering from her illness, she returned to her writing.

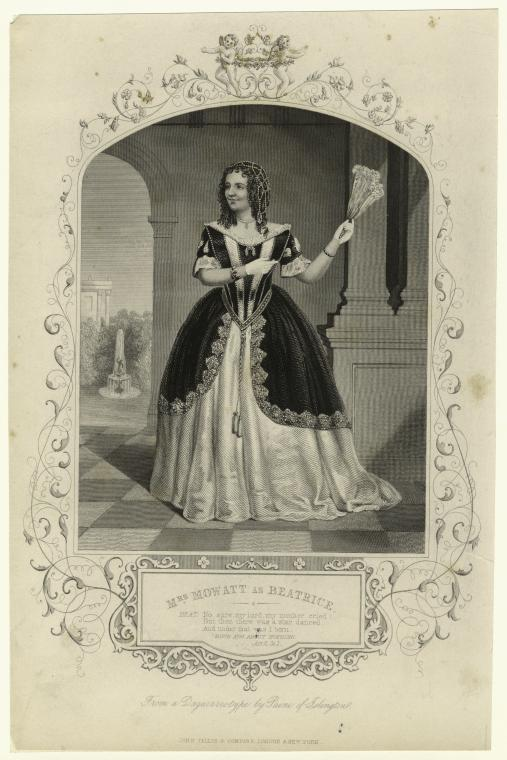
Engraving of Anna Cora Mowatt as Beatrice in Shakespeare's Much Ado About Nothing

In 1845, her best-known work, the play Fashion was published. It received rave reviews and opened at the Park Theatre, New York, on March 24, 1845. On June 13, 1845, she made another career move to acting, she debuted at the Park Theatre as Pauline in The Lady of Lyons with great success.

Although her next play, Armand, was published in 1847, and also received good reviews, she continued in her acting career. She performed leading roles in Shakespeare (for instance, in a production of Cymbeline in London, 1843), melodramas, and her own plays. She toured the United States and Europe for the next eight years.

On February 15, 1851, her husband, James Mowatt, died. After a short break, she resumed her acting career. In December 1853, her book Autobiography of an Actress was published. Anna Cora Mowatt's last appearance on the public stage was June 3, 1854.

== Later years ==
On June 7, 1854, Anna Cora Mowatt married William Foushee Ritchie (1813–1877), son of Thomas Ritchie. Their wedding was a lavish affair, attended by President of the United States, Franklin Pierce and his Cabinet.

During the next few years she wrote two more novels, Mimic Life, published in 1855 and Twin Roses, published in 1857. She played a prominent role in raising funds for the preservation of George Washington's home, Mount Vernon, serving as secretary of the Central Committee of the early Mount Vernon Ladies' Association.

She left her husband in 1860 and moved to Europe. She wrote the novel Mute Singer, published in 1861. She wrote Fairy Fingers, published in 1865. In 1865, she moved to England, where she wrote The Clergyman's Wife, and Other Sketches in 1867.

== Death ==
Anna Cora Mowatt Ritchie died in Twickenham, England, on July 21, 1870. She is buried in Kensal Green Cemetery in London, beside her first husband, James Mowatt.
