= Ann Pamela Cunningham =

Preservationist for George Washington's Mount Vernon (1816–1875)

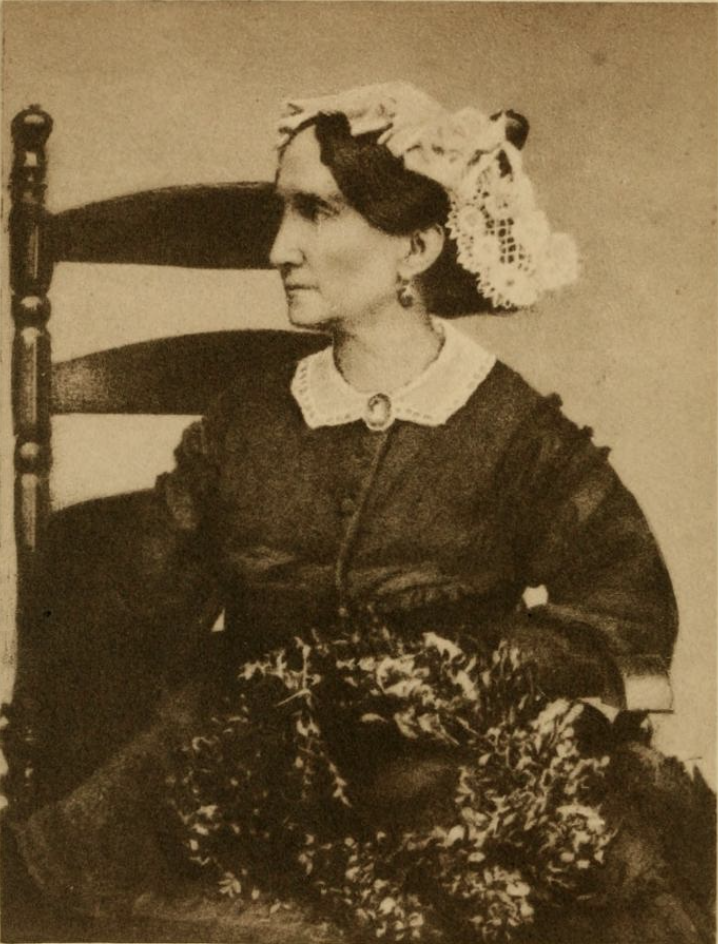
- Born: August 15, 1816; Rosemont Plantation, South Carolina
- Died: May 1, 1875 (aged 58)
- Burial place: First Presbyterian Church
- Known for: Founding The Mount Vernon Ladies' Association

Ann Pamela Cunningham (August 15, 1816 – May 1, 1875) was an American preservationist who founded The Mount Vernon Ladies' Association in 1853 and served for years as its first regent. She gained participation by women leaders from all 30 states of the Union at that time. The Association raised all the capital needed to complete its purchase of Mount Vernon by 1859 and took possession on February 22, Washington's birthday. The Association continues to own and operate Mount Vernon, George Washington's home and plantation.

== Biography ==
Cunningham was born in 1816, in Rosemont Plantation, South Carolina, to Louisa and Robert Cunningham and lived all her life on her parents' Rosemont Plantation in Laurens County, South Carolina. It was devoted to cotton cultivation. She was educated at home and learned to ride horses. Ladies then rode sidesaddle, and she was disabled as a teenager from a riding accident, which caused her parents to seek medical help for her in Philadelphia. Cunningham attended the Barhamville Institute in Columbia, South Carolina. She never married.

While passing Mount Vernon by steamboat on the Potomac River, her mother saw its deteriorated condition and wrote about it to Cunningham. She decided to take on the project of raising money to buy the property for preservation. Its owner at the time, John Augustine Washington III, revealed that speculators had offered him $300,000 for the property, and he had approached both Congress and Virginia's legislature to sell it and the surrounding 200 acres for $200,000, in order to preserved its public access. However, neither the Commonwealth of Virginia nor the federal Congress was willing to approve such purchases (both being preoccupied with the impending war).

Cunningham was in her 30s (and had been disabled for 21 years) when she initiated her campaign. On December 2, 1853, she wrote an open letter addressed to "the Ladies of the South," which the Charleston Mercury published. to raise money for the first president's home. She, former Massachusetts Governor Edward Everett and Sarah C. Tracy of Troy, New York with the help of Charleston attorney James Louis Petigru founded The Mount Vernon Ladies' Association, seeking representative women leaders from each of the 30 states in the union. Cunningham served as its first regent.

The Mount Vernon Ladies Association bought Mount Vernon, its outbuilding and 200 acres for $200,000. They were successful in raising all funds needed to complete the purchase from John A. Washington in 1859. This Association is the oldest private preservation organization in the United States. The group still owns and manages Washington's estate and is open to visitors 365 days a year.

She is buried at First Presbyterian Church in Columbia, South Carolina.
