= Mount Vernon Ladies' Association =

Non-profit organization preserving George Washington's former estate

- Logo used
- Formation: 1853
- Founder: Ann Pamela Cunningham
- Type: Nonprofit
- Location: United States
- Regent: Margaret Hartman Nichols

The Mount Vernon Ladies' Association of the Union (MVLA) is a non-profit organization that preserves and maintains the Mount Vernon estate originally owned by the family of George Washington. The association was founded in 1853 by Ann Pamela Cunningham of South Carolina, and is the oldest national historic preservation organization as well as the oldest patriotic women's society, in the United States.

Cunningham appointed 30 vice regents in the country, with one woman per state, who together raised $200,000 to purchase the property (equivalent to $4.1 million in 2003 dollars). The MVLA took over operation of the Mount Vernon estate on February 22, 1860, and opened the site as a museum. Through historic preservation of a national symbol, the Mount Vernon Ladies' Association hoped to transcend or "heal" the sectional divisions that were deepening over the issue of slavery in the United States. During the American Civil War, the MVLA's restoration efforts were put on hold, but resumed in 1866.

Today, the MVLA continues its original mission, relying solely on private contributions, and is overseen by a board of regents made up of women from 27 states.

== Background ==
After the deaths of George Washington in 1799 and his widow Martha in 1802, Mount Vernon remained in the Washington family for three generations. John Augustine Washington III, a great grandnephew of George Washington, eventually inherited the property, but he could not afford to maintain it. By the mid-1800s, the iconic Mansion House Farm had fallen into disrepair. In 1853, he offered to sell the estate to the Commonwealth of Virginia, which refused because the asking price was too high. John Augustine Washington also offered to sell Mount Vernon to the federal government, but key members of Congress argued that the government should not be responsible for preserving every historical site.

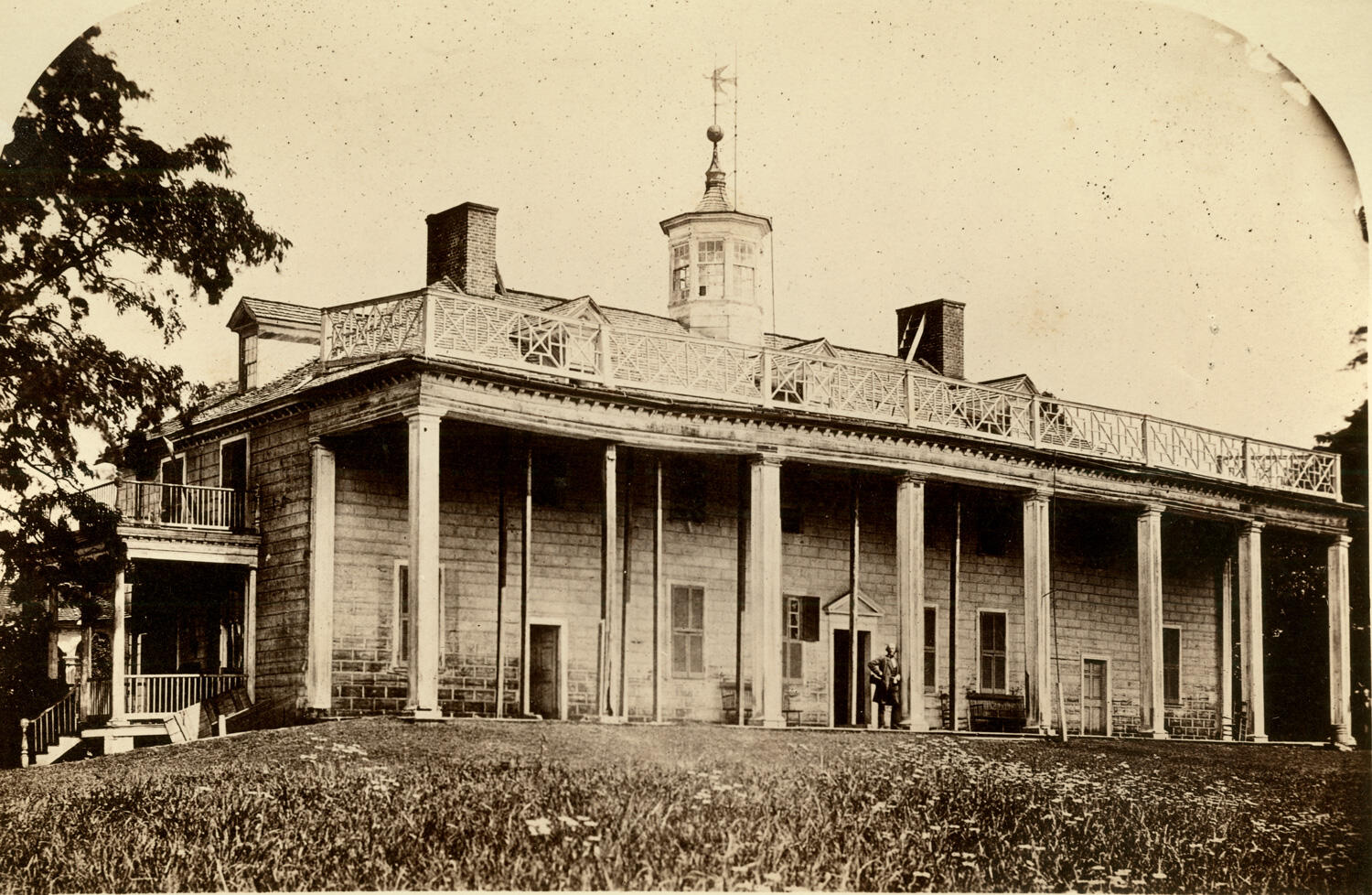
Photograph of George Washington's mansion in 1858 showing timbers and ship masts used to prop up the piazza roof

According to popular legend, on a moonlit night in 1853, Louisa Bird Cunningham was riding a steamboat on the Potomac River, when the ferry captain sounded the horn as they passed Mount Vernon. Cunningham, the mistress of Rosemont Plantation in South Carolina, was appalled to see the badly deteriorated condition of Washington's home. Writer Gerald W. Johnson later described the sight she saw:

The paint was peeling from the walls, the roof was sagging, at least one of the great pillars along the front had collapsed and been replaced by scantlings, the lawn was waist-high in rioting weeds. It was a picture of neglect, decay, and desolation, and the passenger could not get it out of her mind.

Cunningham had the idea that the site should be repaired and preserved as a national "shrine." The next day, Louisa wrote to her daughter, Ann Pamela Cunningham. According to the MVLA, she said:

If the men of America have seen fit to allow the home of its most respected hero to go to ruin, why can't the women of America band together to save it?

Galvanized by her mother's words, 37-year-old Ann Pamela Cunningham decided to take up the cause of rescuing and restoring Mount Vernon. The younger Cunningham, who suffered from chronic pain as the result of a horseriding accident, ignored the advice of friends and other relatives who initially tried to dissuade her in light of her poor health.

== Inception of fundraising campaign ==
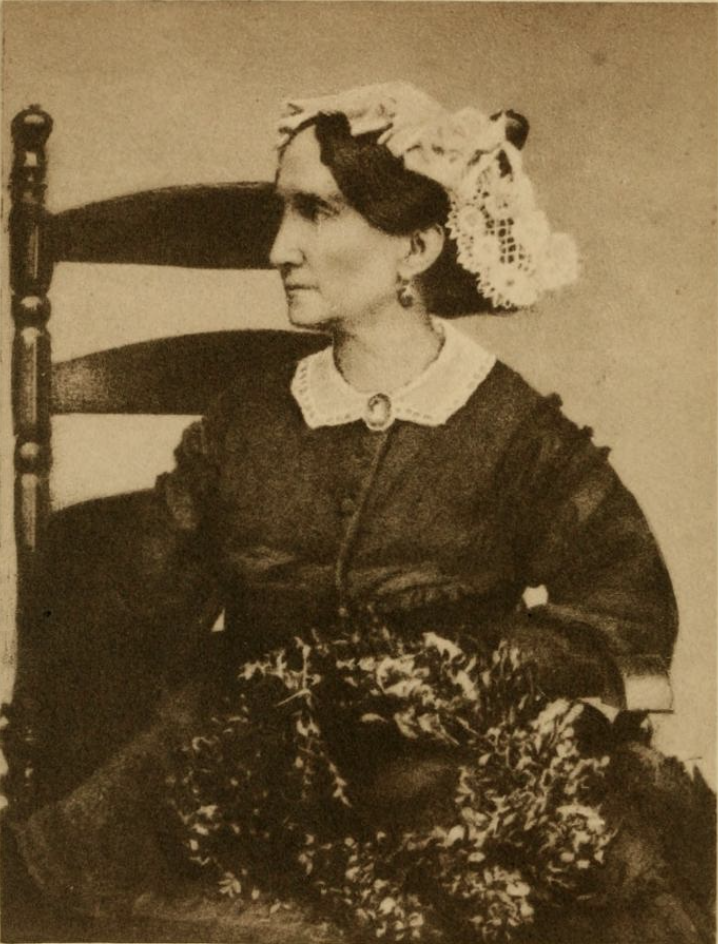
Ann Pamela Cunningham, founder and first regent of the Mount Vernon Ladies' Association

=== Initial focus on Southern states ===
At first, Ann Pamela Cunningham focused her efforts on mobilizing women from the American South to raise funds to save Mount Vernon. An initial concern was that "Northern capitalists" and speculators might intervene to purchase Mount Vernon and turn it into a hotel resort.

On December 2, 1853, Cunningham wrote an open letter titled "Appeal to the Ladies of the South" using the nom-de-plume "A Southern Matron". The letter was first published in the Charleston Mercury and subsequently appeared in other newspapers. In the letter, she urged other Southern women to join her in protecting the "sanctity" of Mount Vernon from desecration by greedy businessmen and corrupt politicians. Her argument that the virtuous, patriotic women of the republic should take action to safeguard a national symbol was particularly bold given the social norms of the time, which "deemed [it] improper for a lady to take part in public affairs."

Cunningham also wrote to Eleanor Washington to try to convince her husband to hold off on selling Mount Vernon until "the Southern ladies" raised the required funds, which they hoped to turn over to the governor of Virginia for the eventual purchase of the estate.

On February 22, 1854, the first public fundraising meeting took place in South Carolina in Cunningham's home, raising $293.75. On July 12, 1854, a second meeting to discuss for formation of an association took place in Richmond, Virginia, attended by 30 ladies and several gentlemen including Governor Joseph Johnson. Additional fundraising activity took place in Georgia and Alabama.

=== Inclusion of Northern women ===
By the fall of 1854, women from Northern states were expressing interest in joining the cause, saying that "Washington belonged to the whole country." Cunningham realized that she needed their help as well, given the difficulty of raising $200,000 to purchase Mount Vernon.

Keenly aware of the sensitivities between North and South, Ann Pamela Cunningham strove to make the movement more inviting and inclusive of Northern women without alienating her Southern supporters. Many including her own mother preferred to keep the effort to save Mount Vernon an "all Southern" affair. Cunningham argued that the virtue and patriotism of American women would enable them to reject and transcend the sectionalism which was threatening to tear the Union apart.

Sectional tensions surfaced nonetheless. The Philadelphia committee planned to distribute pamphlets stating that the title of Mount Vernon would be given to the U.S. Congress. When Cunningham informed them that title would be given to the state of Virginia, the Philadelphia committee "dropped the whole like a hot potato" and considered sending their own delegation to ask Congress to buy it instead.

Meanwhile, the Virginia state committee declared that as representatives of the "native state of Washington," it should be recognized as the predominant committee, undermining Cunningham's efforts to encourage Unionwide cooperation. Cunningham regarded the Virginia committee's actions as insubordinate and took steps to nullify their proceedings. The power struggle resulted in the resignation of Mary Anderson Gilmer, whose husband John H. Gilmer had argued that the inclusion of Northern women was an "unholy alliance" that would "tarnish the soil of Virginia with the polluted breath of Northern fanaticism."

=== Legislative charter ===
On the advice of John M. Berrien, a former U.S. senator from Georgia and attorney general under President Andrew Jackson, Ann Pamela Cunningham moved to establish the "Mount Vernon Association" as the equivalent of a modern nonprofit corporation. By acquiring a legislative charter from the Virginia General Assembly, Cunningham would also consolidate her position as the organization's principal officer.

Following the sudden death of Berrien, James L. Petigru, a former attorney general of South Carolina and a staunch unionist, took over drafting the charter, and inserted the word "Ladies'" and added "of the Union" to the name of the association.

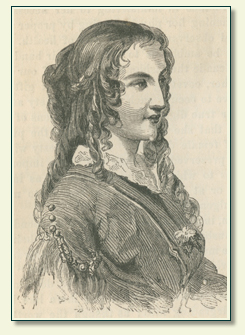
Anna Cora Mowatt served as secretary of the Central Committee of the early Mount Vernon Association

One of the key advocates of the 1856 charter was Anna Cora Mowatt, a well-known actress who had recently married William Foushee Ritchie, a son of Thomas Ritchie whose family was influential in Virginia state politics. Mrs. Ritchie had first met Cunningham in the fall of 1854 and promptly accepted the position of Secretary of the Central Committee of the early Mount Vernon Association. In the weeks leading up to the bill's introduction in the Virginia legislature, Anna Cora Mowatt Ritchie held many gatherings in her home to build male support for the MVLA. As Mrs. Ritchie reported to Cunningham:

I have been electioneering, and very successfully. Night before last I gave a musical soiree, and desired my husband to invite as many of the Senators and members of the legislature as the house would hold... Everyone declared he had a delightful evening. The music was excellent, and the supper good. Then came the grand coup. As the Ladies began to retire, Mrs. Pellet commenced the subject with [former] Governor Floyd, and I soon managed to make it general. Governor Floyd pledged himself to pass our bill and at once – so did all the other members and Senators present.

On March 15, 1856, O.W. Langfitt, an attorney from Richmond, Virginia, carried the bill to the Virginia legislature. The bill initially encountered opposition stirred by disgruntled former members of the Virginia committee who let it be known that there had been internal strife within the organization. In addition, there had been hostility and skepticism that such an ambitious and far-reaching plan was being spearheaded by a woman. In the absence of Cunningham, who was unwell and bedridden, Anna Cora Mowatt Ritchie stepped in to rally their allies to resume consideration of the bill and ultimately pass the association's founding charter.

On March 19, 1856, the Virginia state assembly passed a bill establishing the Mount Vernon Ladies' Association of the Union with Ann Pamela Cunningham named as the presiding leader. The charter also allowed the association to enter into a contract to hold title to the Mount Vernon estate.

== Nationwide organization ==
=== Appointment of vice regents in each state ===
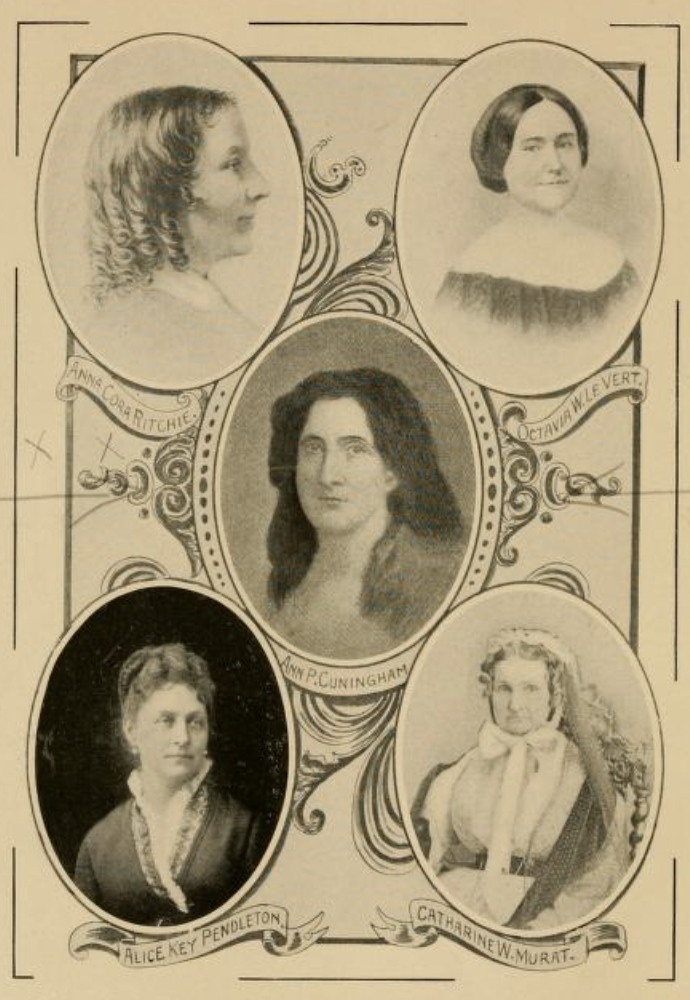
Early leaders of the Mount Vernon Ladies' Association

As regent of the newly established Mount Vernon Ladies' Association of the Union, Ann Pamela Cunningham turned to building the nationwide organization. Working with a small personal staff, she appointed a "Vice Regent" in each state to lead fundraising. In turn, each vice regents appointed "Lady Managers" to assist in specific areas within their state. The vice regents appointed by Cunningham generally came from wealthy backgrounds and were socially prominent, often from families with ancestral ties to the Founding Fathers of the United States. Returning once again to a familiar theme, Cunningham emphasized that the unique "sisterhood" she had assembled enabled would enable the MVLA to rise above sectional strife.

Historian Patricia West categorizes the early vice regents of the MVLA as preservationists, figureheads, and activists. Vice regents such as Anna Cora Mowatt Ritchie of Virginia and Octavia Walton Le Vert of Alabama took a keen interest in historical preservation, influenced by their own experiences in Europe. As an actress, Anna Cora Mowatt had been particularly enthusiastic about the preservation of the birthplace of William Shakespeare in Stratford-upon-Avon. Similarly, Madame Le Vert had been impressed with the preservation of the home of the poet Ludovico Ariosto in Ferrara, Italy, which had been purchased by the government and maintained as a "shrine" for those who wished to pay their respects.

In the category of figureheads, West includes Mary Chesnut, vice regent of South Carolina, who served from 1860 until her death in 1861. She was the mother-in-law of Civil War diarist Mary Boykin Chesnut, and had been a personal acquaintance of George Washington himself.

Notable among the activists was Mary Morris Hamilton of New York, the granddaughter of the U.S. Treasury Secretary Alexander Hamilton and the niece of U.S. Senator Gouverneur Morris. During her early years as vice regent, Hamilton managed to raise nearly $40,000, or one-fifth of the purchase price for Mount Vernon. Hamilton's lady managers for New York included Caroline C. Fillmore, the second wife of former President Millard Fillmore; former First Lady of New York Frances Adeline Seward; and the novelist Caroline Kirkland. In addition, the New York committee included the wives of the historian George Bancroft and architect Andrew Jackson Downing.

Other vice regents who contributed significantly to the cause included Louisa Ingersoll Gore Greenough of Massachusetts, who enlisted Anna Cora Mowatt to visit and do readings. Massachusetts managed to raise some $20,000 above and beyond any contribution credited to Everett. Octavia Le Vert of Alabama raised over $10,000; Margaret Gordon Blanding of California raised $9,500; Lily Lytle Macalester of Pennsylvania raised nearly $9,000; and North Carolina raised $8,000.

=== Other supporters ===
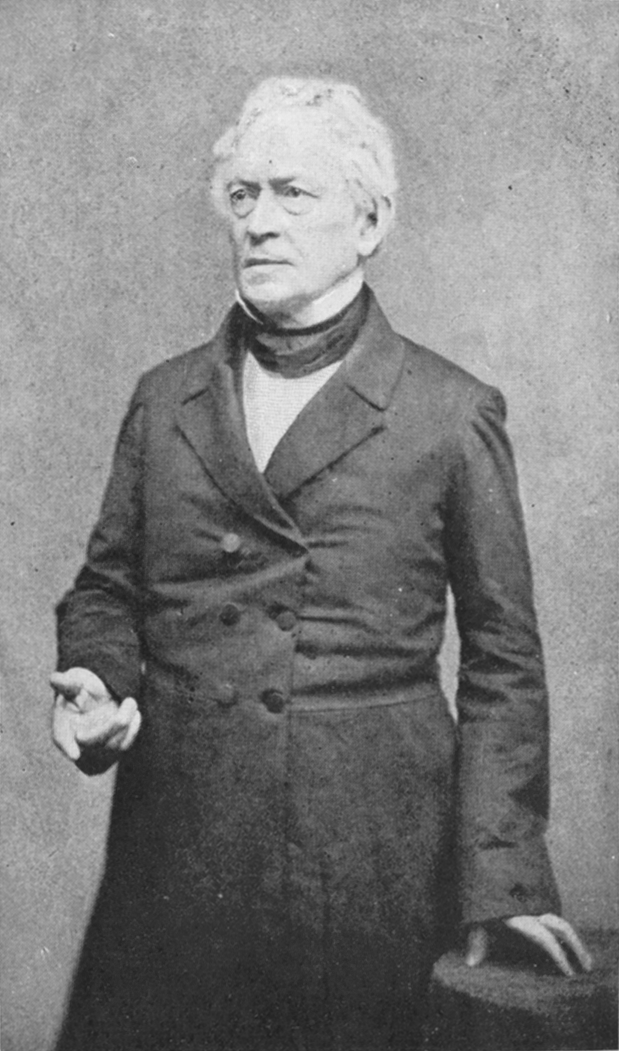
Former Governor of Massachusetts and Harvard University President Edward Everett toured the country to raise money for the MVLA

Edward Everett, a prominent politician who had served as U.S. Secretary of State, U.S. Senator, Governor of Massachusetts, and President of Harvard University, was an early proponent of the Mount Vernon Ladies' Association. He viewed Mount Vernon as a powerful rallying point for national unity and political moderation that could prevent a civil war.

A popular orator who would later become known as "the other speaker at Gettysburg," Everett toured the country to raise money for the MVLA. Between 1856 and 1860, he delivered his speech, "The Character of Washington," 137 times to fee-paying audiences. He also entered into a one-year contract with The New York Ledger to write a weekly column on American history in exchange for an advance of $10,000 to be paid to the Mount Vernon Ladies' Association.

Everett appointed three trustees in Boston to hold the money he raised and invest it, so it would earn interest. In the end, he contributed a total of $69,024, or a little more than one-third of the purchase price of Mount Vernon.

While Everett drummed up support among Northerners by portraying George Washington as a nationalist, Southern secessionist leader William Lowndes Yancey raised money for the MVLA by touring the Southern states with his own lecture praising Washington as a leader against government tyranny. A cousin of Ann Pamela Cunningham, Yancey was known for his "ferocious sarcasm" as an orator, and his uncompromising defense of the constitutional right to hold slaves. The Northern and Southern wings of the MVLA thus both appeared to celebrate the legacy of George Washington, while taking opposing stances on the issue of slavery and states' rights.

=== Opposition from other abolitionists ===
During their fundraising efforts, the vice regents of the Mount Vernon Ladies' Association faced opposition from abolitionists and others who objected to Mount Vernon's status as a slave plantation. Vice Regent Abba Isabella Chamberlain Little of Maine reported that some Northerners refused to contribute based on principle, even if it meant yielding Washington's legacy to the South. In Minnesota, Vice Regent Sarah Sibley found that the main obstacles to fundraising to be financial hardship resulting from the Panic of 1857; discomfort with the notion that a slave plantation could be a historical site of worthy of preservation; and tepidness from political opponents of her husband, Democratic Governor Henry Hastings Sibley.

In August 1858, suffragist Elizabeth Cady Stanton was widely applauded in abolitionist newspapers for refusing Mary Morris Hamilton's invitation to serve as the lady manager for upstate New York. Stanton stated that she was "pledged to a higher and holier work than building monuments, or gathering up the sacred memories of the venerated dead." Instead, she felt that actively working to abolish slavery in the United States was the "purest" tribute to Washington's memory. Similarly, in November 1858, Elizabeth B. Chace declined an invitation to serve as a lady manager for Rhode Island, pointing out the irony of upholding the "moral value" of Mount Vernon as a symbol of America's fight for liberty, when one in six women in America remained subject to slavery.

== Purchase of Mount Vernon ==
To the alarm of Ann Pamela Cunningham, shortly after the 1856 charter establishing the Mount Vernon Ladies' Association of the Union was passed by the Virginia General Assembly, John Augustine Washington abruptly withdrew the Mount Vernon estate from sale. He reportedly felt humiliated by the charter's stipulation that he should turn over his estate to the MVLA rather than to the state of Virginia; he was also clearly offended by the public criticism and personal attacks he had endured while the Virginia legislature considered his "exorbitant" asking price for Mount Vernon.

In June 1856, Cunningham visited John Augustine Washington in person to convince him to reconsider. Cunningham later wrote that she had persuaded Washington to change his mind by commiserating with his frustration that the state of Virginia had been unwilling to assume ownership of Mount Vernon, apparently moving him to tears. Meanwhile, John Augustine Washington wrote to William Foushee Ritchie that he still thought the MVLA's plan was "preposterous"; he predicted the women would mismanage the estate and that Mount Vernon would eventually revert to Virginia anyway.

For the next few years, Cunningham kept in regular contact with John Augustine Washington, assuring him that she was defending his honor – and his asking price for Mount Vernon – at every turn. On one occasion, she sent him a newspaper article in which she had rebuked John Augustine Washington's critics as "a band of 'abolitionists' playing into the hands of 'speculators'".

On April 6, 1858, John Augustine Washington III finally signed a contract to sell Mount Vernon to the MVLA. He agreed to sell the mansion, outbuildings, and 202 surrounding acres to the Association for $200,000. He took an immediate down payment of $18,000, with an additional $57,000 payable in December, and the remaining balance to be paid in four annual installments on February 22, which was George Washington's birthday.

John Augustine Washington continued to court national controversy when on December 25, 1858, he ran his third annual advertisement in the Alexandria Gazette offering the services of his seven slaves for hire. Editor Horace Greeley of the New York Tribune published a scathing article condemning his actions while encouraging the MVLA to finally take Mount Vernon away from his clutches. Other abolitionists questioned whether it made sense to contribute money if John Augustine Washington refused to free his slaves.

In the end, the Mount Vernon Ladies' Association of the Union met its fundraising target and paid the full amount in less than two years, despite the economic depression. John Augustine Washington and his family moved out of the mansion and the MVLA finally took possession of the estate on February 22, 1860.

== Civil War and post-war years ==
In 1874, Ann Pamela Cunningham wrote to the Mount Vernon Ladies' Association Council announcing her retirement as regent:

Ladies, the home of Washington is in your charge – see to it that you keep it the home of Washington. Let no irreverent hand change it; no vandal hands desecrate it with the fingers of progress. Those who go to the home in which he lived and died wish to see in what he lived and died. Let one spot in this grand country of ours be saved from change. Upon you rests this duty.

Preservation efforts continued through the second half of the nineteenth century. In 1881, Alice Mary Longfellow, eldest surviving daughter of poet Henry Wadsworth Longfellow, paid for the restoration and partial furnishment of Mount Vernon’s library. In 1888, women in Kansas raised $1,000 for the reconstruction of the servants’ quarters (presumably meaning slave quarters). Phoebe Hearst, mother of newspaper tycoon William Randolph Hearst, donated $6,000 to drain and fill a swamp near the mansion in 1895.

== Vice regents of Mount Vernon Ladies' Association to 1874 ==
The table below lists the first vice regents of the Mount Vernon Ladies' Association of the Union to 1874.

State	Vice Regent	Spouse	Term
Alabama	Octavia Walton Le Vert	Henry S. Le Vert	1858–1877
Arkansas	Sarah Frances Johnson	Robert Ward Johnson	1859–1862
Arkansas	Caroline Lauretta Drennan Scott	Charles Gordon Scott	1872–1888
California	Margaret Gordon Blanding	William Blanding	1859–1884
Connecticut	Mary Boott Goodrich	Samuel G. Goodrich	1858–1864
Connecticut	Susan E. Johnson Hudson		1870–1913
Delaware	Margaret Ann Douglas Comegys	Joseph P. Comegys	1858–1888
District of Columbia	Janet Madeleine Cecilia Shedden Riggs	George W. Riggs	1858–1868
District of Columbia	Matilda Emory		1869–1873
District of Columbia	Mary Thurston Faultenroy Barnes	Joseph K. Barnes	1873–1912
Florida	Catherine Daingerfield Willis Murat	Achille Murat	1858–1867
Florida	Nancy Wickliffe Yulee	David Levy Yulee	1868–1884
Georgia	Philoclea Edgeworth Casey Eve	William J. Eve	1858–1889
Illinois	Elizabeth Willard Barry	William Barry	1859–1883
Indiana	Harriet V. Saterlee Fitch	Graham Newell Fitch	1859–1880
Iowa	Jane Maria Yates Van Antwerp	Verplanck Van Antwerp	1858–1870
Kentucky	Rosa Vertner Jeffrey	Alexander Jeffrey	1858–1885
Louisiana	Margaretta Smith Wederstrandt Morse	Isaac E. Morse	1858–1872
Louisiana	Augusta Urquhart	David Urquehart	1873–1876
Maine	Abba Isabella Chamberlain Little	Josiah S. Little	1858–1866
Maine	Margaret Jane Mussey Sweat	Lorenzo De Medici Sweat	1866–1908
Maryland	Emily Harper	n/a	1866–1891
Massachusetts	Louisa Ingersoll Gore Greenough	Horatio Greenough	1858–1865
Michigan	Hannah Blake Farnsworth	Elon Farnsworth	1858–1877
Minnesota	Sarah Sibley	Henry Hastings Sibley	1859–1869
Mississippi	Catherine Anderson McWillie	William McWillie	1858–1873
Missouri	Elizabeth M. Walton	Robert R. Walton	1858–1867
Missouri	Anne Lucas Hunt	Wilson Price Hunt	1860–1878
Nevada	M. E. Hickman		1866–1874
New Hampshire	Sarah Kellogg King Hale	Salma Hale	1858–1861
New Hampshire	Mary Abbot Holbrook Stearns	Onslow Stearns	1866–1873
New Jersey	Phebe Anne Ogden	n/a	1858–1865
New Jersey	Nancy Marsh Halsted	Nathaniel Norris Halsted	1868–1891
New York	Mary Morris Hamilton	n/a	1858–1866
New York	Maria Brooks	James Brooks	1867–1876
North Carolina	Alice Hill London Dickinson	P. K. Dickinson	1858–1859
North Carolina	Letitia Harper Walker	William Richmond Walker	1859–1908
Ohio	Alice Key Pendelton	George H. Pendelton	1858–1863
Ohio	Emily R. McIlvaine Hewson		1866–1872
Pennsylvania	Lily Lytle Macalester Laughton	M. Berghman	1859–1891
Pennsylvania	Lily Lytle Macalester Laughton	J. Scott Laughton	1859–1891
Rhode Island	Abby Wheaton Pearce Chace	George Ide Chace	1858–1893
South Carolina	Mary Cox Chesnut	James Chesnut, Sr.	1860–1861
Tennessee	Mary Rutledge Fogg		1858–1872
Texas	Ella Hutchins	Seabrook W. Sydnor	1866–1872
Texas	Mary Maverick		1873
Virginia	Anna Cora Mowatt Ritchie	William Foushee Ritchie	1858–1866
Virginia	Betsy C. Mason		1870–1873
Virginia	Emma Reed Ball		1874
West Virginia	Ella Bassett Washington		1870–1898
Wisconsin	Martha Reed Mitchell		1858–1902

== Other preservation projects ==
=== Preservation of view ===
Congresswoman Frances P. Bolton, who served as Vice Regent from Ohio from 1938 to 1977, launched an effort in the 1940s to preserve the view across the Potomac River. The Association purchased 750 acres (3.0 km^{2}) along the (opposite) Maryland shore, which became the nucleus of the 4,000-acre (16 km^{2}) Piscataway Park. This has helped preserve the landscape as the Washingtons would have seen it.

=== Books owned by George Washington ===
On June 22, 2012, the Association purchased Washington's personal copy of the United States Constitution at auction for $9.8 million. The bound volume was specially printed for Washington in 1789, his first year in office as president, and contains his handwritten notes and markings. George Washington books and manuscripts purchased by the Mount Vernon Ladies' Association are safeguarded in The Fred W. Smith National Library for the Study of George Washington.

== Awards ==
- 2002 National Humanities Medal

== Sources ==
- "Annual report" – The Mount Vernon Ladies' Association of the Union (1896)
- "Portraits/Biographies of Regent and Vice Regents to 1874", MVLA – Portraits & Bios
- "Mount Vernon Lands Diminish", Old and Sold, 1925
- Thane, Elswyth (1966). Mount Vernon is Ours: The Story of the Preservation and Restoration of Washington's Home. New York: Duell, Sloan and Pearce.
