= James Wood Davidson =

American author

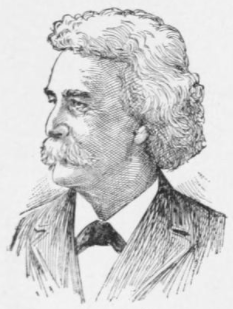
- Born: March 9, 1829; Newberry County
- Died: June 27, 1905; Chattahoochee
- Education: University of South Carolina
- Occupation: Writer

James Wood Davidson (March 9, 1829 – June 27, 1905) was a United States author.

== Biography ==
James Wood Davidson was born in Newberry District, South Carolina on March 9, 1829. He graduated from South Carolina College, Columbia, in 1852, studied languages under private tutors, from 1854 to 1859 was professor of Greek in Mount Zion College, Winnsboro, South Carolina, and in 1859 became principal of Carolina High School, Columbia. From 1862 to 1863, he was adjutant of infantry in Jackson's corps of Lee's army. He left Columbia in 1871, and lived two years in Washington, D.C., and eleven years in New York City, where he was literary editor of the Evening Post in 1873, and American correspondent of the London Standard from 1873 to 1878. In 1884, he moved to Figulus in Dade County, Florida, where he continued his literary work, and engaged in fruit culture. In 1885, he was a member of the Florida constitutional convention. After 1887, he was employed in the Treasury Department at Washington, as a clerk.

James Wood Davidson died in Chattahoochee on June 23, 1905.

== Works ==
- Living Writers of the South (New York, 1869)
- School History of South Carolina (Columbia, 1869; new ed., 1886)
- The Correspondent (New York, 1886)

He edited:

- William M. Martin, Lyrics and Sketches (1865)
- The Educational Year-Book (1872)
