= Renouf =

Renouf is a family name of Norman origin. The name derives from the Norse settlement of Normandy, from the Old Norse words 'ragn' (council, advisor) and 'ulf' (wolf).

People with this name include:

- Alan Renouf (1919–2008), Australian government official
- Annie Renouf-Whelpley (1849–1930), American artist, singer, and composer
- Brent Renouf (born 1988), Australian footballer
- Clem Renouf (1921–2020), Australian accountant, President of Rotary International (1978–79)
- Cyril Renouf, Jersey lawn bowler
- Dan Renouf (born 1994), Canadian ice hockey player
- Edda Renouf (born 1943), American painter
- Edith Renouf (1864-1956), Guernsey philanthropist
- Edward Renouf (artist) (1906–1999), American iron sculptor
- Edward Renouf (chemist) (1846–1934), American chemistry professor
- Émile Renouf (1845–1894), French painter and draughtsman
- Frank Renouf (1918–1998), New Zealand businessman
- George Renouf (1878–1961), Canadian politician
- Henry Renouf (1820–1880), Newfoundland politician
- Jim Renouf (1940–1977), Australian rules footballer
- Joan Renouf (1944–2025), Jersey lawn bowler
- Jonathan Renouf, Jersey politician
- L. P. W. Renouf (1887–1968), Irish biologist
- Marcel Renouf (born 1953), French civil servant
- Matthew Renouf (born 1993), Guernsey cricketer
- Michèle Renouf (born 1946), Australian-born Holocaust denier
- Nora Renouf (1881-1959), British pharmaceutical chemist
- Peter le Page Renouf (1822–1897), British Egyptologist
- Rex Renouf (1911–1971), Canadian politician
- Steve Renouf (born 1970), Australian rugby player
- Susan Renouf (born 1940), Australian socialite and wife of Frank
- Thomas Renouf (1878–1955), English professional golfer
- Timothy Renouf (born 1989), British actor
- Vincent Adams Renouf (1876–1910), American-born history and chemistry professor in Qing China
- W. C. Renouf (1868–1954), British Indian Civil Service
