= Whelpley =

Whelpley is a surname. Notable people with the surname include:

- Edward W. Whelpley (1818–1864), Chief Justice of New Jersey
- James Davenport Whelpley (1817–1872), Presbyterian minister
- Samuel Whelpley (1766–1817), Presbyterian minister
- Annie Renouf-Whelpley (1849-1930) American artist, singer and composer
- Mary Taylor Whelpley (1866-1949) American aviator, painter and sculptor
