= Edward Renouf =

Edward Renouf may refer to:

- Edward Renouf (chemist)
- Edward Renouf (artist)
