= George H. Colton =

19th century American newspaper editor

George Hooker Colton
- Born: October 15, 1818; Westford, New York, U.S.
- Died: December 1, 1847 (aged 29)
- Education: Yale University
- Occupation: Newspaper editor
- Years active: 1840–1847
- Known for: Founding the American Whig Review
- Political party: Whig Party

George Hooker Colton (October 15, 1818 – December 1, 1847) was an American newspaper editor who founded The American Review: A Whig Journal in 1844. Colton served as the American Whig Review's editor from 1844 until his death in 1847, publishing from New York City. After Colton's death, James Davenport Whelpley took over as chief editor.

== Early life ==
George Hooker Colton was born in Westford, New York on October 15, 1818.

Colton attended Yale University and graduated in 1840. After graduating, Colton was briefly a teacher in New Haven, Connecticut before publishing his poem "Tecumseh".

== American Whig Review ==
George Colton founded The American Review: A Whig Journal in 1844 as a monthly periodical published by Wiley and Putnam. Colton was a Whig and founded the review to further the Whig Party's political objectives. The American Review first published in Autumn 1844 but was serialized starting in January 1845.

=== Relationship with Edgar Allan Poe ===
In February 1845, Edgar Allan Poe sold his famous poem "The Raven" to Colton's journal after Poe's friend George Rex Graham declined to publish it. Poe continued to publish his poems and other writings through Colton, including the short stories "Some Words with a Mummy" and "The Facts in the Case of M. Valdemar".

The literary relationship between Poe and Colton continued when, in May 1846, Poe harshly critiqued Colton's poem "Tecumseh". Poe called "Tecumseh" "insufferably tedious", however, Poe offered a shining review of Colton's American Review in the same breadth.

=== Mexican-American War ===
In the January 1847 edition of The American Review, one of his last, Colton sharply criticized President James K. Polk over the Mexican–American War. Colton, previously supportive of President Polk, turned against his administration, declaring "[W]e are sick of following the president through the sort of defence he has ventured to set up for invading Mexico."

== Death ==
George Hooker Colton died December 1, 1847, remaining The American Review's "able editor" until death. Colton's death was announced in the subsequent edition of The American Review, where longtime colleague James Davenport Whelpley pledged to succeed Colton.
