= Edward Renouf (chemist) =

American chemist & professor (1846–1934)

- Born: September 4, 1846; Lowville, New York, U.S.
- Died: November 1, 1934 (aged 88); Warwick Parish, Bermuda
- Education: University of Freiberg
- Scientific career
- Fields: Professor of chemistry
- Workplaces: Johns Hopkins University

Edward Renouf (September 4, 1846 – November 1, 1934) was an American chemist and chemistry professor, known for having helped found the chemistry department and research laboratory at Johns Hopkins University, and for his authorship of chemistry textbooks.

== Life and career ==
Edward Renouf was born at Lowville, New York, on September 4, 1846, the son of Rev. Edward Augustus Renouf and his wife, Harriet Fuller Lester. The father was born at Boston, Massachusetts in 1818, attended the Boston Grammar School, the Boston Latin School (enrolled 1829), and Harvard College (A.B. 1838, M.A. 1841). He was ordained a priest in the Protestant Episcopal Church in 1842, and according to one obituary, Rev. Renouf enjoyed traveling, "had visited almost all the countries in the world, and had become familiar with their languages and the habits of their peoples." He seemingly bequeathed these peripatetic habits to his son, who lived in Europe much of his adult life; and to his grandson Vincent Adams Renouf who was born in Germany, grew up there, and for several years taught history at a Chinese university.

In 1857, the younger Edward Renouf enrolled in the Boston Latin School. In 1863, he went abroad to study at Heidelberg University, the University of Jena, and the Ludwig-Maximilians-Universität München, and in 1880, received the degree of Doctor of Philosophy from the University of Freiberg. He began his career as an assistant professor, teaching chemistry at the Ludwig-Maximilians-Universität München, where he remained until 1885, when he returned to the United States to join the faculty of Johns Hopkins University. In 1886, he became an associate professor, and in 1892 full professor. In 1887, Renouf translated Jacob Volhard's Experiments in General Chemistry. In 1894, he wrote Inorganic Preparations, both of which were used as textbooks by the chemistry department at Johns Hopkins. He taught there until he retired in 1911.

== Personal life ==
Edward Renouf married at Boston on February 8, 1871, Annie Vincent Whelpley, the daughter of physician and author James Davenport Whelpley and his wife, Anna Marie Wells. Annie Whelpley was born in New York City, but had Boston roots: The poets Thomas Wells and Anna Maria (Foster) Wells were her grandparents, and Gov. Samuel Adams was her great-great-grandfather. According to one writer, she was "an accomplished singer and artist." Among the oil paintings exhibited in Chicago at the World's Columbian Exposition of 1893 was No. 1098, Portrait of Mlle. Hausen, by A. Renouf-Whelpley.

The couple had two children: Edward Davenport Renouf (1872–1954), born in Boston, and Vincent Adams Renouf (1876–1910), born in Düsseldorf.

When Edward Renouf returned to the United States in 1885 to teach at Johns Hopkins, he and Annie Renouf effectively separated. In her passport application in 1915, she submitted an affidavit explaining her protracted stay abroad:

I ceased to reside in the United States about 1881 ... I have since resided temporarily at Germany, Austria, Italy and Switzerland ... I arrived at Locarno, Switzerland where I am now temporarily residing in December 1915; I came to Europe to engage in my work as a painter and composer and am now obliged to remain here on account of my health .... I maintain the following ties of family in the United States: husband, professor Edward Renouf, Monkton, Maryland and brother: James Davenport Whelpley, c/o Century Magazine, New York ... my husband owns real estate and I receive $1,500 annually from him.

Annie Renouf died at Florence, Italy on May 4, 1930.

In June 1933, when arriving at New York from Bermuda, Edward Renouf gave his address as "The Old Mill House," Brewster, New York. He died on November 1, 1934.

== Written works ==
Books and articles authored or translated by Edward Renouf include:

- Edward Renouf (author, PhD thesis, University of Freiberg), Ueber das dimethyl-hydrazin (Munich: R. Oldenbourg, 1881).
- Jacob Volhard (author), Clemens Zimmermann (author), Edward Renouf (translator), Experiments in General Chemistry and Introduction to Chemical Analysis (Baltimore: Johns Hopkins University Publication Agency, 1887).
- Jacob Volhard (author), Clemens Zimmermann (author), Edward Renouf (translator), Experiments in General Chemistry and Introduction to Chemical Analysis (Baltimore: Johns Hopkins University Publication Agency, 1889), an abbreviated edition.
- Edward Renouf, Inorganic Preparations (Baltimore: Johns Hopkins Press, 1894).
- Edward Renouf, "The Use of Acetylene,” in Popular Science Monthly, Vol. 55, July 1899, pp. 335–347.
- Edward Renouf, "Some Phases of the Earth's Development in the Light of Recent Chemical Research,” in Popular Science Monthly, July 1900, p. 295.

== See also ==
- Vincent Adams Renouf, educator and historian; Edward Renouf's son.
- James Davenport Whelpley, physician and author; Edward Renouf’s father-in-law.
- Mary Taylor Brush, artist and aviator; Edward Renouf's sister-in-law.
- Edward Renouf, artist; Edward Renouf’s grandson.
- Edda Renouf, artist; Edward Renouf’s great-granddaughter.
