= William Robert Pearmain =

American painter and activist

William Robert Pearmain (1888 – September 28, 1912) was an American painter and activist. He grew up in Dublin, New Hampshire, where he was neighbor of George de Forest Brush. He left Harvard University, to study painting, with Brush in Italy. He married Nancy Brush in 1909. He joined the Industrial Workers of the World and worked for the Westinghouse Electric Company in Pittsburgh.

He died from leukemia in Framingham, Massachusetts on September 28, 1912.

His papers are held at the Archives of American Art.
