= Matt Urban =

United States Army Medal of Honor recipient (1919–1995)

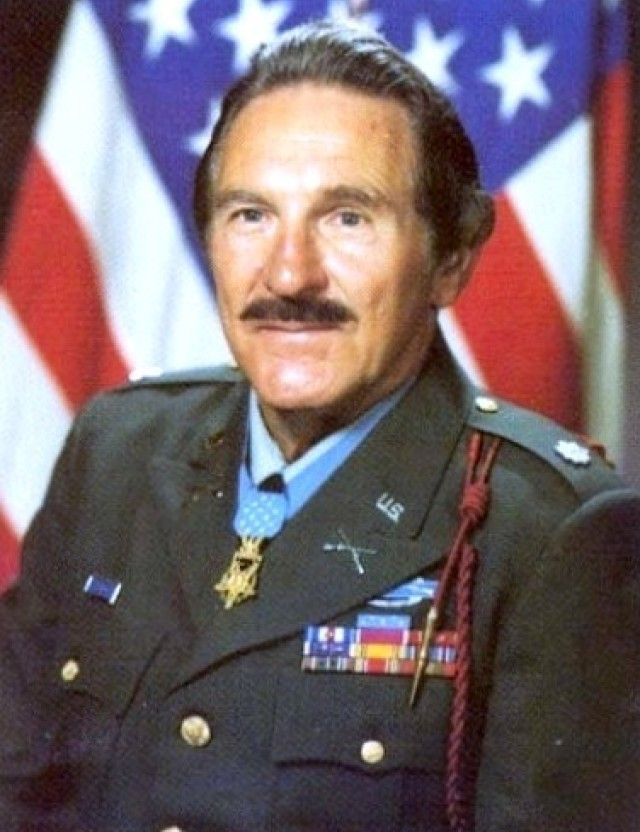
- Urban wearing his Army uniform after receiving the Medal of Honor in 1980
- Born: Matt Louis Urbanowicz; August 25, 1919; Buffalo, New York, U.S.
- Died: March 4, 1995 (aged 75); Holland, Michigan, U.S.
- Burial place: Arlington National Cemetery
- Military career
- Allegiance: United States
- Branch: United States Army
- Service years: 1941–1946
- Rank: Lieutenant colonel
- Nicknames: "Matty" "The Ghost"
- Commands: 2nd Battalion, 60th Infantry, 9th Infantry Division
- Conflicts: World War II: North Africa Campaign; Sicily Campaign; Operation Overlord
- Awards: Medal of Honor; Silver Star (2); Legion of Merit; Bronze Star Medal (3, 1 "V" Device; Purple Heart (7); Croix de Guerre with star (France); Croix de Guerre with palm (France)

Matt Louis Urban (August 25, 1919 – March 4, 1995) was a United States Army lieutenant colonel and one of the most decorated American soldiers of World War II. Urban performed valiantly in combat on many occasions despite being wounded in action several times. He received over a dozen personal decorations for combat, including seven Purple Hearts. In 1980, he received the Medal of Honor and three other U.S. decorations and one foreign decoration for his actions in France and Belgium in 1944.

== Early years ==
Matt Urban was born Matthew Louis Urbanowicz in Buffalo, New York. His father Stanley was a Polish immigrant and a plumbing contractor. His mother Helen was born in Depew, New York. Urban was baptized at Corpus Christi Church and lived at 1153 Broadway while growing up. He attended East High School in Buffalo, and graduated in 1937. He had three brothers: Doctor Stanley (Urbanowicz) Urban, Arthur (Urbanowicz) Urban, and Eugene, who died in 1927 from appendicitis.

In the fall of 1937, Urban enrolled at Cornell University in Ithaca, New York. He majored in history and government with a minor in community recreation. He graduated on June 14, 1941, with a Bachelor of Arts degree; during his last year, he used the name Matty L. Urbanowitz. While at Cornell University, he was a member of the Reserve Officers Training Corps (ROTC), the track and boxing teams, and the Kappa Delta Rho fraternity.

== Military service ==
The U.S. Army service records for Urban use both "Matt Urban" and "Matty Louis (L.) Urbanowitz". The name "Matt Louis Urban" was engraved on the front of his original white Arlington National Cemetery headstone. His current and private grave monument at Arlington National Cemetery uses the name "Matt L. Urban".

Urban was commissioned a second lieutenant of infantry in the U.S. Army on May 22, 1941, and entered active duty on July 2, 1941, at Fort Bragg, North Carolina. He first assignment was as a platoon leader of D Company, 2nd Battalion, 60th Infantry Regiment, 9th Infantry Division. While at Fort Bragg, he founded the newsletter for the 60th Infantry.

=== World War II ===
Urban served as a first lieutenant and captain in six campaigns during World War II, and was severely wounded his seventh time while charging an enemy machine gun position on 3 September 1944, in Belgium. He was promoted to first lieutenant on February 1, 1942, captain on April 30, 1943, major on October 2, 1944, and lieutenant colonel on October 2, 1945. He was medically retired from the U.S. Army on February 26, 1946.

Beginning at Fort Bragg, Urban served as a platoon leader. During the war he was a morale/special services officer, a platoon leader, a company executive officer and company commander, and a battalion executive officer and battalion commander of the 60th Infantry Regiment (the "Go Devils"), 9th Infantry Division ("Old Reliables").

==== North Africa ====
Urban first went into combat when he made the beach landing under fire with another soldier on a raft on November 8, 1942, the first day of the invasion of North Africa, of the North Africa Campaign. Along with a Purple Heart, one of the first medals he received during the war was a Silver Star.

While serving with the Second Battalion, 60th Infantry, he was wounded in action seven times. A member of his unit, Sergeant Earl G. Evans, wrote "the major, only a lieutenant at the time, was wounded in Maknassy, Tunisia and refused to be evacuated. He followed up this refusal by taking out a combat patrol. At another time in Tunisia, our battalion successfully halted a German counterattack, and it was through the major's efforts that we succeeded. As our outfit was falling back, the major held his ground and grabbed the closest German. He killed him with a trench knife, took the German's machine pistol, and fired at the onrushing enemy." During the German counterattack Urban was wounded by grenade shrapnel.

==== Sicily ====
The 60th Infantry disembarked from Africa on July 28, 1943, on the USS Orizaba, and arrived at Palermo, Sicily, on July 31, after the invasion of Sicily by an American amphibious landing force on July 9 and the Allied invasion of Italy on July 10. German planes raided the harbor and the Orizaba was also attacked by German planes in the early morning of August 1 before Urban's unit disembarked from the ship that day. Urban, on deck at the time, replaced an anti-aircraft gunnery crew's spotter who was machine-gunned by a German Stuka dive bomber. Using the badly wounded spotter's binoculars, Urban spotted the plane returning and the gun crew was able to shoot it down.

After the invasion of Sicily, the Germans were entrenched in a fortified mountain stronghold where the 1st Infantry Division got bogged down by the difficult terrain. The 60th Infantry and 4th Tabor of Goumiers were given the mission of crossing the mountains in central Sicily undetected to flank the Germans. Urban's company and battalion successfully spearheaded 4,000 men with pack-mules single file by night, which caught the Germans off guard and caused them to retreat from Troina to the next line of defense at Randazzo.

A battle would have cost hundreds of American lives. Sicily was liberated on August 20. On September 5, Urban was presented a Silver Star in Sicily, before the 9th Infantry Division was sent back to England on November 8 for a rest and to re-equip and train for the Invasion of Normandy.

==== France ====
Urban and the 2nd Battalion, 60th Infantry landed on Utah Beach on June 11, 1944. On June 14, Urban's company attacked German positions near Renouf, France. As F Company was hit by heavy enemy small arms and tank fire, Urban picked up a bazooka after the bazooka gunner was shot, and persuaded the gunner's ammo carrier to accompany him through the hedgerows to a point near the oncoming tanks. Exposing himself to the enemy, he knocked out two German tanks, and the company moved forward and routed the enemy. Later that day, while advancing near Orglandes, Urban was struck in the left leg by shrapnel by direct fire from a German tank who spotted and aimed towards him before he could fire the bazooka. Urban refused to be evacuated after a medic attended him, and continued directing his company from position to position while being carried by his men sitting down on a stretcher.

The next day, he was wounded in the right forearm and attended in the field by the 2nd Battalion doctor, who had him evacuated to a field hospital surgical tent where Urban underwent surgery on his left calf by two doctors using lanterns for light. Urban was then shipped to England for further treatment on a troop carrier. While Urban was recovering at a hospital in England in July 1944, he learned from casualties from his battalion that they had been taking severe losses in the hedgerows of France, and were lacking experienced combat officers. In order to go back to his men instead of being sent back to the United States because of his leg injury, he took charge of training forty soldiers near the hospital who were soon being sent to Normandy. He left with them on a troop carrier.

On July 25, after arriving and dropping the soldiers off for combat duty on Normandy in the morning, he began hitchhiking his way from Utah Beach to his company and battalion near Saint-Lô, France, as the breakout from Normandy (July 25–31, 1944) was about to commence, with the 9th Division in the lead. Urban, limping and using a stick he made as a cane, reached the 2nd Battalion to find that the unit was checked by strong enemy opposition after their attack began. German machine guns and an anti-tank gun had them pinned down. He then got men moving again so they would not be killed in their foxholes and ditches.

He helped a soldier pull a wounded and pinned-down Sherman tank driver out of his burning tank before it exploded. He located another American support tank which was still operable, but its gun was not manageable and its turret gunner had been wounded. The tank was stalled because of crossfire from a German machinegun and an anti-tank gun positioned on top of a hill which had destroyed another tank.

Urban was told by a tank platoon lieutenant that the driver was still inside the tank. The lieutenant and then a tank platoon sergeant were both machine-gunned and killed while attempting to get to the tank's turret and its 50-caliber machine gun. Urban crawled alongside the tank and was able to get to and man the tank turret under fire. He ordered the tank driver to advance in high gear, and as the tank jumped off, he fired on the German machine gun emplacement. The anti-tank gun also started firing at Urban, but was not able to hit him or disable his tank. The 2nd Battalion rallied behind Urban and advanced into the valley in a unified assault.

Urban destroyed more machinegun positions and the 2nd Battalion overran the Germans lines with hand-to-hand and bayonet fighting causing many German soldiers to surrender. The 2nd Battalion commander, Max L. Wolf, witnessed the action from his command post on another hill with his binoculars and recommended Urban for the Medal of Honor for spearheading the 2nd Battalion's Saint-Lô breakthrough and saving many lives. Urban was then made the executive officer of the battalion.

Staff Sergeant Evans, who was assigned to the 2nd Battalion command post on July 25, 1944, wrote up Urban's recommendation for Wolf. On July 5, 1945, Evans wrote The Pentagon about Urban actions after Evans was released from a German prisoner-of-war camp, saying in part: "Urban move forward, and damned if the U.S. Army didn't move forward also. He bellied up to the tank and amid heavy gunfire scrambled aboard and manned the machine gun. The driver took heart with Urban aboard. The tank roared forward, and Urban tore the hillside apart with that gun. The men, once again with 'Urban-itis' scrambled up the rise and gained the objective."

On August 2, Urban was wounded in the chest by a shell fragment that narrowly missed his heart. He again refused to be evacuated to a hospital. On August 6, Wolf was killed in action near Cherbourg, France, and Urban, only 24 years old, assumed command of the battalion. Urban was wounded again by shrapnel on August 15, but remained with his unit. The 60th Infantry was awarded the French Croix de Guerre with palm for the period of June 11–18, 1944.

==== Belgium ====
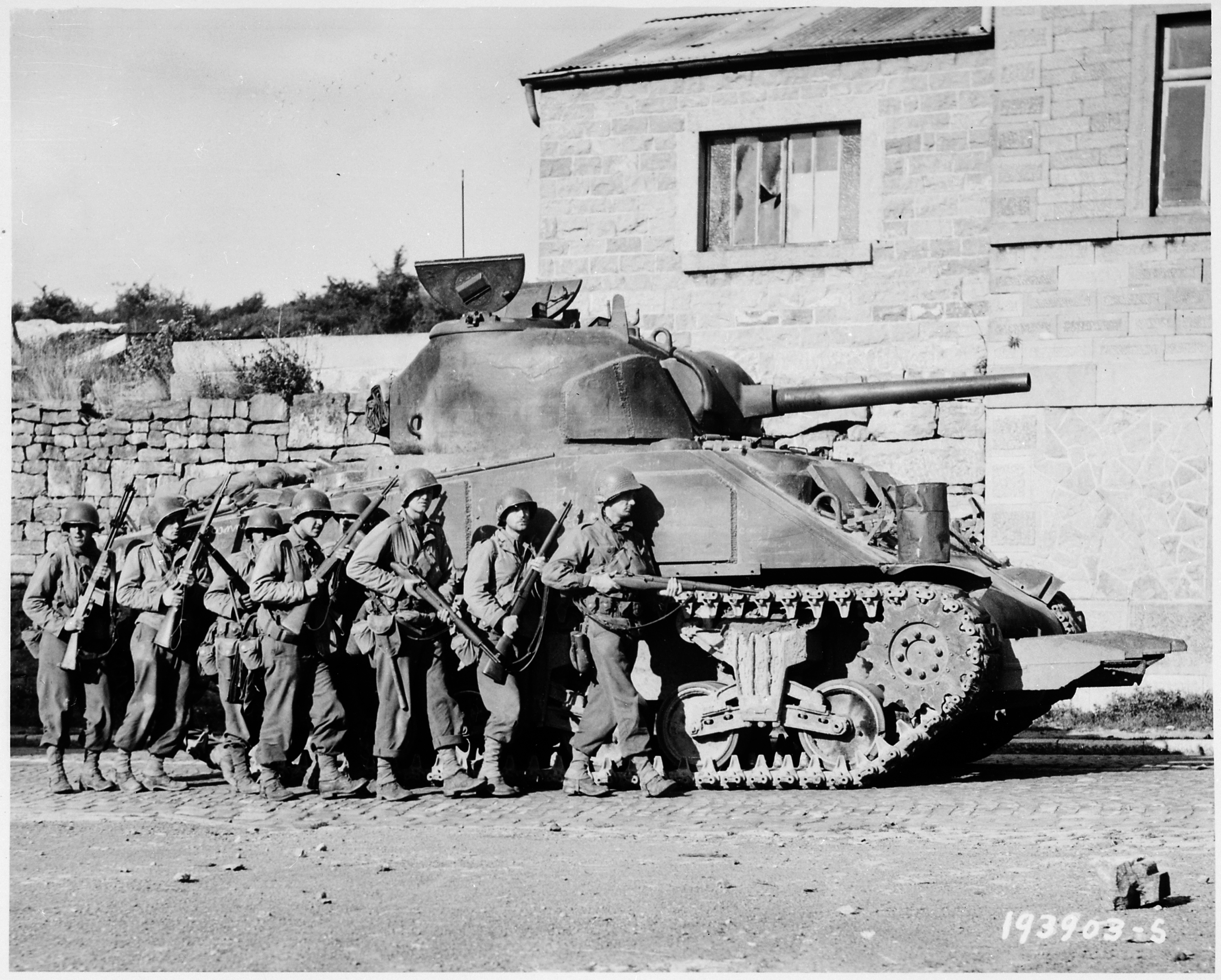
60th Infantry soldiers alongside of a Sherman "Rhino" tank in Belgium

On September 2, 1944, the 2nd Battalion was assigned to a regiment of another infantry division. After Urban and his battalion dug in one mile from Philippeville, Belgium, Urban met with the division's commanding officer, a brigadier general, who ordered Urban and his 2nd Battalion to attack Philippeville the next morning.

Urban and two others scouted the village and found at least a regiment-sized German force there which was well defended with machine guns, tanks, and antiaircraft guns aimed down the one road leading to the village. On September 3, Urban and his battalion attacked Philippeville after getting the artillery cover he requested from the general. While charging at a forward enemy machinegun emplacement with two grenades, he was shot through the neck, permanently disabling his larynx.

One of Urban's men got to him and immediately plugged and bandaged his two neck wounds. Another soldier arrived and both soldiers dragged Urban one hundred yards to a muddy ditch while under fire from another German machinegun as the battle raged. The 2nd Battalion doctor and chaplain arrived. The doctor gave Urban plasma and performed a tracheotomy on him. The chaplain gave Urban last rites after the doctor nodded to him that Urban would not live. On September 4, Urban was carried off the battlefield to a field hospital tent.

Urban spent a few weeks in a field hospital in France before being sent back to England for further recovery. On October 2, 1944, he was promoted to major. The 9th Infantry Division was awarded a Belgian Unit Citation for meritorious service during the period September 3–13, 1944.

==== Germany ====
While getting a pass to Scotland in December, he returned instead to the 2nd Battalion, 60th Infantry, which was at Camp Elsenborn, Germany. Urban was welcomed by his men, who thought he had been killed in action. Although Urban could not speak, he requested a combat assignment in writing. His request was denied for medical concerns by the 60th Infantry Regiment commander at Elsenborn. He was allowed to stay with the 2nd Battalion until the battalion pulled out of Elsenborn, and he returned to England.

Beginning in October 1945, he was a staff writer and later an editor for Liberty Magazine's Veterans' View Bulletin until October 1947; he was medically retired from the U.S. Army in February 1946. During this time he was promoted to lieutenant colonel and changed his legal name from Matty Urbanowitz to Matt Urban.

== Later years ==
In 1949, he became the Recreation Director in Port Huron, Michigan. Starting in 1956, he took a job as Director of the Monroe, Michigan, Community Center until 1972. After leaving the job, he continued to serve the community center as coach for basketball, baseball, and football programs. At Monroe, he also trained several young men who became national Golden Gloves Champions. He was appointed chair of the Michigan Olympic Boxing Committee. Later, as part of the Chicago Olympic Committee, he was one of three trainers who accompanied Muhammad Ali, at that time still known as Cassius Clay, to the San Francisco Olympic tryouts.

After Monroe, he became the Director of the Recreation Department for Holland, Michigan from 1972 to 1989. He organized a camp for underprivileged children and became its Camp Director, served as Boys Club director, and a Cub Scout Cubmaster. He was also involved in other activities and organizations like the Red Cross, the Amateur Softball Association, and Boy Scouts, as chairman, board member, and committee member. He was inducted into the Hall of Honor at the Softball Hall of Fame.

In 1989, Urban retired and self-published an autobiography, The Matt Urban Story, Life And World War II Experiences. In 1990, the book was retitled as The Hero-We Nearly Forgot, The Matt Urban Story.

=== Medal of Honor ===
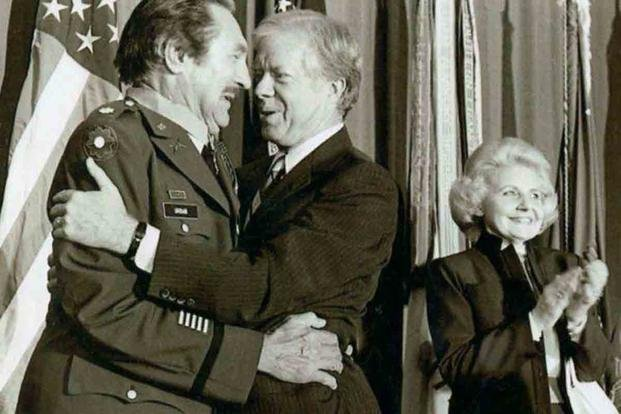
Urban awarded the Medal of Honor by U.S. President Jimmy Carter, July 19, 1980

In early 1979, a Michigan Disabled American Veterans (DAV) regional service representative who had come to know Urban personally over a long period of time, sent an official Medal of Honor recommendation inquiry to U.S. Army Headquarters. The misplaced MOH recommendation for Urban was found and revealed that Major Max L. Wolf, Urban's battalion commander in France, had initiated a Medal of Honor recommendation for Urban which was forwarded by Staff Sergeant Earl Evans just prior to Wolf being killed in action in France on August 6, 1944. The U.S. Army then completed the necessary recommendation process to award Urban the Medal of Honor. In 1980, by the direction of the President, the Department of the Army awarded Matt Urban the Medal of Honor, in the name of the Congress.

On July 10, 1980, Urban was notified by the White House that he was a Medal of Honor recipient, and the next day he was notified that the Medal of Honor award ceremony would be on July 19. On July 18, Urban was presented the Legion of Merit, Bronze Star Medal with "V" device (second oak leaf cluster), and his seventh Purple Heart (sixth oak leaf cluster), by Army Chief of Staff, Edward C. Meyer, during a ceremony at the Pentagon. At a ceremony at the French Embassy, he was also presented the Croix de guerre with Bronze Star by Francois Lefebvre de Labouaye, the French Ambassador to the United States. The citation for the medal which was not personally awarded to Urban before this occasion was signed by General Charles de Gaulle in June 1944. On July 19, President Jimmy Carter presented Urban the Medal of Honor in front of several hundred guests, which included fellow 9th Infantry Division veterans who had served with Urban in combat.

=== Death ===
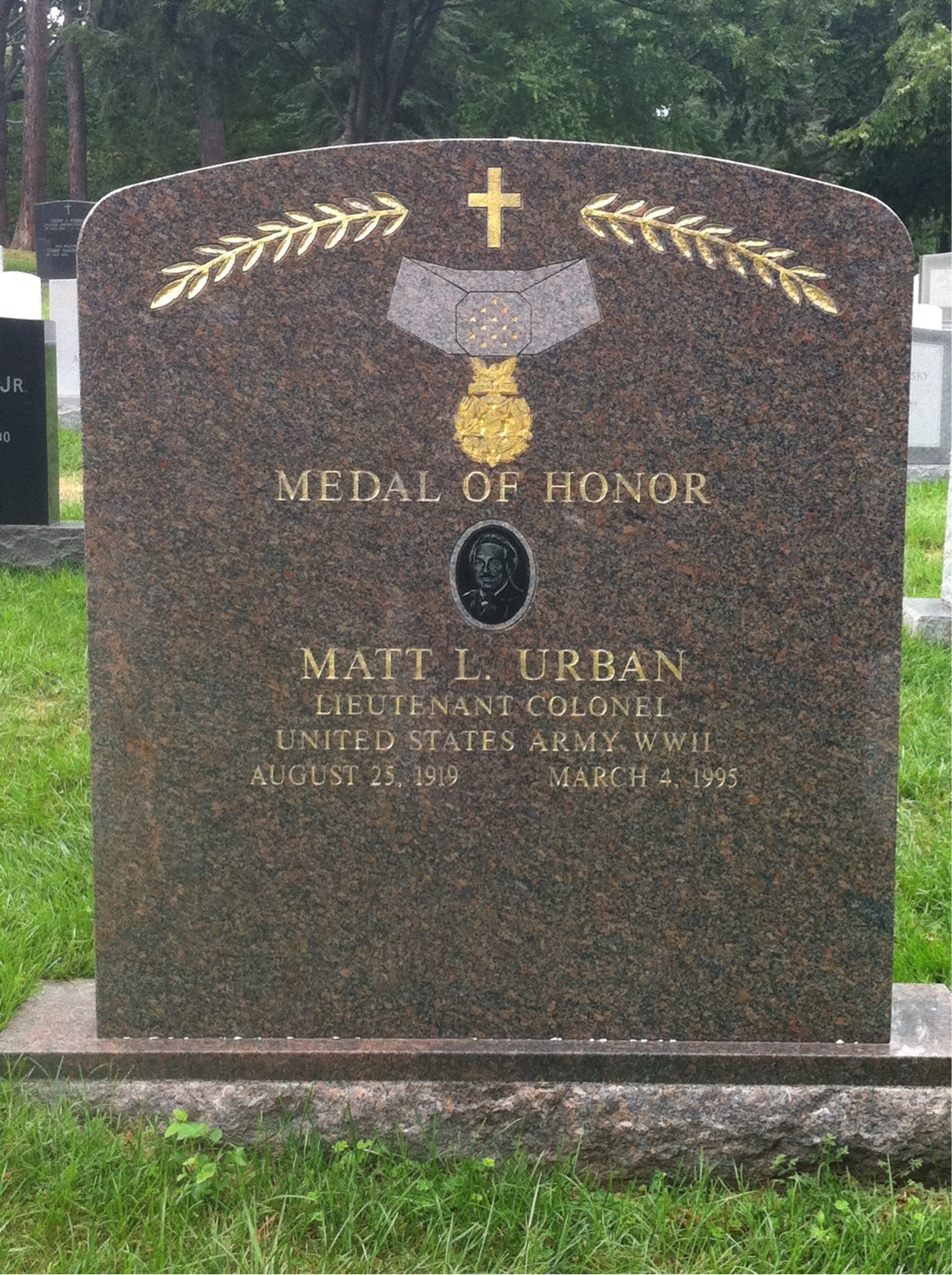
Urban's grave at Arlington National Cemetery

Urban died on March 4, 1995, in Holland, Michigan, at the age of 75. The cause of death was a collapsed lung, reportedly due to his war injuries. He is buried at Arlington National Cemetery in Arlington, Virginia.

== Military awards and honors ==
Urban's military awards include fourteen individual decorations for combat: the Medal of Honor, two Silver Stars, the Legion of Merit, three Bronze Star Medals (two for heroism), and seven Purple Hearts. Urban received the following military decorations and awards:

Combat Infantryman Badge
Medal of Honor		Silver Star with bronze oak leaf cluster
Legion of Merit	Bronze Star Medal with Valor device and two bronze oak leaf clusters	Purple Heart with silver and bronze oak leaf clusters
American Defense Service Medal	American Campaign Medal	European-African-Middle Eastern Campaign Medal with 3/16" silver star and one 3/16" bronze star
World War II Victory Medal	Croix de Guerre with Star (France) (Note: There is a discrepancy between Army records and Urban's autobiography. The Army lists this medal as the Croix de Guerre with Bronze Star, while Urban states it is the Croix de Guerre with Silver-Gilt Star.)	Croix de Guerre with Palm (Unit Citation – Emblem not authorized) (France)

Army Presidential Unit Citation (Note: Urban's autobiography lists two awards of the Presidential Unit Citation (PUC), while the Army officially credits him with one. Prior to September 3, 1944, Urban's final day in combat, the 2nd Battalion, 60th Infantry Regiment received two PUCs awarded for April 23–24 and June 16, 1944. According to his Medal of Honor citation, Urban was wounded in the early morning hours of June 15 and "evacuated to England". He did not return to his unit until July 25. Therefore, if he was not present during the cited action on June 16, he would not be eligible for the second PUC.)

=== Medal of Honor citation ===
Urban's Medal of Honor citation reads:

Rank and organization: Lieutenant Colonel (then captain), 2nd Battalion, 60th Infantry Regiment, 9th Infantry Division
Place and date: Renouf, France, 14 July to 3 September 1944
Entered service at: Fort Bragg, North Carolina, 2 July 1941
Date and place of birth: 25 August 1919, Buffalo, New York

G.O. No.: 10, 18 September 1980

The President of the United States in the name of The Congress takes pleasure in presenting the MEDAL OF HONOR to

LIEUTENANT COLONEL MATT URBAN, RETIRED
UNITED STATES ARMY

CITATION:

For conspicuous gallantry and intrepidity at risk of life above and beyond the call of duty: Lieutenant Colonel (then Captain) Matt Urban, 112-22-2414, United States Army, distinguished himself by a series of bold, heroic actions, exemplified by singularly outstanding combat leadership, personal bravery, and tenacious devotion to duty, during the period 14 June to 3 September 1944 while assigned to the 2nd Battalion, 60th Infantry Regiment, 9th Infantry Division. On 14 June, Captain Urban's company, attacking at Renouf, France, encountered heavy enemy small arms and tank fire. The enemy tanks were unmercifully raking his unit's positions and inflicting heavy casualties. Captain Urban, realizing that his company was in imminent danger of being decimated, armed himself with a bazooka. He worked his way with an ammo carrier through hedgerows, under a continuing barrage of fire, to a point near the tanks. He brazenly exposed himself to the enemy fire and, firing the bazooka, destroyed both tanks. Responding to Captain Urban's action, his company moved forward and routed the enemy. Later that same day, still in the attack near Orglandes, Captain Urban was wounded in the leg by direct fire from a 37mm tank-gun. He refused evacuation and continued to lead his company until they moved into defensive positions for the night. At 0500 hours the next day, Captain Urban, though badly wounded, directed his company in another attack. One hour later he was again wounded. Suffering from two wounds, one serious, he was evacuated to England.

In mid-July, while recovering from his wounds, he learned of his unit's severe losses in the hedgerows of Normandy. Realizing his unit's need for battle-tested leaders, he voluntarily left the hospital and hitchhiked his way back to his unit near St. Lo, France. Arriving at the 2d Battalion Command Post at 1130 hours, 25 July, he found that his unit had jumped-off at 1100 hours in the first attack of "Operation Cobra". Still limping from his leg wound, Captain Urban made his way forward to retake command of his company. He found his company held up by strong enemy opposition. Two supporting tanks had been destroyed and another, intact but with no tank commander or gunner, was not moving. He located a lieutenant in charge of the support tanks and directed a plan of attack to eliminate the enemy strong-point. The lieutenant and a sergeant were immediately killed by the heavy enemy fire when they tried to mount the tank. Captain Urban, though physically hampered by his leg wound and knowing quick action had to be taken, dashed through the scathing fire and mounted the tank. With enemy bullets ricocheting from the tank, Captain Urban ordered the tank forward and, completely exposed to the enemy fire, manned the machine gun and placed devastating fire on the enemy. His action, in the face of enemy fire, galvanized the battalion into action and they attacked and destroyed the enemy position. On 2 August, Captain Urban was wounded in the chest by shell fragments and, disregarding the recommendation of the Battalion Surgeon, again refused evacuation. On 6 August, Captain Urban became the commander of the 2d Battalion. On 15 August, he was again wounded but remained with his unit.

On 3 September, the 2d Battalion was given the mission of establishing a crossing-point on the Meuse River near Heer, Belgium. The enemy planned to stop the advance of the allied Army by concentrating heavy forces at the Meuse. The 2d Battalion, attacking toward the crossing-point, encountered fierce enemy artillery, small arms and mortar fire which stopped the attack. Captain Urban quickly moved from his command post to the lead position of the battalion. Reorganizing the attacking elements, he personally led a charge toward the enemy's strong-point. As the charge moved across the open terrain, Captain Urban was seriously wounded in the neck. Although unable to talk above a whisper from the paralyzing neck wound, and in danger of losing his life, he refused to be evacuated until the enemy was routed and his battalion had secured the crossing-point on the Meuse River. Captain Urban's personal leadership, limitless bravery, and repeated extraordinary exposure to enemy fire served as an inspiration to his entire battalion. His valorous and intrepid actions reflect the utmost credit on him and uphold the noble traditions of the United States Army.

— Jimmy Carter

=== Personal awards and honors ===
Urban's personal awards and honors include:

- Man of the Year Award (1953), Monroe, Michigan
- New York State Conspicuous Service Cross (1979)
- Matt Urban Day (1979), Holland, Michigan
- Amateur Softball Association of America, National Softball Hall of Fame (Commissioner), 1980
- Matt Urban Sports Complex (1996), Holland, Michigan
- Matt Urban Center (2000), Buffalo, New York
- Matt Urban American Legion Post 40, Monroe, Michigan
- Lt. Col. Matt Urban Memorial (2008), Buffalo, New York
- Lt. Col. Matt Urban VFW Post 7275 (2011), Lancaster, New York
- Lt. Col. Matt Urban Polish Legion of American Veterans (PLAV) Post 164, Warren, Ohio
- National Veteran Boxers Association, Buffalo Boxing Hall of Fame (2012)
- Matt Urban Memorial Bridge, US 24, was named after Urban in 2014, in Monroe County, Michigan
- Kappa Delta Rho fraternity, Ordo Honoris – Beta Chapter, Cornell University
- The Headquarters, 2nd Battalion, 60th Infantry, building at Fort Jackson, South Carolina was named "Urban Hall" in March 2017

== See also ==
- List of Medal of Honor recipients for World War II
