= Nancy Douglas Bowditch =

American dramatist

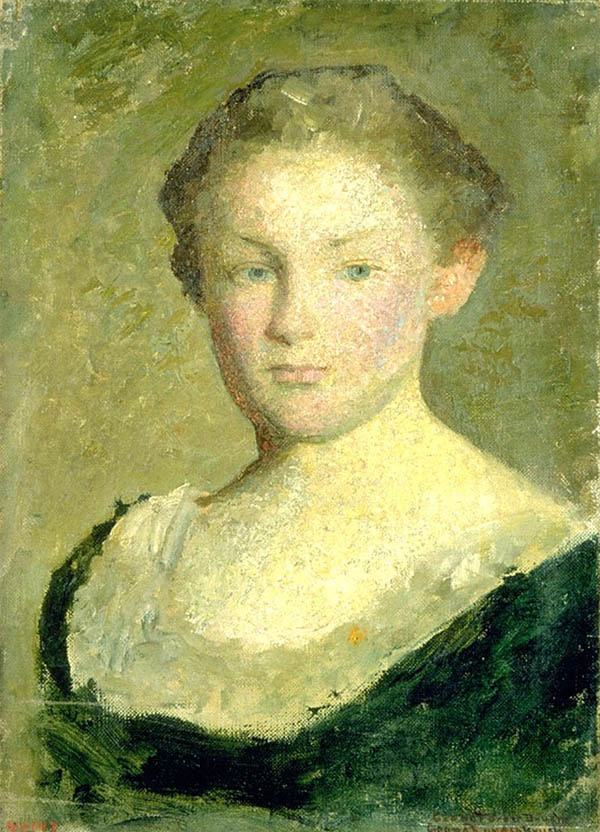
- Nancy, painted by her father in c. 1905
- Born: Nancy Douglas Brush; July 4, 1890; Paris, France
- Died: May 1, 1979 (aged 88); Peterborough, New Hampshire
- Other names: Mrs. Harold Bowditch, Nancy Brush, Nancy Pearmain
- Known for: Speaker, writer, illustrator, costumer
- Spouses: William Robert Pearmain (1909–1912), Harold Bowditch (1916–1964)

Nancy Douglas Bowditch (July 4, 1890 – May 1, 1979) was an American artist, author, costumer and set designer. The daughter of painter George de Forest Brush, she produced a biography of him in 1970, and her own memoirs published posthumously. She was married firstly to the artist William Robert Pearmain, and later to Dr. Harold Bowditch.

She became involved in costume work for plays but sought spiritual concerns and found the Baháʼí Faith in 1926, going on Baháʼí pilgrimage and serving in the arts inside and outside the religion's community She was active in the Baháʼí Faith community of Greater Boston, elected as Chair of the Boston Spiritual Assembly and later to the first local assembly of Peterborough, New Hampshire.

== Early years ==
Nancy Douglas Bowditch, was born Nancy Brush in Paris on July 4, 1890, daughter of painter George de Forest Brush, and Mary "Mittie" Taylor (Whelpley) Brush, a sculptor and inventor.

In Dublin the family were neighbors and close friends with Samuel Clemens and his daughter Jean Clemens, who died about 1909, and then the Clemens moved away. Nancy met William Robert Pearmain in America in 1906 and he followed her in 1907 to Europe. They married in 1909, she betrothed as "Nancy Douglas", and he a student of her father's. They had a daughter born May 1911. The Brush family interacted with ʻAbdu'l-Bahá and the Baháʼís in the area in July and August 1912, especially during an annual out-of-doors play as well he visited their farm. Pearmain died unexpectedly in September. Nancy moved from place to place until she married Harvard graduate Dr. Harold Bowditch in October 1916.

== Spiritual search ==
Bowditch became more involved with costume work for theatre productions. While her life was going well she also felt "something was wanting in my existence and couldn't put a finger on ... I then began to seek for that missing link, going to most every church and attending various meetings. ... (and) hearing of a meeting to be held in Boston about the Baháʼí Faith."

I'll never forget entering the large hall and seeing around me such a different type of gathering from the usual Boston crowd. Here were both rich and poor, along with every race. Many were black. I listened to a wonderful talk on the Faith by Mr. Harry Randall and was so thrilled! Afterwards I made my way straight to the table where books were being sold in order to learn more about the subject. I picked out as many as could be comfortably carried home on the streetcar, then found to my dismay that I didn't have enough money with which to pay for them! The person at the book stand told me it was all right to take them home and pay at the next meeting.

This may have been an event the Boston Baháʼí community hosted called a "World Unity Conference" in 1926 as part of a series sponsored by the National Spiritual Assembly of the Baháʼís of the United States and covered in the Boston Evening Transcript. Randall helped organize and spoke at it. The first day long meeting was held at Steinert Hall, the second at the Second Unitarian Church, and third at the Church of the Redemption where Randall chaired the day. She then credits Randall, Louise Drake Wright and her sister Mrs. George Nelson as aiding her inquiry into the religion while she read books like Baháʼu'lláh and the New Era. She officially joined the religion in 1929. She was visible in the 1930 Race Amity Convention held at Green Acre, by then an established conference center of the religion, and left on Baháʼí pilgrimage in late March 1931 with her then 19 yr old daughter. They spent three weeks in the area of Haifa and left by way of Jerusalem taking in Christian paths of pilgrimage. She then attended the 1931 national convention of the Baháʼís in the United States reporting on events in Boston as the Chair of the Boston Assembly. She wrote of her pilgrimage in Star of the West in July 1931. and spoke of it in August.

== Arts and services ==
Bowditch would continue working with the religion with occasional gaps in public mention. Bowditch repeated her activity at the Green Acre Race Amity conference in 1934 including an event at her home. In 1936 she assisted in World Order magazine publications with some cover art. In 1937 she offered a talk for the summer program at Green Acre that also dedicated a new hall. In 1938 she took up residence in a summer studio at Green Acre and ran a program on art for the school. In 1939 she was on a national radio committee for the religion. There is a break in visible activity in 1940 and her father died April 24, 1941, but she was again involved at Green Acre in July 1941 for a pageant. After another year gap in activity she was on the centenary committee of 1943-44, to commemorate the founding of the religion in 1844. In Portsmouth she offered a program at the Baháʼí library about her pilgrimage, as well as at Green Acre. She was on the maintenance committee for Green Acre across 1945–1947. In Teaneck, New Jersey she offered a program for youth on dramatizations of the religion, and her poem "The Song of Tahirih" was published in July 1947 World Order . In 1948 she was listed as the corresponding secretary of the Baháʼí group of Brookline, Massachusetts, and offered a program in nearby Hamilton, Massachusetts. Her mother died in 1949. In 1950 she published a play The Desert Tent: An Easter Play in Three Episodes.

In 1953 Bowditch was noted helping a Portsmouth community pageant, and her family moved to Peterborough, New Hampshire in the south of the state in 1959, attended the 1963 Baháʼí World Congress with her husband and a granddaughter, and in 1965 Bowditch is pictured on the first local Spiritual Assembly of Brookline, the local administrative organization of the religion.

== Retirement years ==
Harold died in August 1964 and their home at 12 Pine Street became the official Baháʼí Center of the community in 1967 at which Guy Murchie gave a talk for the opening ceremony. In 1968 Bowditch donated a number of materials to the Library of Harvard Medical School from her husband's collection. She also began to donate materials to the Archives of American Art in several installments between 1968 and 1979.

In 1970 she was at the official presentation of a Baháʼí book to then Governor Walter R. Peterson, Jr. and published a book on her father. In 1971 she gave a talk about meeting ʻAbdu'l-Baha.

In 1972 she was noted by Portsmouth Friends of the Library, spoke at Meriden, Connecticut on her memory of meeting ʻAbdu'l-Bahá, and aided in costumes for play at Keene State College.

She died May 1, 1979 and a posthumously published memoir, The Artist's Daughter: Memoirs 1890-1979 was printed with the aide of her grandchildren.

== See also ==
- Baháʼí Faith in Greater Boston
