= The American Review: A Whig Journal =

US magazine

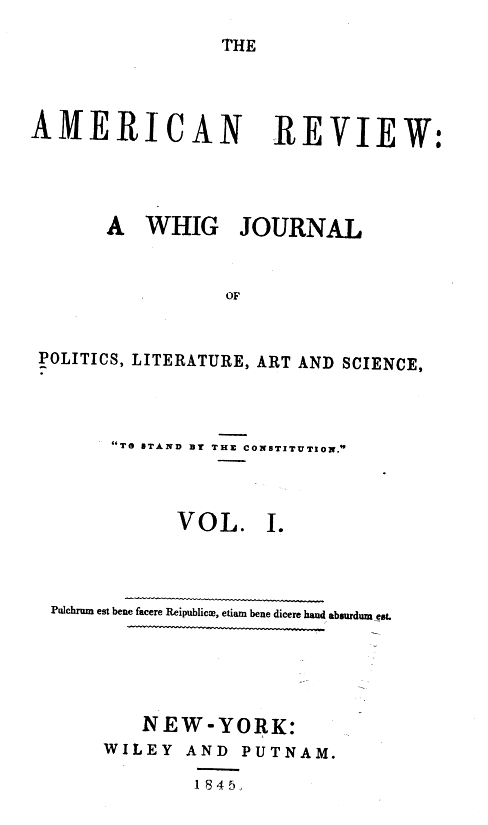
- Title page of an 1845 issue of the American Review
- Editor: James Davenport Whelpley (1847–1852); George H. Colton (1844–1847)
- Categories: General interest
- Frequency: Monthly
- First issue: 1844; 181 years ago
- Final issue: 1852
- Company: Wiley & Putnam
- Country: United States
- Language: English

The American Review, alternatively known as The American Review: A Whig Journal and The American Whig Review, was a New York City-based monthly periodical that published from 1844 to 1852. Published by Wiley and Putnam, it was edited by George H. Colton, and after his death, beginning with Volume 7, by James Davenport Whelpley. As of Volume 10, July 1849, the proprietors of the journal were Whelpley and John Priestly. The American Review was allied to the Whig Party.

== History ==
The first issue of American Review was dated January 1845, though it was likely published as early as October 1844, and intended to promote the Whig candidate Henry Clay, running in the presidential election of 1844. Clay was opposed by James K. Polk, the Democratic Party’s candidate, who had the support of the Democratic Review.

In December 1844, Edgar Allan Poe was recommended as an editorial assistant by James Russell Lowell, though Poe was not hired. In May 1846, Poe reviewed Colton's work in The Literati of New York City, published in Godey's Lady's Book. Poe described Colton's poem "Tecumseh" as "insufferably tedious" but said that the magazine was one of the best of its kind in the United States.

The American Review had the distinction of being the first authorized periodical to print "The Raven" in February 1845. It was printed with the pseudonym "Quarles". Another well-known poem by Poe, "Ulalume", also was first published (anonymously) in the American Review. Other works by Poe published in the American Review include "Some Words with a Mummy" and "The Facts in the Case of M. Valdemar".

The American Review ceased publication in 1852, unable to continue paying its contributors.

== See also ==
Other American journals that Edgar Allan Poe was involved with include:

- Broadway Journal
- Burton's Gentleman's Magazine
- Godey's Lady's Book
- Graham's Magazine
- Southern Literary Messenger
- The Stylus
