= Peter le Page Renouf =

British professor (1822-1897)

Sir Peter le Page Renouf (23 August 1822 – 14 October 1897) was a British professor, Egyptologist, and museum director, best known for his translation of The Book of the Dead.

== Personal life ==
Renouf was born in Guernsey on the Channel Islands on 23 August 1822. He married Ludovica von Brentano, member of a well-known German literary family in 1857. He died in London on 14 October 1897. His daughter Edith Renouf founded Guernsey's first residential care home, Le Platon.

Lady Renouf burned to death 8 February 1921, at the age of 85, when an oil lamp set her bed on fire, at her home in Roland Gardens, South Kensington.

== Education ==
Renouf was educated at Elizabeth College, Guernsey. He matriculated at Pembroke College, Oxford in 1840. He became a Roman Catholic, under the influence of John Henry Newman, and left without taking a degree since he was unable to subscribe to the Thirty Nine Articles, as required in those days.

== Religious background ==
Like many other Anglican converts, he proved a thorn in the side of the Ultramontane party in the Roman Church, though he did not, like some of them, return to the communion of the Church of England. He opposed the promulgation of the dogma of Papal Infallibility, and his treatise (1868) upon the condemnation of Pope Honorius for heresy by the council of Constantinople in AD 680 was placed upon the index of prohibited books.

== Career ==
=== Professorship ===
He had been from 1855 to 1864 professor of ancient history and Oriental languages in the Roman Catholic university which Newman vainly strove to establish in Dublin, and during part of this period edited the Atlantis and the Home and Foreign Review, which latter had to be discontinued on account of the hostility of the Roman Catholic hierarchy.

Renouf was one of the defenders of Champollion and of his method of decipherment of Egyptian hieroglyphics in England when he was being criticized unfairly by other scholars.

=== Museum directorship ===
In 1864 he was appointed a government inspector of schools, which position he held until 1886, when his growing celebrity as an Egyptologist procured him the appointment of Keeper of Oriental Antiquities in the British Museum, in succession to Dr Samuel Birch. His understudy was E. A. Wallis Budge with whom he had an acrimonious relationship. He didn't want Budge to succeed him as keeper, through a perceived lack of social skills (Budge didn't come from a privileged background) and doubts about his abilities, objecting strongly to Budge being appointed as his successor and preferring Edouard Naville instead. Renouf was elected in 1887 president of the Society of Biblical Archaeology, to whose Proceedings he was a constant contributor.

Renouf was removed from his position as Keeper in the British Museum on reaching retirement age despite the signed opposition of twenty-five leading European Egyptologists of the day who wrote to the prime minister. Renouf gave "excoriating evidence in court against Budge" when the latter was found to have "falsely accused Hormuzd Rassam of being corruptly involved in illicit trade of cuneiform tablets." Renouf continued to feel animosity towards Budge, accusing him of plagiarism and being a charlatan.

== Academic works ==
The most important of his contributions to Egyptology are his Hibbert Lectures on The Religion of the Egyptians, delivered in 1879; and the translation of The Book of the Dead, with an ample commentary, published in the Transactions of the society over which he presided. He retired from the Museum under the superannuation rule in 1891 and was knighted for services to the British Museum in 1896.

His letters show unstinting praise for Renouf's scholarship from all the leading Egyptologists of his day.

== Bibliography ==
- "Lectures on the Origin and Growth of Religion as Illustrated by the Religion of Ancient Egypt", Delivered in May and June 1879, republished Adamant 2001, ISBN 1-4021-7377-6
