= George de Forest Brush =

American painter (1855–1941)

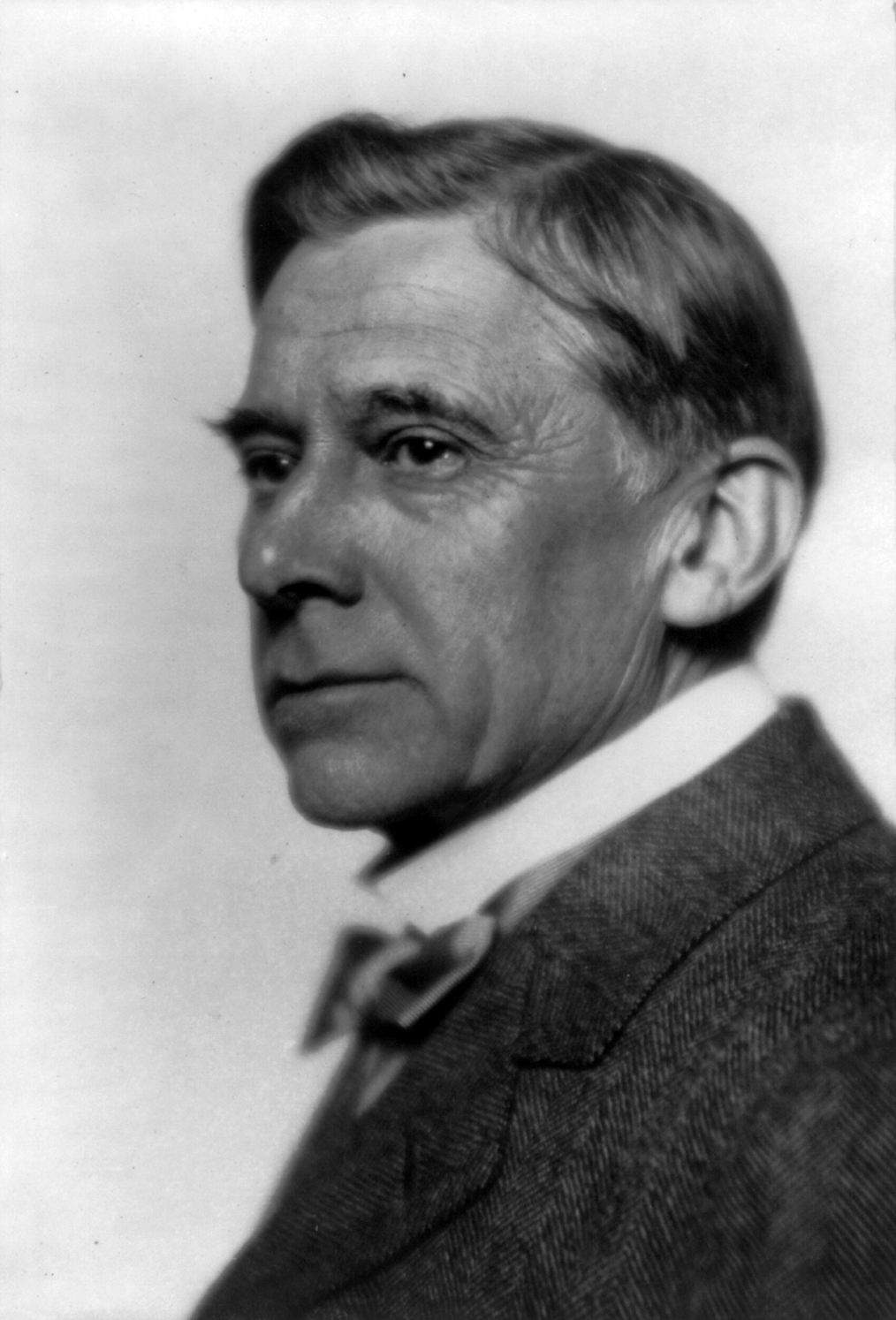
- George de Forest Brush
- Born: September 28, 1855; Shelbyville, Tennessee
- Died: April 24, 1941 (aged 85); Hanover, New Hampshire
- Occupation: Artist
- Spouse: Mary Taylor Whelpley (m. 1886)
- Parents: Alfred Clark Brush (father); Nancy Douglas (mother)
- Relatives: Nancy Brush (daughter)

George de Forest Brush (September 28, 1855 – April 24, 1941) was an American painter and Georgist. In collaboration with his friend, the artist Abbott H. Thayer, he made contributions to military camouflage, as did his wife, aviator and artist Mary (called Mittie) Taylor (Whelpley) Brush, and their son, the sculptor Gerome Brush.

== Background ==
Although Brush was born in Shelbyville, Tennessee, his parents, Nancy (Douglas) and Alfred Clark Brush, were New Englanders, and he grew up in Danbury, Connecticut. He attended the National Academy of Design in New York, and also studied in Paris under Jean-Léon Gérôme at the Ecole des Beaux Arts, where Thayer was also a student.

Brush was a supporter of women's suffrage, serving as the Honorary Vice-president of the Cornish Equal Suffrage League in New Hampshire.

== Native American interests ==
He returned from Paris in 1880, and soon after accompanied his brother on a business excursion to Wyoming. He remained in that part of the country for some months, and lived among various Native Americans, including Arapahoes, Crows and Shoshones. When he returned East, he developed a series of paintings derived from his drawings of Indian life. In the early 1880s, some of these were published in prominent periodicals, such as Harper's Weekly and Century Magazine, sometimes as illustrations for his own eyewitness accounts. Even years later, he still enjoyed living occasionally in a tepee. It was partly because of such "wildness" that his future in-laws refused to approve of his marriage to their daughter, née Mittie Taylor Whelpley, which took place by elopement in 1886.

== Artistic career ==
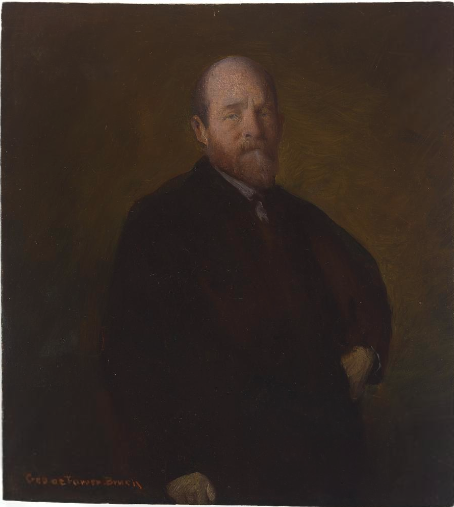
Artist: George de Forest Brush, Sitter: Henry George, Date: 1888

Around the same time period, the subjects of Brush's paintings evolved from heroic depictions of Indian life to Renaissance-inspired portraits, some of which were modeled by his wife and his children. Among his many awards were gold medals at the Columbian Exposition (Chicago, 1893), Exposition Internationale (Paris, 1900), Pan-American Exposition (Buffalo, 1901), and Louisiana Purchase Exposition (St. Louis, 1904). He was elected to the Society of American Artists, the National Academy of Design (1908), and the American Academy of Arts and Letters (1910).

He encouraged and tutored the young Black American landscapist Richard Lonsdale Brown after the youth went to Brush's studio to show him his portfolio in the Spring of 1911. A moving account of their meeting was published in 1912 in The Crisis and the New York Times.

== Camouflage ==
Brush and his family often spent the summer in Dublin, New Hampshire, where there was a thriving artists colony, and where they eventually settled. Among the other residents was Thayer, who was intensely interested in protective coloration in nature or what later became known as camouflage. According to Brush's daughter, as early as 1898 Brush and Thayer worked together on devising ways to use natural camouflage principles for military purposes. For example, they suggested that countershading (a natural protective device that Thayer had discovered in 1896) could be used as a way of reducing the visibility of a ship. This was later patented (by Thayer and Gerome Brush) as U.S. Patent No. 715013, "Process of Treating the Outside of Ships, etc., For Making Them Less Visible".

In 1916, Brush acquired a small Morane-Borel monoplane (also known as a Morane-Saulnier). He experimented with the possibility of making its wings and fuselage transparent, to reduce its visibility. His wife, who was an early woman aviator, also addressed the problem of airplane camouflage, as shown by her various patents.

== Later life ==
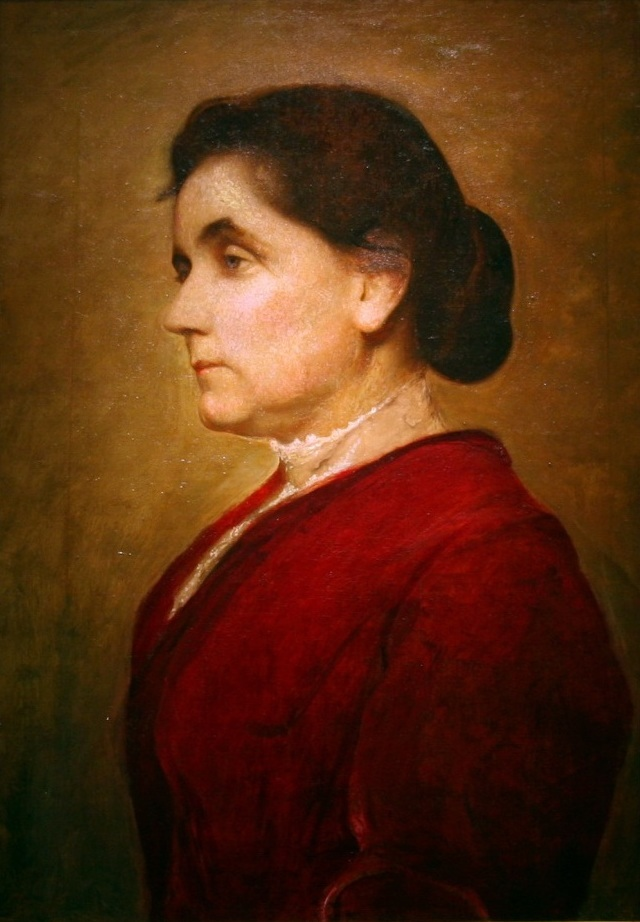
Jane Addams, 1906, by George de Forest Brush

Brush died in Hanover, New Hampshire, in 1941. Nearly thirty years later, his eldest daughter, a painter and theatre designer named Nancy Douglas Bowditch, published an account of his life.

Brush is also well known as the "grandfather" of American art pottery. Having been inspired by the American Pueblo artisans, and learning their craft, he brought these techniques to Philadelphia, Pennsylvania, and more importantly Long Island and Manhattan, New York, where he started The Brush Guild Pottery Foundation. His students were mostly females, who would later go on to create decorative household works, jars with lids, urns and such. Many depicted animal stylings (bulls, cows, lions).

He was also a personal friend of Author Mark Twain, whom he visited many times. He was a world traveler.

His oil paintings (specifically of Indians, from the period 1888–1900) were important influences on the young illustrator N. C. Wyeth. Observe the similarities in shapes and symbols in his painting Mourning her Brave and Wyeth's Winter (of 1909). He led a fascinating life and was an important force in the arts at the turn of the 20th century.

== Selected works ==
- The Sculptor and the King (1888), Portland Museum of Art, Portland, Oregon. Awarded the 1888 First Hallgarten Prize by the National Academy of Design.
- The Moose Chase (1888), Smithsonian American Art Museum, Washington, D.C.
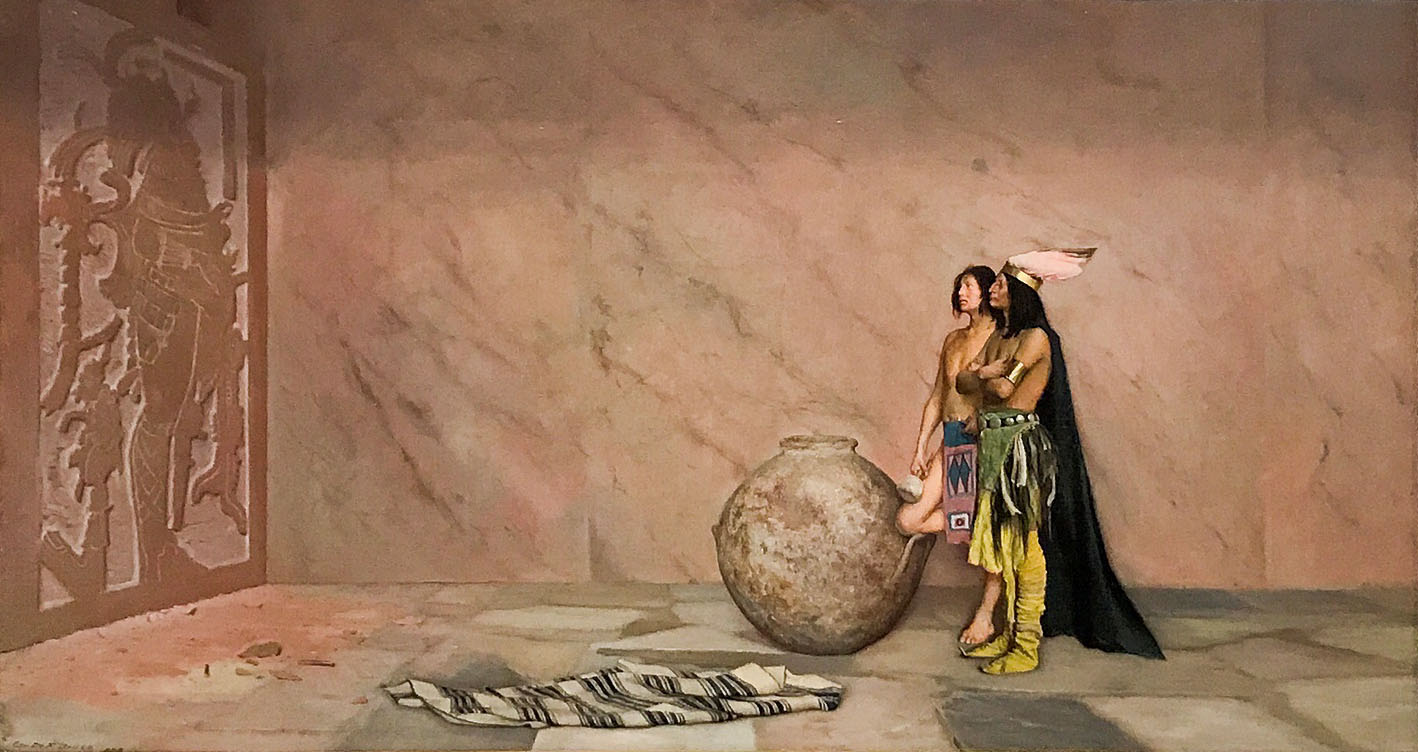
The Sculptor and the King (1888)

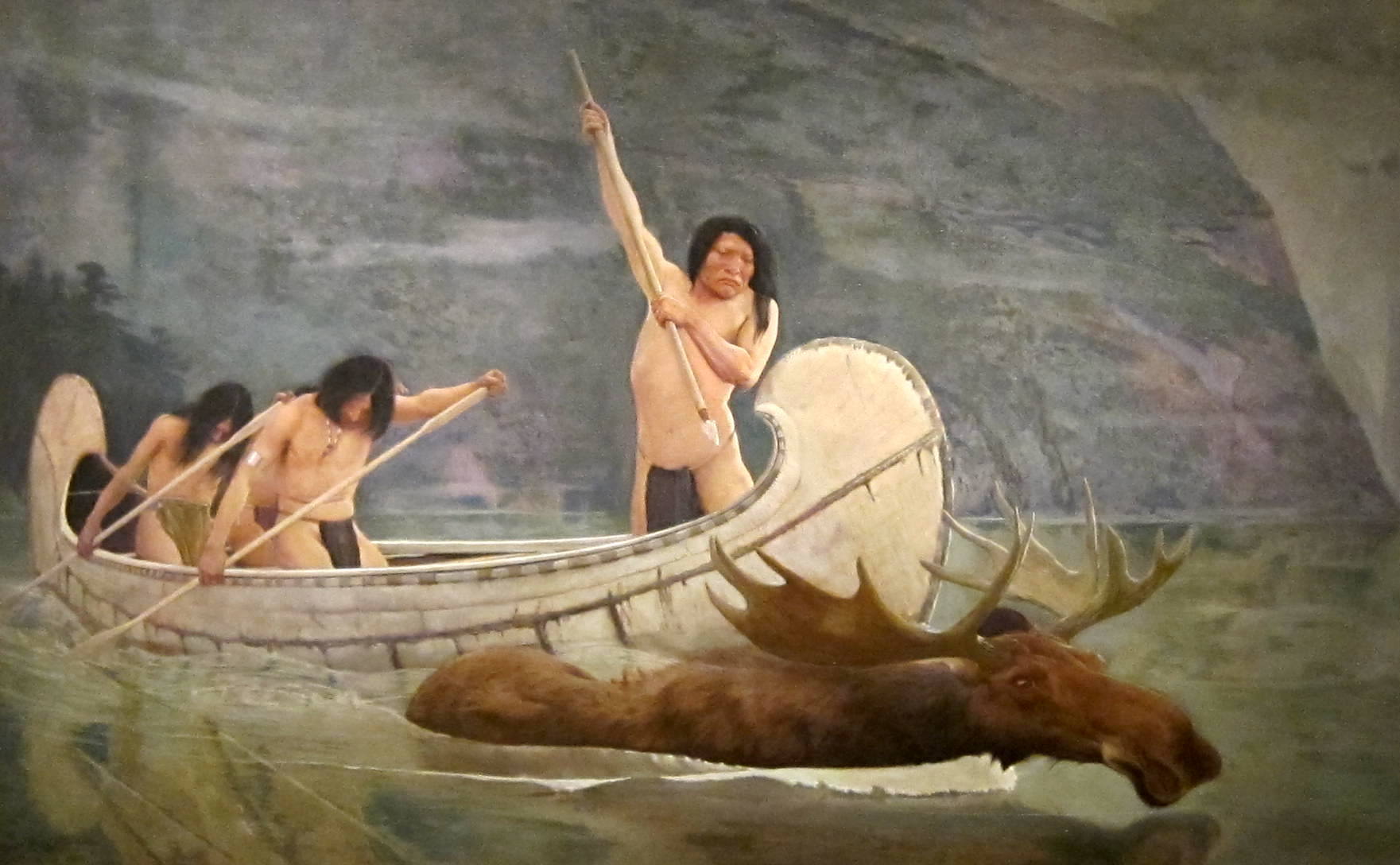
The Moose Chase (1888)
