= Edith Renouf =

Philanthropist from Guernsey (1864–1956)

Edith Renouf MBE

Personal details
- Born: Magdalen Mary Edith Louisa Renouf; 1864 London, England
- Died: 1956 (aged 91–92)
- Occupation: Philanthropist

Magdalen Mary Edith Louisa Renouf (1864–1956) was a philanthropist from Guernsey, Channel Islands.

Renouf was born in London in 1864. Her father, Egyptologist Peter le Page Renouf, was born in Guernsey and educated there at Elizabeth College. Holidaying in France she saw wounded soldiers returning from the Franco-Prussian War (1870–1871), and this influenced her to study medicine and pharmacy.

She established Le Platon in Saint Peter Port, the longest-established care home on the island of Guernsey, in 1914, having inherited the building. In 1927 she donated all her personal wealth to the home.

She supported the first group of Sisters Hospitaller of the Sacred Heart of Jesus in the British Isles, when they came to Guernsey in 1920. The sisters lived and worked in Le Platon until 2015, when the remaining elderly sisters were relocated to the mother house of the order in England.

She was appointed MBE in the 1952 New Year Honours. She was described as "Foundress and Honorary Warden of Le Platon Home for Incurables, Guernsey".

== Selected publications ==
- Renouf, Edith (1894). "Women's Work in the African Missions". Publications of the Catholic Truth Society. Catholic Truth Society: 1–20.
