= Vincent Adams Renouf =

American educator and historian (1876–1910)

- Vincent Adams Renouf in his class photo at Johns Hopkins University (1898)
- Born: December 15, 1876; Düsseldorf, Germany
- Died: May 4, 1910 (aged 33); Tianjin, China
- Education: Johns Hopkins University (1894–98; BA 1898); Harvard University (1898–99)
- Occupations: Teacher and author
- Children: Edward von Pechmann Renouf (son)
- Relatives: Edward Renouf (father); Annie Renouf-Whelpley (mother)
- Writing career
- Language: English
- Genre: History
- Notable work: Outlines of General History for Eastern Students (first published in 1908)

Vincent Adams Renouf (December 15, 1876 – May 4, 1910) was an American professor of chemistry, history, and political economy in China from 1903 until his death in 1910, but is best known for having written the textbook Outlines of General History for Eastern Students, first published in 1908.

== Family background ==
Vincent Adams Renouf was born at Düsseldorf, Germany on December 15, 1876, the son of Edward Renouf (1846–1934), a professor of chemistry, and his wife, Annie Vincent Whelpley (1849–1930), an artist and composer. Both parents had Boston connections: Edward Renouf was the son of a Boston-born, Harvard-educated, Episcopalian priest; Annie Whelpley was a great-great-granddaughter of Gov. Samuel Adams (1722–1803).

Edward Renouf received a PhD from the University of Freiberg in 1880. He taught chemistry at the Ludwig-Maximilians-Universität München until 1885, when he returned to the United States to join the faculty of Johns Hopkins University.

Edward and Annie Renouf had two children: Edward Davenport Renouf (1872–1954), born in Boston, and Vincent Adams Renouf (1876–1910), the subject of this article.

When Edward Renouf returned to the United States to teach at Johns Hopkins, he and Annie Renouf effectively separated. In her passport application in 1915, she submitted an affidavit explaining her protracted stay abroad: "... I ceased to reside in the United States about 1881... I have since resided temporarily at Germany, Austria, Italy and Switzerland ... I arrived at Locarno, Switzerland where I am now temporarily residing in December 1915; I came to Europe to engage in my work as a painter and composer and am now obliged to remain here on account of my health .... I maintain the following ties of family in the United States: husband, professor Edward Renouf, Monkton, Maryland and brother: James Davenport Whelpley, c/o Century Magazine, New York ... my husband owns real estate and I receive $1,500 annually from him."

Annie Renouf died at Florence, Italy on May 4, 1930.

Edward Renouf died on November 1, 1934.

== Biography ==
Vincent Renouf spent the first eighteen years of his life in Germany, where he received his primary and secondary education. From 1894 until 1898, he attended Johns Hopkins University (where his father was on the faculty) graduating on June 9, 1898, with a Bachelor of Arts degree in chemistry. During the academic year 1898–1899, he studied history at Harvard University. (In February 1899, he returned to Johns Hopkins to deliver a lecture on Edward Stanwood's "A History of the Presidency," and in March, he gave a second lecture on Archibald Ross Colquhoun's "The Key of the Pacific: The Nicaragua Canal.") In September 1899, having left Harvard before earning a second degree, he accepted a position at the Boston Latin School, teaching German and history.

In September 1901, Renouf traveled to Shanghai, China, to serve as Fourth Assistant B in the Chinese Imperial Maritime Customs Service, a tariff and tax collection agency founded in 1854 following the signing of the Treaty of Nanking by the Chinese and British governments. In addition to tax collection, its responsibilities included postal administration, weather reporting, and policing the China coast and the Yangtze River. It also represented China at over twenty world fairs and exhibitions, ran some educational establishments, and conducted diplomatic activities. While controlled by the Chinese government, the service was largely staffed at senior levels by foreigners. Britons dominated the staff, but there were also large numbers of Germans, Americans, and French.

In April 1903, Renouf accepted a professorship at the newly formed (1895) Pei Yang University in Tianjin. Renouf's employment was part of greater social movement in China, as described by one scholar, writing in 1977:

Following the debacle of the Boxer Rebellion in 1900, the Ch'ing Dynasty's last decade witnessed a greatly increased penetration of Western thought and methods into China. The Manchu regime's allegiance to the traditional patterns to which it had clung for so long was finally broken in the face of overwhelming Western technological superiority. Instead, a policy of selective absorption and adaptation of things Western was adopted. The primary aim of university education in this period was technological Westernization and the upgrading of future bureaucrats to enlighten the masses and guide China's future. Concomitantly, Western knowledge was to be used as a means of preserving Chinese moral values. With such an object in mind, various schools and programs introducing Western subjects were started in China.

At Pei Yang University, Renouf taught chemistry, history, and political economy, and beginning in 1907, wrote the book Outlines of General History for Eastern Students published in London by Macmillan and Co. in 1908. (Macmillan published a separate edition in New York in 1909 entitled, Outlines of General History.)

Renouf died in China from typhoid fever on May 4, 1910.

== Reception: Outlines of General History ==
Renouf's textbook was mostly well received. In 1910, the editors of Education wrote:

With remarkable thoroughness this book of four hundred and eighty-five pages covers the history of the entire world in outline. Of course there has to be a selection from the vast number of facts and a choice as to emphasis. But in simple language and in a manner to meet the demand for an elementary presentation of this great subject the author has covered the ground with a book that has much to recommend it for school and general use.

However, The American Historical Review found that Renouf had devoted insufficient space to the history of the United States:

A single volume presenting the leading facts in the history of the world seems to be justified in this instance. The author intended it for use primarily in the schools of the Far East, especially in those of the Chinese Empire...If the general purpose is kept in mind, we excuse the author, evidently an American teacher in Pei Yang University, when he devotes only three and four lines to the settlements at Jamestown and Plymouth respectively; a scant page to the formation, adoption, and analysis of the Constitution of the United States; and only five and one-half pages to the discussion of our national history.

In 1923, the British edition of Renouf's book was still in print, as noted by the editors of the North-China Herald:

Including the new and revised edition of this excellent book, there have been twelve editions issued since the first in 1907 [sic]. This alone shows the worth of the book. The late Professor Renouf was for several years professor of History and Political Economy at the Pei Yang University, Tientsin, and wrote the ‘"Outlines of General History’’ especially for the use of the Chinese students. The book was quickly adopted by schools and colleges throughout the Far East, and since the death of Mr. Renouf the demand for the book has not declined, but the publishers secured the services of Professor Hearnshaw, of King's College, London, who has thoroughly revised the book, added a supplementary chapter dealing with the course of events during 1907–1922, and supplied two short lists of books. A valuable index and pronouncing vocabulary are to be found at the end of the volume.

Macmillan published the New York edition until 1929, and the London edition until 1938. The Japanese invasion of China in 1937, the depredations of the Second World War and the many social transformations following its conclusion, have made the book obsolete, an artifact of social history.

== Bibliography ==
=== Publications by Vincent Renouf ===
- V.A. Renouf, (William Starr Myers, editor), Outlines of General History for Eastern Students (London: The Macmillan Co., 1908, subsequent editions to 1938).
- V.A. Renouf, (William Starr Myers, editor), Outlines of General History (New York: The Macmillan Co., 1909, subsequent editions to 1929).

=== Publications about Vincent Renouf ===
- Susan Morrison Yen. "The Renouf Papers: An American Academic in China, 1903–1910," in The Journal of the Rutgers University Libraries, Vol. 39, No. 2 (1977).

== See also ==
- Edward Renouf, chemist, Vincent Renouf's father.
- Annie Renouf-Whelpley, artist and composer, Vincent Renouf's mother.
- James Davenport Whelpley, physician and author, Vincent's Renouf's grandfather.
- Edward Renouf, artist, Vincent Renouf's son.
