= Some Words with a Mummy =

1845 short story by Edgar Allan Poe

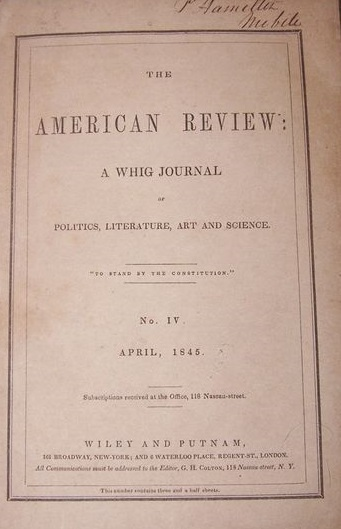
Published in The American Review, April 1845, Vol. I, No. IV.

"Some Words with a Mummy" is a satirical short story by American writer Edgar Allan Poe. It was first published in The American Review: A Whig Journal of Politics, Literature, Art and Science in April 1845. It is an important early portrayal of a revived Egyptian mummy.

== Plot ==
The narrator eats a very large amount of Welsh rabbit, accompanied by "brown stout", and then goes to bed for a night's sleep. However, he is soon awakened and taken to Doctor Ponnonner's home to witness the unwrapping of a mummy.

They cut into the first sarcophagus, remove it and discover the mummy's name, Allamistakeo. The second and third sarcophagi are removed to reveal the body, placed in a papyrus sheath, covered in plaster and decorated with painting and gold gilt. After removing this, they examine the body. They find it to be in exceptionally good condition, although it does not seem to have been embalmed in the normal way as the skin is red and there are no incisions.

The doctor lays out instruments for the dissection, but the men suggest using electricity on the mummy and they begin preparations for this at once. The amount of electricity causes the mummy to awaken and condemn the men for their abuse. The men make their apologies to Allamistakeo, explain to him why they dissect mummies and the scientific importance of it. Satisfied with the explanation and their apologies Allamistakeo shakes hands with the men, who then proceed to patch up the damage caused by their incisions. They gather up proper clothes for Allamistakeo and sit down for cigars and wine.

Allamistakeo explains how he came to be a mummy – ancient Egyptians had a significantly longer life span than modern men, about one thousand years. They were also able to be embalmed – this process arrested the bodily functions allowing them to sleep through hundreds of years only to rise and go on with their lives centuries later. Allamistakeo again chastises the men for their ignorance of Egyptian history. He then explains that throughout time man has always been monotheistic – the pagan gods were symbols of the various aspects of the one true god. The men ask him, as he is over five thousand years old, if he knows anything about how the universe was created ten thousand years ago. Allamistakeo responds that no one during his time entertained the fantasy that the universe was ever created, but that it always existed, although, some believed that humans were created by spontaneous generation in a polygenic manner in different places.

The modern men get into an argument with Allamistakeo about whose civilization is superior, theirs or the ancient Egyptians'. He convincingly upholds the vast superiority of his own culture in all aspects, ending with gesturing at the clothes they have dressed him in and grinning when they mention costume. Finally, one of the men asks if the mummy was familiar with "the manufacture of either Ponnonner's lozenges or Brandreth's pills". To this Allamistakeo has to accept defeat and, in triumph, the men disperse. The narrator, having gone home and gone back to bed (or dreamt that he has done so), awakes the following morning, decides that he is unhappy with his own time and circumstances, and resolves to go to Ponnoner's to get embalmed for a couple hundred years.

== Publication history ==
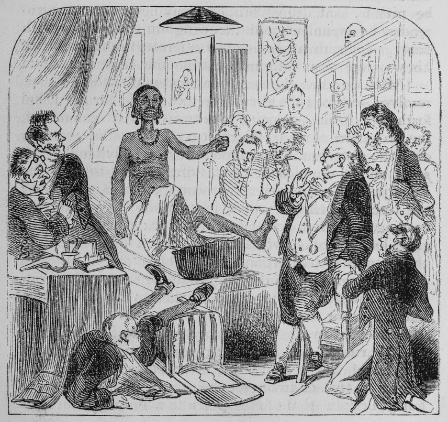
First known image of a revived Egyptian mummy in an 1852 UK publication of "Some Words with a Mummy".

In January 1845, Columbian Magazine listed "Some Words with a Mummy" as scheduled for publication; Poe likely pulled the article when he was offered more money for it elsewhere. It was ultimately published in the April 1845 edition of The American Review, which also included Poe's revised poems "The Valley of Unrest" and "The City in the Sea". The story was republished without changes shortly after in the November 1, 1845, issue of the Broadway Journal.

The story is significant for featuring the earliest known image of a revived Egyptian mummy. In an 1852 anthology of Poe's works published in the UK, an illustration depicted a revived mummy. Poe and the illustrator challenged accepted racial stereotypes and European imperialism.

== Analysis ==
The story is a satire of two contemporary themes. First, the popular interest in Egyptology and mummies during the time that this story was written in the early 1840s. Second, the prevailing thought that in the West humanity had reached the height of civilization and knowledge due to the scientific and industrial revolutions, the belief in Progress.

== Adaptations ==
The story was adapted as a one-act opera, Allamistakeo, by Giulio Viozzi in 1954.

In 2004, the story was featured in Graphic Classics #10: Horror Classics published by Eureka in an adaptation by Rod Lott with illustrations by Kevin Atkinson.

In 2019, a theater organ-based Electro Swing comic opera based on the story was debuted with music by Richard deCosta. The book and the lyrics were written by Thomas Cleveland Lane.
