= Townsend Farm =

Historic house in New Hampshire, United States

- U.S. National Register of Historic Places
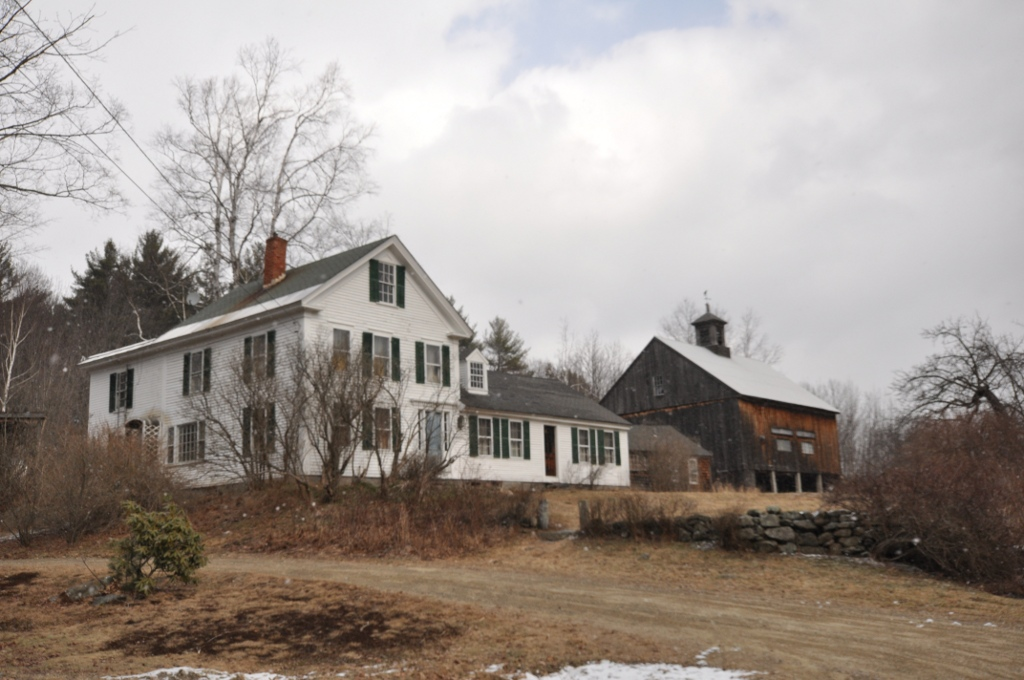

- Location within New Hampshire Location within the United States
- Location: E. Harrisville Rd., Dublin, New Hampshire
- Coordinates: 42°55′4″N 72°2′20″W
- Area: 2.4 acres (0.97 ha)
- Built: 1780
- Architect: Abel Wilder
- Architectural style: Greek Revival, Cape Colonial
- MPS: Dublin MRA
- NRHP reference No.: 83004084
- Added to NRHP: December 15, 1983

The Townsend Farm is a historic farmstead on East Harrisville Road in Dublin, New Hampshire. Built about 1780 and enlarged about 1850 and again at the turn of the 20th century, it is one of Dublin's older houses, notable as the home and studio of artist George DeForest Brush, one of the leading figures of Dublin's early 20th-century art colony. The house was listed on the National Register of Historic Places in 1983.

== Description and history ==
The Townsend Farm is located in a rural setting in eastern Dublin, on the east side of East Harrisville Road a short way north of its junction with Cobb Meadow Road. The house is a rambling multi-section wood-frame structure, oriented roughly perpendicular to the road. Nearest the road is a 2 1/2-story gable-roofed section with Greek Revival features. It has the main building entrance in the rightmost bay of the south facade, flanked by sidelight windows and topped by a corniced lintel. To the right of this section is a 5-bay 1 1/2-story Cape with a secondary entrance at its center. Further ells extend east and north from that section.

The property was developed in several stages, beginning with the construction of the second section c. 1780 by Abel Wilder. The main block of the farmhouse was built c. 1850 by Jonathan Townsend. The property was acquired c. 1890 by the artist George DeForest Brush, who adapted it for use as his principal residence. Brush's studio, a large shed structure located near the property's barn, was destroyed by fire in 1930. Brush was a leading figure in Dublin's art colony, playing host to other artists and luminaries of the art world, including Isabella Stewart Gardner.

== See also ==
- National Register of Historic Places listings in Cheshire County, New Hampshire
