= Mary Taylor Brush =

American painter, sculptor, and pioneer of aviation

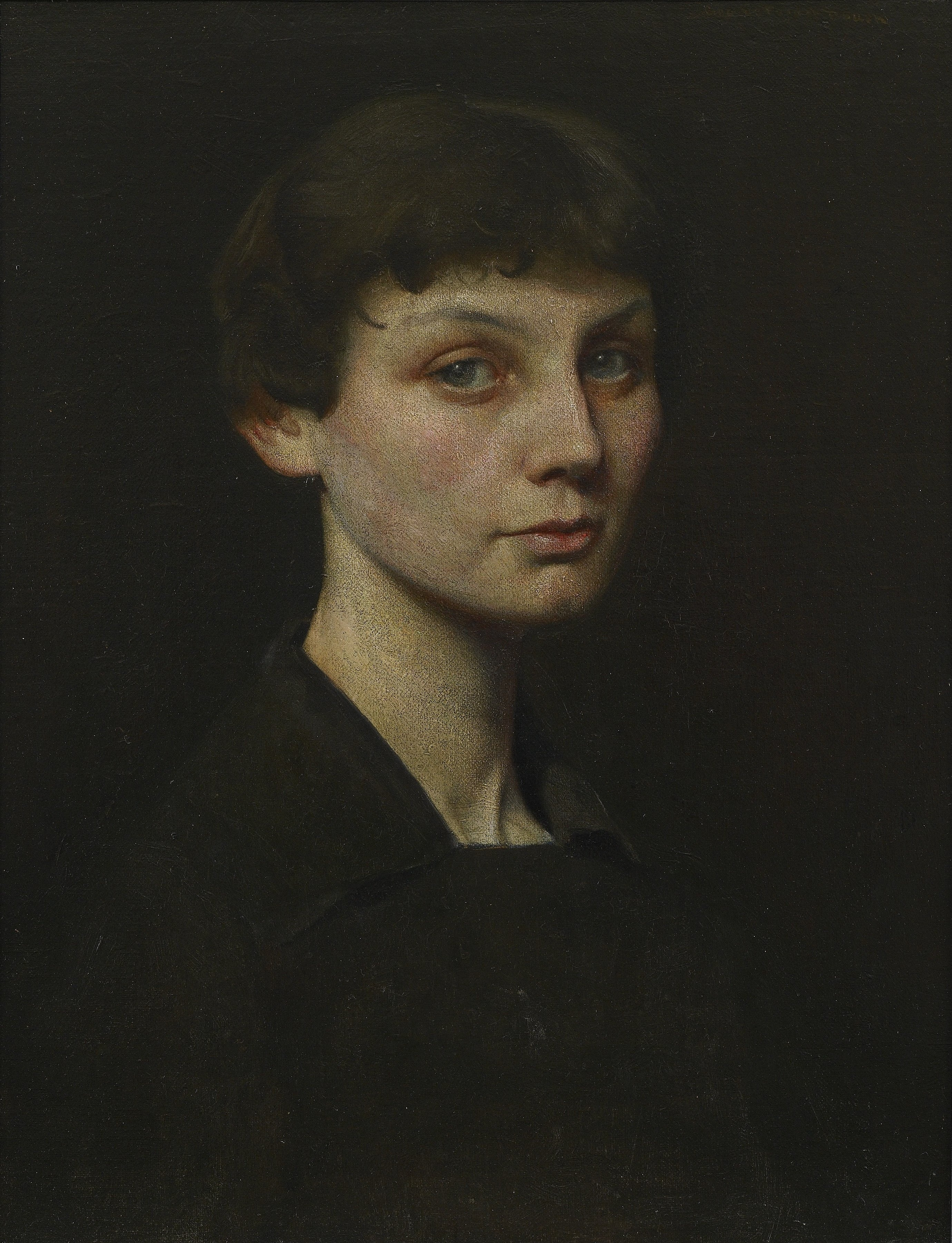
- 1888 portrait of Brush by her husband
- Born: Mary Taylor Whelpley; January 11, 1866; Boston, Massachusetts, United States
- Died: July 29, 1949 (aged 83); Dublin, New Hampshire, United States
- Resting place: Dublin Town Cemetery
- Other name: "Mittie" Taylor Brush
- Spouse: George de Forest Brush (m. 1886–1941; his death)
- Children: Eight, including Nancy Douglas Bowditch

Signature
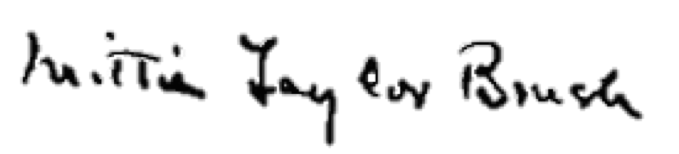

Mary Taylor Brush (January 11, 1866 – July 29, 1949) was an American aviator, artist, plane designer, and camouflage pioneer.

== Personal life ==
Mary Taylor Whelpley was born in Boston, Massachusetts, on January 11, 1866, to Mary Louise (née Breed) Whelpley and James Davenport Whelpley.

Mary Taylor met George de Forest Brush while studying at Art Students League of New York, where he was her teacher. After eloping, they married in New York City in 1886, on her twentieth birthday. They moved to Quebec initially, and returned to New York after two years. In the late 1890s, her health deteriorated and they briefly relocated to Florence, Italy, for treatment. They would spend some time in that area every year prior to World War I.

In either 1890 or 1901, George bought Townsend Farm in Dublin, New Hampshire, where the family previously had spent vacations, and they moved there. Brush was the main subject of her husband's art from the early 1890s until World War I, as he painted many 'Mother and Child' images of her with various of their children. The family were sometime neighbors of Amelia Earhart, and she and Mary Taylor developed a friendship.

Mary Taylor Brush died on July 29, 1949, in Dublin, New Hampshire, and was buried in the Dublin Town Cemetery.

== Career ==
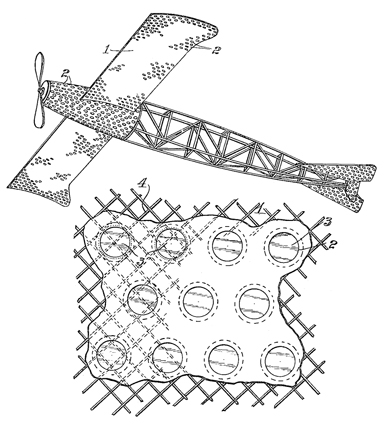
Mary Taylor Brush's 1917 drawing from U.S. patent 1,293,688

Mary Taylor Brush was an early aviator, having trained as a pilot prior to the outbreak of World War I. She designed and patented planes. Parts of one of her planes survive and have been exhibited in Eagles Mere Air Museum, Pennsylvania since 2011. She also developed camouflage for aircraft.

She and her husband, their eldest son Gerome (b. 1888), and their friend Abbott H. Thayer designed camouflage methods and contributed to World War I plane masking efforts. Thayer and the Brushes applied principles of art to engineering in order to develop and propose designs for military camouflage. At first, she tested her husband's camouflage designs, then she began experimenting with her own designs on a Morane-Borel monoplane purchased in 1916. A 1917 patent filed by Mary Taylor claimed that she was "able to produce a machine which is practically invisible when in the air".

While other artists employed to develop vehicle camouflage for the war used Modernist techniques to alter color perception, as academic artists, Thayer and the Brushes were said to be inspired by instances of camouflage in nature. Different variations on their proposed designs included giving planes light-colored underbellies and using counter-illumination to render the plane as bright as the sky and thereby, seeming to appear transparent. Exploring counter-illumination techniques, George used varnished silk to dress the plane, but it was not durable enough. Mary Taylor decided to punch holes in parts of the (linen) wings in her designs, pairing this with light bulbs in different parts of the fuselage to scatter light around the plane. She conducted tests of her designs on a plane she flew over Long Island and New Hampshire. Her designs were not used during World War I, but her concept was explored again and tested in World War II, including in the Yehudi lights project.

== See also ==
- Annie Renouf-Whelpley, artist and composer, Mary Taylor Brush's half-sister.
