= Edda Renouf =

American painter (born 1943)

- Born: 1943 (age 81–82); Mexico City, Mexico
- Education: Sarah Lawrence College (B.A., 1965); Columbia University (M.F.A., 1971)
- Style: Minimalist, monochromatic
- Website: eddarenouf.com

Edda Renouf (born 1943) is an American painter and printmaker. Renouf creates minimalist abstract paintings and drawings developed from her close attention to subtle properties of materials, such as the woven threads in linen canvas and the flax and cotton fibers of paper. Renouf often alters these supports by removing threads from the weave of a canvas, or in her drawings, creating lines by incising the paper.

== Early life ==
Renouf was born in Mexico City in 1943, the daughter of Edward Renouf, an artist, and his wife, Catharine Innes (Smith) Renouf. She studied from 1961 to 1965 at Sarah Lawrence College (BA 1965), from 1967 to 1968 at the Art Students League, and from 1968 to 1971 at Columbia University School of the Arts (MFA 1971). While earning her MFA, Renouf studied with several visiting artists including Richard Pousette-Dart, Carl Andre, and Jack Tworkov.

After graduating, Renouf received a painting fellowship from Columbia University that allowed her to live and work in Paris for a year. It was during this period that Renouf met dealer Yvon Lambert who, impressed by her work, gave Renouf her first solo exhibition in 1972.

== Career ==
Annely Juda Fine Art, Renouf's London representative, characterizes the artist as having a "deep engagement with her materials." When painting, Renouf alters the surface of her linen canvases before applying paint. She carefully removes threads from her canvases which she then reapplies, adds pigment, and then finally sands down the applied medium to bring the alterations she has made to the forefront. This process and composition is based on a grid, an important element in Renouf's practice, but her method of removing and reapplying threads allows her to introduce curves to her paintings that gives them a more organic structure.

In her paper works and drawings, Renouf incises fine lines before applying pastel pigments. She also works with watercolor, graphite, and ink. Like her paintings, Renouf's works on paper pair geometry with flexible organic elements. The contrast between the two calls attention to the underlying texture of the surface and the physical qualities of her materials.

Renouf has lived in New York and Paris since 1972. She divides her time between her studios in Paris and Washington Depot, Connecticut, with her husband, the French and American composer, Alain Middleton. Yvon Lambert Gallery represented Renouf until 1993. Renouf had her first solo exhibition in the United States with Blum Helman Gallery, New York in 1978. They represented Renouf in the United States until 2002. She is exhibited by Annely Juda Fine Art, London in Europe and by Barbara Mathes Gallery, New York in the United States.

Renouf was the recipient of a Pollock-Krasner Foundation grant in 1990. In 1997, Renouf was the subject of a major retrospective at the Staatliche Kunsthalle Karlsruhe in Karlsruhe, Germany. The National Museum of Women in the Arts in Washington, D.C., also presented a solo exhibition of Renouf's work in 2004 titled Revealed Structures. A catalogue was published alongside the exhibition.

== Collections ==
Renouf's works are held in the collections of the Akron Art Museum, the Albright–Knox Art Gallery, the Blanton Museum of Art, the British Museum, the Brooklyn Museum, the Centre Pompidou in Paris, the Art Institute of Chicago, the Cincinnati Art Museum, the Collection Lambert, Avignon, France, the Dallas Museum of Art, the Harvard Art Museums, the High Museum of Art, the Indianapolis Museum of Art, the Kunstmuseum Winterthur, Metropolitan Museum of Art, the Morgan Library & Museum, the Museum of Contemporary Art Chicago, the Museum of Contemporary Art, Los Angeles the Museum of Modern Art (New York City),National Gallery of Art in Washington DC, the Pérez Art Museum Miami, the Portland Museum of Art, the Tel Aviv Museum of Art, the CU Art Museum at the University of Colorado Boulder, the Walker Art Center, the Whitney Museum, and the Yale University Art Gallery.

== See also ==
- Edward Renouf, artist; Edda Renouf's father.
