= Samuel Whelpley =

American clergyman

Samuel Whelpley (1766 – July 14, 1817) was an American Presbyterian preacher and religious writer.

== Early life, education, and career ==
Born in Stockbridge, Massachusetts to Samuel and Hannah (née Olmstead) Whelpley, from Wilton, Fairfield County, Connecticut, Whelpley's parents were subsistence farmers who belonged to a small Baptist church, where Whelpley's father was a deacon.

As a child, Whelpley was described as "large for one of his age; was fond of sport, and averse to labour; was rash and reckless from the strength of his feelings, but chargeable with no vice; was awkward and ungainly in his appearance; but when he got hold of a book, he devoured it with the utmost avidity". Whelpley studied Theology under Dr. Stephen West, became a Baptist preacher, and on June 21, 1792, was ordained pastor of the congregation where his father was deacon. After preaching for some time to this church, Whelpley moved to West Stockbridge, where in 1792 a Baptist congregation was formed, and where in 1794 a church was built. He spent several years there before being persuaded to move to Green River, New York to lead a nondenominational congregation. Around 1798, he moved from Green River to Morristown, New Jersey, where he took charge of an academy, "gaining an increasing reputation as both a preacher and an academic instructor".

== Presbyterian Church career ==
On April 24, 1806, Whelpley formally sought to change to the Presbyterian Church, and completed his studies and was accepted into that church on October 8, 1806. In October 1809, Whelpley was sent to the Presbytery of Jersey, which had split from that of New York. In the latter part of 1809, a hemorrhage at the lungs, with some other alarming symptoms, led Whelpley to temporarily relocate to a more Southern climate. He went to Savannah, Georgia, taking with him his son Philip Melancthon and leaving the rest of his family at Newark. His health improved enough that he was able to take charge of a small school, which covered most of his expenses in Savannah. He returned to Newark in 1811, with his illness somewhat reduced. In July 1814, he sought to transfer to the Presbytery of New York, where he thereafter remained until his death.

By 1816, Whelpley had retired from preaching. In 1816 and 1817, Whelpley compiled several of his sermons into a volume entitled The Triangle: a Series of Numbers Upon Three Theological Points, which was "designed to prove the superiority of what was commonly called the New England Theology to the stricter form of Calvinism". Written largely in response to Ezra Stiles Ely's 1811 book, A Contrast Between Calvinism and Hopkinsianism, Whelpley "defended New England Calvinism and attacked what he called the 'triangular theology' of Ely", the asserted triangle consisting of the doctrines of "the imputation of Adam's sin, human inability, and limited atonement". The Triangle was deemed "a work of no inconsiderable power; but it met the severest condemnation on the one hand, while it was received with the highest praise on the other".

== Personal life ==
While living in Stockbridge, Whelpley married Nancy Wheaton of West Stockbridge. They had at least three children, two of whom entered the ministry. Whelpley's fragile health became increasingly burdensome over the course of his life, and in the end he "languished for some time in a state of great debility", and died at the age of 51.

In addition to The Triangle, Whelpley wrote "Compend of Ancient and Modern History; a Sermon on the Immortality of the Soul", delivered at Newark in 1804; "Thoughts on the state of departed Souls: a Sermon", delivered at Morristown in 1807; and a Sermon entitled "The destruction of wicked nations; Letters on Capital Punishment and War, addressed to Governor Strong", an Oration delivered at Morristown on July 4, 1809 (Whelpley was too unwell at the time to deliver it, and it was read by his son, Philip Melancthon).
