= Annie Renouf-Whelpley =

American painter, singer, composer (1849–1930)

- Annie Renouf-Whelpley in 1885.
- Born: Annie Vincent Whelpley; October 18, 1849; New York City, U.S.
- Died: May 16, 1930 (aged 80); Florence, Italy
- Known for: Painting
- Movement: Romanticism
- Spouse: Edward Renouf (m. 1871; died 1934)

Annie Renouf-Whelpley (October 18, 1849 – May 16, 1930) was an expatriate American artist, singer and composer.

== Early life (1849–1871) ==
Annie Vincent Whelpley was born in New York City in 1849, the daughter and only child of Dr. James Davenport Whelpley (1817–1872) and his wife Anna Marie Wells (1828–1860). James Whelpley was a graduate of Yale College (1837), a physician, philosopher, metallurgist, Central American adventurer, and for a time editor and part-owner of the American Whig Review. His wife, Anna Wells, was the daughter of the Boston poets Thomas Wells (1790–1861) and Anna Maria Foster Wells (1795–1868), and a great-granddaughter of Massachusetts governor Samuel Adams.

When Annie Whelpley was ten years old, she appeared in the 1860 census, living in New York with her parents. Her mother died there on July 9, 1860, and the following year, at Dedham, Massachusetts, on September 19, 1861, her father married Mary Louise Breed (1841–1932). They had three children: James Davenport Whelpley, Jr. (1863–1948); Mary Taylor Whelpley Brush (1866–1949), an artist and aviator; and Philip Breed Whelpley (1870–1958), all born in Boston.

Annie Whelpley married at Boston on February 8, 1871, and her father died there on April 15, 1872.

== Expatriate years (1871–1930) ==
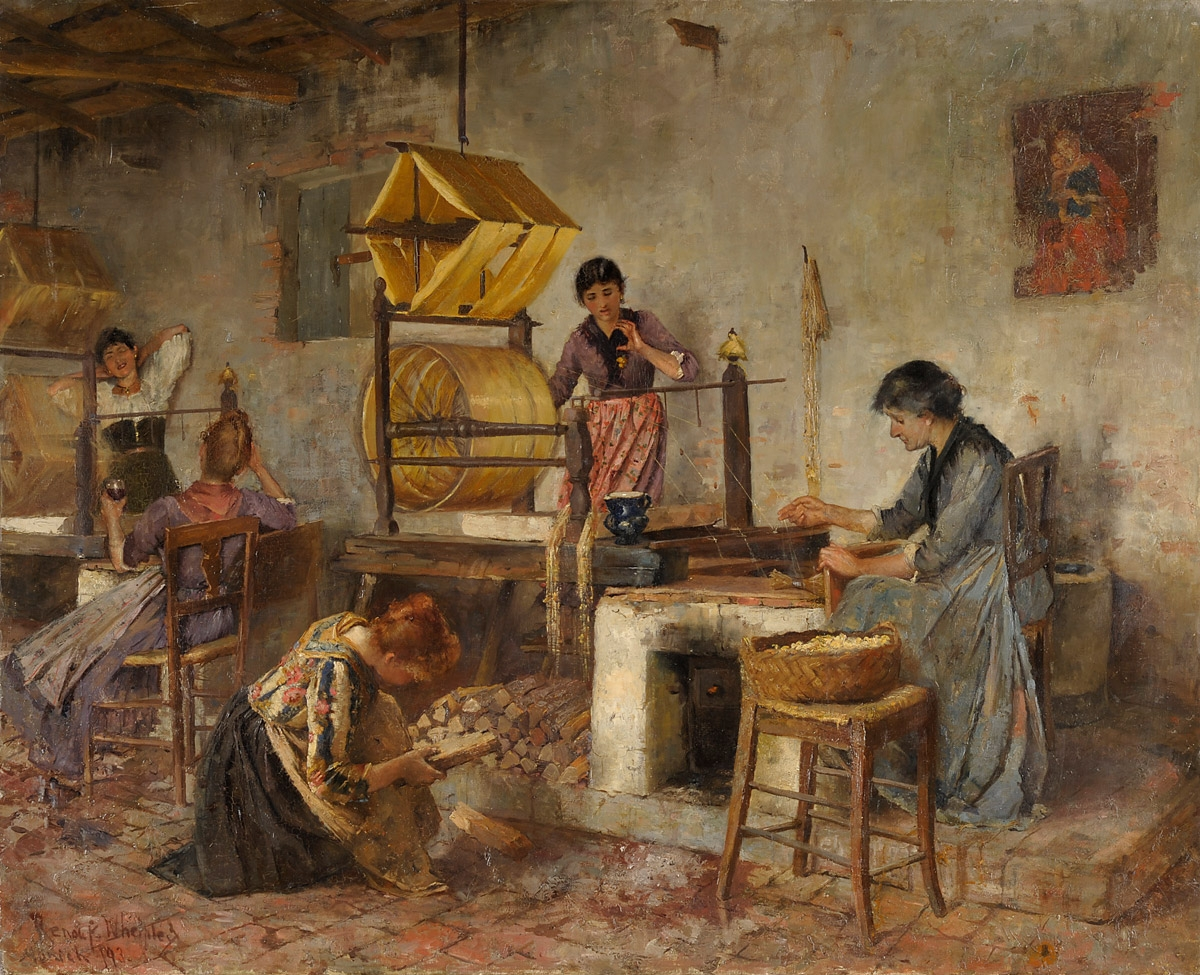
Frauen in der Webstube (trans: Women in the Weaving Room), signed by "Renouf-Whelpley, Munich, 1893"

Portrait of Mlle. von Hausen of the Royal Theater of Braunschweig, exhibited by Annie Renouf-Whelpley at Paris in 1892, and Chicago in 1893.

On February 8, 1871, Rev. William Rounseville Alger married Annie Whelpley and Edward Renouf at All Souls Unitarian Church, Roxbury, Massachusetts, The couple had two children: Edward Davenport Renouf (1872–1954), born in Boston, and Vincent Adams Renouf (1876–1910), born in Düsseldorf, Germany (who later became a professor of history and political economics at Tianjin University). The children grew up in Germany, where in 1880 Edward Renouf received the degree of Doctor of Philosophy from the University of Freiberg, and where, from 1880 until 1885, he taught chemistry at the Ludwig-Maximilians-Universität München. In 1885, he left his family to take a position as professor of chemistry on the faculty of Johns Hopkins University in Baltimore, where he would teach until his retirement in 1911.

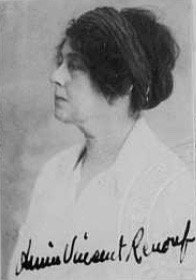
Annie Renouf-Whelpley in 1922.

According to one writer, Annie Whelpley was "an accomplished singer and artist." Using the nom de plume A. Vincent Renouf-Whelpley, she exhibited her paintings at the National Academy of Design in 1886, and at an exhibition of the Société Nationale des Beaux-Arts in 1892. Among the oil paintings exhibited in Chicago at the World's Columbian Exposition of 1893 was No. 1098, Portrait of Mlle. Hausen, by A. Renouf Whelpley (Nos. 1099–1104 were works of Whistler's).

When Edward Renouf returned to the United States in 1885 to teach at Johns Hopkins, he and Annie Renouf effectively separated. In her passport application in 1915, she submitted an affidavit explaining her protracted stay abroad: "... I ceased to reside in the United States about 1881 ... I have since resided temporarily at Germany, Austria, Italy and Switzerland ... I arrived at Locarno, Switzerland where I am now temporarily residing in December 1915; I came to Europe to engage in my work as a painter and composer and am now obliged to remain here on account of my health .... I maintain the following ties of family in the United States: husband, professor Edward Renouf, Monkton, Maryland and brother: James Davenport Whelpley, c/o Century Magazine, New York ... my husband owns real estate and I receive $1,500 annually from him."

Annie Renouf died at Florence, Italy on May 4, 1930, and was buried in the Cimitero degli Allori. Edward Renouf died on November 1, 1934, and his remains were interred at St. Mary the Virgin Church Cemetery, in Warwick Parish, Bermuda.

== See also ==
- James Davenport Whelpley, physician and author; Annie Renouf-Whelpley's father.
- Edward Renouf, chemistry professor, Annie Renouf-Whelpley’s husband.
- Anna Maria Wells, poet; Annie Renouf-Whelpley's grandmother.
- Edward Renouf, artist, Annie Renouf-Whelpley's grandson.
- Webster Wells, mathematician; Annie Renouf-Whelpley’s first cousin.
- Joseph Morrill Wells, architect; Annie Renouf-Whelpley’s first cousin.
- Samuel Adams, Annie Renouf-Whelpley's great-grandfather.
