= James Davenport Whelpley =

American physician, author, editor, inventor, and metallurgist

- Born: January 23, 1817; New York City, US
- Died: April 15, 1872 (aged 55); Boston, Massachusetts, US
- Education: Yale College (AB)
- Occupations: Physician, author, editor, metallurgist
- Known for: The American Review: A Whig Journal

James Davenport Whelpley (1817–1872) was an American physician, author, editor, inventor, and metallurgist.

== Early life and education ==
James Whelpley was born in New York City on January 23, 1817, the son of Rev. Philip Melanchthon Whelpley (December 22, 1794 – July 17, 1824) and his wife, Abigail Fitch Davenport (November 17, 1791 – June 1864). Philip Whelpley was, from May 1815 until his death, the pastor of the First Presbyterian Church, then situated on Wall Street in New York City. Abigail Whelpley was a descendant of Rev. John Davenport, the first minister of New Haven colony.

In a lecture given in 1880, William E. Dodge recalled Rev. Whelpley:

I remember when young Philip Melanchthon Whelpley was pastor of the Wall Street Church...He was settled when only about twenty-one, was a most eloquent man, but suffered from dyspepsia; he lived in Greenwich Street back of Trinity Church. Some adventurous man had put up four small houses on White Street, then just opened, near Broadway, and as Mr. Whelpley felt the need of exercise, and the rent was very low, he ventured to hire one of these.

After Philip Whelpley's death in 1824, Abigail Whelpley returned to New Haven, where she came under the protection of her cousin James Hillhouse. He built an elegant neoclassical house for her and her two sons at 33 Hillhouse Avenue, completed in 1827, where they lived until at least 1840.

According to James Whelpley's obituary published by the American Academy of Arts and Science, after his father's death, "he was sent to school at New Haven, where, at an early age, he showed a decided taste for chemical study and experimentation." In New Haven, he prepared for college at the Hopkins Grammar School, graduating alongside his brother, Philip M. Whelpley, Jr., in 1833. James Whelpley entered Yale College that same year, and graduated with an AB degree in 1837.

Whelpley, who minded not having a father, found a mentor in Benjamin Silliman (1779–1864), a family friend, the first professor of chemistry at Yale, and the first to give there a scientific lecture on any subject. In a letter to Silliman's son in 1862, Whelpley wrote:

I wish to be particularly remembered to Professor Silliman...it is difficult for me to express the emotions which affected me when I saw him last summer—emotions of reverence and affection. I felt then that his character had been of more value to me in producing good in my own life than those of any other man. It was my great misfortune in early life to have no father. It was not only a misfortune but a constant cause of regret and sorrow. Mr. Silliman, by the dignity and kindness of his life, impressed me with just views, and by the facilities which he afforded me when young, enabled me to acquire a truly scientific and practical education. I remember too, all the little social benefits and kindnesses which I received in his family, and I remember them with gratitude and a pleasure which is more pure as years advance.

== Medical and scientific interests (1837–1846) ==
After graduating from Yale, Whelpley assisted Henry Darwin Rogers with his Geological Survey of Pennsylvania. The survey was first proposed in 1832 by the Geological Society of Pennsylvania. In 1836, the state legislature authorized an annual appropriation of $6,400 for five years and appointed Rogers to lead the survey in the position of State Geologist. After two years, Whelpley left the survey to study medicine, first at the Berkshire Medical College and then at Yale's Medical School.

Whelpley graduated from the Medical Department of Yale College, in January 1842, having prepared a thesis dissertation, On the Unity of the Organic System, and after successfully passing an interview conducted by the "Committee for the Examination of Candidates for Degrees and Licenses."

After Whelpley received his medical degree, he went to Brooklyn, New York, intending to practice his chosen profession, but on account of ill-health he returned to New Haven where he occupied himself with scientific study and literary pursuits.

== American Whig Journal (1847–1852) ==
Beginning in 1845, Whelpley regularly contributed articles, stories, and poems to the American Whig Review, owned and edited by George H. Colton. In 1847, Whelpley moved to New York to help an ailing Colton edit the journal. In January 1848, after Colton's death, his executors introduced Whelpley in the journal's seventh volume:

"We beg to inform the patrons of this Review, and all interested, that the work will continue to be published as heretofore, at No. 18 Nassau Street, and that the plan for its improvement, devised by the late editor, will be carried out. To this end [we] have engaged the services of James D. Whelpley, Esq.; a gentleman who has been connected with the Review from the beginning, as one of its most valuable contributors, and for a year past, intimately associated with the late lamented editor in conducting it; and in whose abilities, principles, and judgement, we have the utmost confidence.

In the U.S. census, dated June 1, 1850, Whelpley was living in New York with his wife, daughter, and mother-in-law; his occupation "editor."

The journal's publishers issued the final, sixteenth volume in 1852.

== Adventures in Central America ==
In early 1854, Whelpley, by then living in San Francisco, formed an association with his brother-in-law William Vincent Wells (1826–1876) and others, called the Honduras Mining and Trading Company, a venture Whelpley had first contemplated while editing the American Whig Review (according to a memorial essay written in 1873 by the secretary of Yale's class of 1837).

[Whelpley] conceived the idea of establishing a commercial colony in Honduras to develop the resources of that country and bring it into closer relations with the United States. To this end he obtained extensive grants of land and valuable commercial privileges from the Honduras Government. He commenced the building of steamers and barges for the navigation of the Honduras rivers...and secured more than 3,000 emigrants for the proposed colony.

Meanwhile, in May 1855, American mercenary William Walker (1824–1860) led a force of 110 men on a private expedition to Central America with the intention of forcibly establishing a colony based on slave labor in Nicaragua. Walker managed to take control of the country and had himself elected president in July 1856. According to Whelpley's Yale class secretary,

[Whelpley's] arrangements were nearly complete when he heard that [Walker]...had gone to Honduras to take forcible advantage of the colonists' labors and establish a military despotism and slavery over the country. Accompanied by an armed party of fifty men, Dr. Whelpley went to Honduras to protect what he could there, and was detained by force by Walker, for nearly a year, enduring great privation and suffering, and at the same time impressed into service as surgeon and physician, taking care of the sick and wounded.

In a letter to his class secretary, Whelpley described his time in captivity:

During my forced detention I was continually active as a physician and hospital surgeon...We lived as though there was no future for us in this world, in the perpetual society of and view of death in its most revolting and horrible shapes, in the companionship of assassins and thieves, conscious of the injustice of the war into which we had been forced, and studying only by what means to escape...I succeeded with a few others in working my way to the seaport and then stealing in the darkness of night on board a vessel, and then to California, from which I came at once to New York...My brother Philip was shot through the head at the Battle of St. George.

Byron Cole, one of Walker's lieutenants, led (at Walker's request) an exploratory expedition from July 22 to August 23, 1856, from Granada to Chontales. Cole was accompanied by "sixteen volunteers, all reliable and trustworthy men," among them Dr. James Whelpley. In his report, Cole wrote that "a mass of geographical and geological information in regard to this region was collected by Dr. Whelpley, who attended the expedition as physician and secretary." Cole noted that when the group stayed for a few days near Acoyapa, "our physician had an opportunity at this, as at several other haciendas, of rendering some important medical and surgical services, for which a great deal of sincere gratitude was expressed by the relatives of the patients."

After Whelpley's return to New York, Harper's Weekly published numerous accounts of Walker's activities in Central America (many if not all written by Whelpley) beginning on January 3, 1857, and concluding on October 13, 1860, with a report of Walker's capture and execution.

== Metallurgy ==
In January 1848, Whelpley married Anna Maria Wells (1828–1860), of Roxbury, Massachusetts, daughter of the poets Thomas and Anna Maria Wells. As of June 1, 1860, they were living in New York City with their daughter, Annie Vincent Whelpley (1849–1930).

Anna Maria Whelpley died on July 9, 1860, and the following year Dr. Whelpley married a second time, at Dedham, Massachusetts, to Mary Louise Breed (October 11, 1841 – May 19, 1932), the Virginia-born daughter of a Baptist minister. They lived in Boston where they had three children: author James Davenport Whelpley, Jr. (June 24, 1863 – March 18, 1948); artist and aviator Mary Taylor Whelpley (January 11, 1866 – July 29, 1949); and artist and photographer Philip Breed Whelpley (May 1, 1870 – April 3, 1958).

Whelpley & Storer, Boston City Directory, 1867.

After his second marriage, and as early as 1863, Whelpley formed a partnership with Col. Jacob Jones Storer (1826–1902), to design and manufacturer mining equipment. (Storer, a New Hampshire born son of Adm. George Washington Storer, had entered military service as a major with the 13th New Hampshire Infantry Regiment on September 23, 1862, was promoted to lieutenant colonel on June 1, 1863, and was mustered out in May 1864 owing to disability.) In 1867, The American Journal of Science and Arts described Whelpley & Storer's "General Metallurgical method", noting that:

It is claimed by the designers...that copper can in this way be produced at about one third the cost of the ordinary method. The small consumption of fuel, and the mechanical facilities afforded for handling great masses of material, are such, that the new method will probably be found especially advantageous, in the treatment of low-grade ores, in regions where transportation is difficult, and fuel scarce.

James Whelpley died on April 15, 1872, from the complications of tuberculosis. The following year, his friend and business partner Jacob Storer married Whelpley's widow. Jacob Storer died in Boston on November 11, 1902, and Mary Louise Whelpley Storer died in San Diego, California on March 19, 1932.

== Written works (a partial list) ==
=== Scientific and historical articles ===
- James Dwight Dana and James Whelpley, "On two American Species of the Genus Hydrachna," in The American Journal of Science and Arts, Vol. 30, No. 2 (July 1836), p. 354.
- James D. Whelpley, "The Hindoos, their Laws, Customs, and Religion," in The American Whig Review, Vol. 1 (March 1845), p. 290.
- James D. Whelpley, "Castes and Occupations of India," in The American Whig Review, Vol. 1 (April 1845), p. 394.
- James D. Whelpley, "Idea of an Atom, suggested by Phenomena of Weight and Temperature," in The American Journal of Science and Arts, Vol. 48, No. 2 (April 1845), p. 352.
- James D. Whelpley, "On the mechanical and chemical treatment of gold and other metals," in The American Journal of Science and Arts, Vol. 37 (second series), No. 109 (May 1864), p. 401.
- James D. Whelpley, "Birth of the Solar System," in The Atlantic Monthly (February 1869).
- James D. Whelpley, "Critical Examination of the Ideas of Inertia and Gravitation," in Von Nostrand's Eclectic Engineering Magazine, Vol. 5, No. 35 (November 1871), p. 496.
- James D. Whelpley, "Critical Examination of the Ideas of Inertia and Momentum," in Von Nostrand's Eclectic Engineering Magazine, Vol. 6, No. 37 (January 1972), p. 81.

=== Short stories ===
- J. D. Whelpley, "Zadec's Story, The Magician," in The American Whig Review, Vol. 4 (October 1846), p. 373.
- J. D. Whelpley, "The Denslow Palace," in The Atlantic Monthly (July 1858).
- James Davenport Whelpley, "The Lady of Bellisle," in Harpers New Monthly (1859).
- James Davenport Whelpley, "He Was Always Such a Fool," in Harpers New Monthly (January 1860), p. 93.
- James Davenport Whelpley, "Family at Brantone," in Harpers New Monthly (1862).
- James Davenport Whelpley, "The Atoms of Chladni," in Harpers New Monthly (January 1862).
- James Davenport Whelpley, "Courtship by Character," in Harpers New Monthly (January 1862).

=== Poems ===
- J. D. Whelpely, "April", in The American Whig Review, Vol. 5 (April 1847), p. 339.
- J. D. Whelpely, "Covetousness", in The American Whig Review, Vol. 6 (December 1847), p. 618.

=== Writing on metallurgy ===
- Jacob J. Storer and James Davenport Whelpley, Whelpley & Storer's New Method of Separating Metals from Sulphurets and Other Ores, with a Brief Description of Furnace and Machinery Employed (1866).
- James Davenport Whelpley, The Boston Milling & Manufacturing Co.'s Improved Machinery for Working Gold and Silver Ores (1866).
- Jacob J. Storer and James Davenport Whelpley, Crushing and Pulverizing Machinery Breakers and Pulverizers, Invented and Patented by James D. Whelpley and Jacob J. Storer, Manufactured and Sold by Jacob J. Storer (Boston: 1869).
- James D. Whelpley and J.J. Storer, Pulverized Fuel Process and Method of Setting Boilers for the Consumption of Waste Coal (Boston: 1871).
- James D. Whelpley, M.D., "On the Fusion of Wrought or Fibrous Iron in the Large Way in Reverberatory Furnaces," in Von Nostrand's Eclectic Engineering Magazine, Vol. 5, No. 31 (July 1971), p. 43.
- Jacob J. Storer and James D. Whelpley, "Comparative Efficiency of Different Kinds of Boiler Plates for Steam Generation," in Scientific American, Vol. 25, No. 21 (November 18, 1871), p. 324.

== See also ==
- Annie Renouf-Whelpley, artist and composer, James Whelpley's daughter.
- Mary Taylor Brush, artist and aviator, James Whelpley's daughter.
- Samuel Whelpley, Baptist and Presbyterian minister, James Whelpley's grandfather.
- William Vincent Wells, author and journalist, James Whelpley's brother-in-law.
- Vincent Adams Renouf, educator and historian, James Whelpley's grandson.
