= William Vincent Wells =

American writer (1826–1876)

- Born: February 2, 1826; Boston, Massachusetts, U.S.
- Died: June 1, 1876 (aged 50); Napa, California, U.S.
- Occupations: Author and editor
- Known for: The Life and Public Services of Samuel Adams (1865)

William Vincent Wells (1826–1876) was an American author and journalist, best known for his three volume biography of his ancestor Samuel Adams, the 4th Governor of the state of Massachusetts.

== Early life and education ==
William Vincent Wells was born in Boston in 1826, the son of poets Thomas Wells (1790–1861) and Anna Maria (Foster) Wells (1795–1868). He was a great-grandson of Massachusetts Governor Samuel Adams (1722–1803), and an uncle of mathematician Webster Wells, architect Joseph Morrill Wells, and silent film actress Mai Wells. William Wells grew up in Boston where he was educated "at the common schools of that city," but in 1834, his father left home to join the Navy, serving aboard the frigate USS Potomac as schoolmaster, and serving, from December 1836 until July 1838, aboard the USS Constitution as private secretary to Commodore Jesse Elliott, Commander of the Navy's Mediterranean Squadron. During his father's time abroad, Wells's mother earned her living as an educator (the historian Sidney Perley wrote in an 1889 sketch that "Mrs. Wells' chief attention was given to her school for young ladies"). She and some of her children lived in South Carolina during at least part of the couple's separation.

William Wells probably didn't accompany his mother on her journey to the South. According to one family historian, Wells "went to sea, when a young boy, in a vessel belonging to his mother's cousin, Epes Sargent." Writing in 1876, the author of Wells's obituary noted: "He started out from Boston at an early age to follow the sea, and before he had reached his majority found himself Second Mate of a Boston ship in the European trade, which position gave him opportunities, when in European ports, of visiting Art Galleries and other objects calculated to improve the mind and cultivate the taste."

== California Gold Rush ==
The California Gold Rush was precipitated by James W. Marshall's discovery on January 24, 1848, of a gold nugget in the raceway of a sawmill he was building. By the fall of 1848, news of his discovery had attracted a large number of prospectors from Mexico and South America, and by the end of 1848, would-be prospectors in New England began to form stock companies to arrange transportation to California. Some went by land, others by sea. One of these, the Boston and California Joint Stock Mining and Trading Company, was organized at the end of 1848, its membership limited to 150 men. William Vincent Wells was among them, and was elected First Mate of the company's 700-ton ship, the Edward Everett. The company left Boston in January 1849 and sailed into San Francisco Bay on July 6. Among the diverse items in its cargo was a small steamship christened the Pioneer, intended to carry supplies to the gold fields. The company appointed Wells to be Captain of the steamship, and in a letter sent back home, he wrote:

I have only a few minutes to tell you we are alive and well. The Company has dissolved. The votes of a majority in the mines did it. Being among those engaged in transporting provisions up by boat I did not hear of it until now. I am at present bound up to join Lull at the mines. We are to operate together while the mining season lasts. The dividend will amount to about $175 per man. The company dissolved after about two days’ digging. One-half of them would not work. I made one trip up to Sacramento as Captain of the Pioneer, the first steamer to run on the river. We have sold her to Simmons and Hutchinson for $6000. The [Edward Everett] will not fetch more than $15,000; I can go Captain of her for $300 a month if I wish.

But rather than becoming a sea-captain, in October 1853, Wells became a part owner with his brother-in-law James Davenport Whelpley of the San Francisco newspaper the Commercial Advertiser.

== Honduras ==
On March 14, 1854, Whelpley published a notice that he was no longer the proprietor and editor of the Commercial Advertiser, and presumably Wells also sold his share. Having read published news reports of gold deposits in Honduras along the Patuca River, and the willingness of the Honduran government to grant exclusive mining rights to entrepreneurs able to raise sufficient capital, Wells, Whelpley, and several others formed the Honduras Mining and Trading Company. They traveled to Honduras where they obtained extensive grants of land and valuable commercial privileges from the government, commenced building steamers and barges to navigate the river, and began recruiting colonists willing to settle in Honduras. In January 1855, a newspaper reported that Wells was in Honduras investigating the feasibility of a new route for an inter-oceanic railroad to rival the one then under construction across Panama.

Meanwhile, in May 1855, American mercenary William Walker (1824–1860) led a force of 110 men on a private expedition to Central America with the intention of forcibly establishing a colony based on slave labor in Nicaragua. Walker managed to take control of the country and had himself elected president in July 1856. Whelpley later claimed that Walker then went to Honduras to forcibly establish a colony there. Accompanied by an armed party of fifty men, Whelpley went to Honduras to protect what he could of his investments there, but was detained by force by Walker for nearly a year, and impressed into service as a surgeon and physician.

Wells and Whelpley failed to establish a colony in Honduras, but Wells persevered, publishing in 1857, Explorations and adventures in Honduras, a book The New York Times called:

A nine months' labor and travel, it has appeared a valuable and satisfactory book, historically, critically, and with reference to its end, which is to induce the settlement of Eastern Honduras by Americans. The personal narrative of travels are a literal, but beautiful and well worded narrative of the journey, adventures, and researches of the author in Eastern Honduras.

== Biography of Samuel Adams ==
Efforts to prepare a biography of Samuel Adams date back to 1815 when his grandson Samuel Adams Wells (1787–1840) began to compile what remained of his papers, an effort interrupted by his death but resumed by Wells's nephew William V. Wells, who completed in 1865 a three-volume biography entitled The life and public services of Samuel Adams. The younger Wells described his intent in writing the book in its introduction:

…to represent him as he appeared to those who personally knew him, — friends and enemies, — to show the great space he filled in the Revolution, and to disclose, by means of his own private letters and trustworthy contemporary evidence, the measures by which he so largely aided in accomplishing American liberty.

== Clerk to the Mayor of San Francisco and final years ==
When Thomas Henry Selby, a Republican, was elected Mayor of San Francisco at the end of 1869, he appointed Wells to be his Clerk, which office he held throughout Selby's term (ending December 1871). Selby's successor, William Alvord, also a Republican, appointed Wells to the same position during his term (ending November 1873). Wells acted as Clerk for several months for Alvord's successor, Mayor James Otis, "but by this time, his health had so essentially failed that it was unequal to the duties and responsibilities of the position." Wells retired in the summer of 1874 from public life.

Wells died on June 1, 1876, in Napa, California at the Napa Insane Asylum. The author of Wells's memorial in the Daily Alta, writing after "more than a quarter of a century's intimate acquaintance and intimate friendship," recalled his, "...high appreciation of [Wells's] mental capacities, his indomitable energy, his wonderful activity of mind and body, until disease which had silently and unsuspected made its attack, developed suddenly in a form which defied all human skill."

Wells had married Laura Ann (Wheelock) Jones on January 19, 1854. She died on March 9, 1880, and a few weeks before her death, the Daily Alta announced a benefit concert:

A musical matinee is to be given at the Bush Street Theater on the afternoon of Thursday the 26th instant, for the benefit of the widow of the late William V. Wells, who was clerk of Mayors Selby and Alvord, and, previously, for a long time a prominent journalist of this city. Mrs. Wells will certainly be pleasantly remembered by many of our readers as Laura Jones, a soprano singer of far above average merit, who sang for many years in church and concert in this city. For the benefit matinee, many of our most prominent artists have promised their services. Among them are the Misses Jovita and Eugenia Ferrer, Miss Rightmire, Mr. Louis Lisser, the Schmidt String Quartette, Messrs. Julius and Gustav Hinrichs, Ernst Schlotte, Ferdinand Urban, Manro Solano, M. T. Ferrer, and others...Tickets may be obtained at the leading music stores, or of Mrs. Wells at 1512 Bush Street.

Both William Wells and Laura Wells were buried in San Francisco's old Masonic cemetery.

== Bibliography ==
=== Writing by William V. Wells (in journals) ===
- William V. Wells, "Broad Away — No.1," in The Pioneer Magazine, Vol. 4, No. 1 (July 1855), pp. 26–33.
- William V. Wells, "Wild life in Oregon," in Harper's New Monthly Magazine, Vol. 13, No. 77 (October 1856), pp. 588–608.
- William V. Wells, "How we get gold in California, by a miner of the year '49," in Harper's New Monthly Magazine, Vol. 20, No. 119 (April 1860), pp. 598–616.
- William V. Wells, "Fishing adventures on the Newfoundland banks," in Harper's New Monthly Magazine, Vol. 22, No. 130 (March 1861), pp. 456–471.
- William V. Wells, "The quicksilver mines of New Almaden," in Harper's New Monthly Magazine, Vol. 27, No. 47 (June 1863), pp. 25–41.
- William V. Wells, "Ascent of Popocatepetl," in Harper's New Monthly Magazine, Vol. 31, No. 186 (November 1865), pp. 681–699.
- William V. Wells, "High Noon of the Empire," in The Overland Monthly, Vol. 1, No. 1 (July 1868), pp. 21–28.
- William V. Wells, "A Court Ball at the Palace of Mexico," in The Overland Monthly, Vol. 1, No. 2 (August 1868), pp. 105–112.

=== Writing by William V. Wells (published books) ===
- William V. Wells, Walker's expedition to Nicaragua (New York: Stringer & Townsend, 1856).
- William V. Wells, Explorations and adventures in Honduras (New York: Harper & Brothers, 1857).
- William V. Wells, The life and public services of Samuel Adams (Boston: Little, Brown, and Company, 1865).
- Oscar T. Shuck (editor), William V. Wells (contributor), Representative and leading men of the Pacific (San Francisco: Bacon and Company, 1870).

=== Writing about William V. Wells ===
- "Adventures in Honduras," a book review in The New York Times, August 1, 1857, p. 2.
- "Wells's Life and Services of Samuel Adams," a book review in The North American Review, Vol. 102, No. 211 (April 1866), pp. 614–619.

== See also ==
- Anna Maria Wells, poet, William Wells's mother.
- James Davenport Whelpley, author, William Wells's brother-in-law.
