= Andrew Jackson Bryant =

17th Mayor of San Francisco from 1875 to 1879

- Bryant c. 1879

17th Mayor of San Francisco
- In office December 5, 1875 – December 1, 1879
- Preceded by: George Hewston
- Succeeded by: Isaac Smith Kalloch

Personal details
- Born: October 30, 1831 Effingham, New Hampshire, US
- Died: May 11, 1888 (aged 56) San Francisco, California, US

Andrew Jackson Bryant (October 30, 1831 – May 11, 1888) was an American politician who was the 17th mayor of San Francisco from 1875 to 1879. Mayor during an economic depression that struck San Francisco and the rest of the country, Bryant was a strong advocate for an eight-hour work day as well as legislation to halt the immigration of Chinese laborers into the state. A prominent insurance man and a sportsman, he drowned in the San Francisco Bay after falling from a ferryboat.

== Early life ==
Bryant was born in Effingham, New Hampshire on October 30, 1831. As a young man, he sailed around the tip of South America to San Francisco, where he arrived in 1850 and went directly to the Gold Country of California. After a "year's hard work," however, he returned to San Francisco "for medical treatment," and then went to Benicia, California, where in 1854–55 was the city marshal and in 1856 he was a deputy sheriff.

In 1856 the California Legislature met in Benicia, and when it disbanded, Bryant moved to Sacramento, the new state capital, where he opened a general merchandising business with George W. Chesley and George L. Bradley, which lasted four years. He then "sold out, going into the wholesale liquor business with a Mr. Morrison." He moved back to San Francisco and worked in such enterprises as an insurance agency and an express business.

== Career ==
In San Francisco he became active in the Democratic Party, and in 1866 President Andrew Johnson commissioned him a naval officer "with all the honors and benefits to be derived therefrom." William Heintz, his biographer, said that Bryant "kept this position until 1870 without ever sailing beyond the Golden Gate."

In 1871 Bryant was a member of the Finance Committee of the State Investment Insurance Company. He continued his career in insurance while he was serving as mayor of San Francisco (below), and since 1882 he was president of the California Electric Lighting Company. He was known as a "prominent figure in insurance circles."

== Political career ==
=== San Francisco ===
Bryant's support for an eight-hour working day and his calling for legislation to halt the "influx" of Chinese laborers to California attracted the attention of Democratic leaders, and he secured the nomination for San Francisco mayor in 1875.

Some attacked him as being opposed to "Democracy," as the Democratic Party was sometimes called in those days. One newspaper responded: "The charge that he is unorthodox in his Democracy is absurd. . . . If . . . he cooperated with the Republican Party, he only did what hundreds of thousands of Democrats did; which if they had not done, the Union would have been destroyed." It added: "He will break up that devilish den of Chinese that now corrupt and poison the very heart of San Francisco."

He was elected to a two-year term mayor of San Francisco in September 1875 to replace James Otis. The votes were 9,792 for Bryant; 9,486 for Charles Clayton, former county supervisor; and 4,106 for Andrew Hallidie, the builder of San Francisco's first cable car. He was reelected in 1877, over his opponent, Monroe Ashbury.

In his first message to the Board of Supervisors in 1875, Bryant stated:

The Chinese dens are a disgrace to our city. I recommend that one of our vacant squares or lots in the outskirts of the city be appropriated, and that a cheap, rough building be erected of two wards, one for women and the other for men, designed expressly for this class. . . . have them fed while in prison upon the same character of cheap food to which they have become accustomed, and made to work upon our public squares. . . . In one year the dens of gambling and lewdness that now offend decency on our public streets will be driven out of sight, [and] our jails will be relieved of these pests. . . .

In May 1876 he announced he had appointed a committee of three men to travel to Washington to "lay the Chinese question before Congress." The next month he moved at a meeting of the Police Commission that all Chinese special police officers be dismissed because they "were doing nothing in the way of preventing crime."

In the same message he noted that "punishing petty criminals by long terms of imprisonment seems to punish only the tax-payer with their support" and that "shorter terms of imprisonment, with severer punishment while under control, are required," such as "work in the chain-gang, solitary confinement and stricter discipline."

He called it a "gross injustice to send children of tender years" to the city's Industrial School "who, guiltless of crime, but for the misfortune of being orphans or having worthless parents. are there confined and treated as criminals, forced to associate with depravity, and when released [are] sent forth penniless and branded with a badge of disgrace." He urged establishment of separate "wards" for these children.

In running for mayor, Bryant "emphatically condemned the purchase of the Spring Valley Water Company by the city, declaring it not worth half the price being asked." After he was sworn into office, he appointed two supervisors to work with the company in setting the rates.

In the depths of the Long Depression of 1873–79, by June 1877 an estimated thirty thousand San Franciscans were unemployed, and workers' camps sprang up on the sandlots south of the new City Hall at Macallister and Larkin streets. Bryant and others "went so far as to lay the blame for the depression directly on Chinatown's doorstep." Mobs threatened the peace of the city, and on July 26, Bryant was compelled to call upon the Army and upon organized gangs of vigilantes to help restore order.

Bryant's response was called a "debacle" in that he "refused to use city government to do anything to ameliorate economic conditions, citing both lack of authority and lack of money," But he and the supervisors "cooperated to suppress the workingmen's protests and their party," the Workingman's Party of California.

In 1878, Bryant called together and was elected chairman of a relief committee designed to accept and forward donations to Southern United States communities that were then in the grip of a yellow fever epidemic.

Bryant was caught up in a scandal over the widening of Dupont Street in Chinatown when it was claimed that he had bought property along the street for which he would have been recompensed as a result of the widening. An April 1879 lawsuit by W.M. Lent, C.F. Fargo and others claimed that Bryant "was not a disinterested Commissioner in the matter . . . but was, in fact, acting in all said matters as a judge in his own case."

The famous detective Harry N. Morse investigated the Dupont Street frauds and exposed Bryant's corruption, as detailed in John Boessenecker's book Lawman: The Life and Times of Harry Morse.

The mayor hosted former President Ulysses S. Grant when the general made a lengthy visit to California after his around-the world trip in 1879. Grant went for a ride in Golden Gate Park with Bryant in September and dined at his house in October.

=== State ===
Bryant's name was placed in nomination for California governor at a Democratic state convention, but he withdrew it after the third ballot.

== Post-mayoralty ==
Bryant was the defendant in a July 1885 criminal complaint filed by G. W. O'Donnell, the son of Coroner C. C. O'Donnell, in which the younger O'Donnell claimed he had heard Bryant threaten the life of the coroner. Bryant testified he passed near the morgue and "happened to see the body of a woman partially uncovered and exposed to the gaze of the passers-by" and exclaimed, "Anybody who would run a morgue that way ought to have every bone in his body broken, and I will break them for him." A judge found Bryant innocent of the charge.

Bryant was chairman of a committee charged with erecting a monument to General Grant in Golden Gate Park.

He was also chairman of an 1887 committee "to make preparations for an extensive and proper exhibit of interior products at the fair to be given this fall by the Mechanics' Institute." Other officers were W.T. Garrett, vice president, and William T. Stout, secretary.

== Death ==
Bryant died on May 11, 1888, after he fell off a ferryboat in the San Francisco Bay bound for Oakland. At first, it was thought that the former mayor might have died by suicide, and three full columns in the San Francisco Chronicle were devoted to that theory:

The first conjecture was that the manner of the tragic death of the well-known citizen was the evidence of suicide. Subsequent developments only helped strengthen the opinion and remove all doubt that the untimely termination of the ex-Mayor's career was the act of a desperate man, goaded by financial and physical troubles.

The New York Times reported that:

A.J. Bryant, ex-Mayor of San Francisco, committed suicide this morning by jumping from the ferry steamer Encinal just after the boat had started on the 9:15 trip to Oakland. Mr. Bryant was very nervous and trembling when he bought his ticket, and the gate-keeper appears to be the last man who talked with him.

A coroner's jury, however, ruled on May 15, 1888, that the death was accidental, a decision based primarily on the testimony of "the boy Joseph Leikena," who said:

When the boat was three or four blocks out from the wharf, I saw a man walking up and down on the upper deck. He was the only person I saw there. He walked close to the railing, staggered and fell overboard, and when he struck the water he struggled as though trying to swim. He went over the side of the vessel at the stern and did not jump overboard.

== Family ==
Bryant was married twice, having six children by his first wife, his oldest daughter later becoming the wife of Mayor William Russell Grace of New York City. His second marriage was in 1870. In 1877 another daughter, Mary J., married George Avery.

== Memberships ==
Although Bryant was a Democrat, during the Civil War in the United States, he aligned with the Republican Party, and in 1871 he helped organize and was presiding officer of the [David C.] Broderick Union Republican Club of the State of California, named in honor of the California State Senator who was killed in a duel with California Chief Justice David S. Terry. The founding resolution noted that Broderick had sought to form an organization "whose main principle was opposition to the extension of slavery."

The next year, 1872, Bryant was active in beginning a California branch of the Liberal Republican movement, or Central Greeley Club, that would support Horace Greeley for president instead of Ulysses S. Grant.

By 1873, Bryant was president of the Pacific Jockey Club, which presented horse races at a track in the city.

He was president of the Occidental Lodge, Free and Accepted Masons, and was a trustee of Mills College in Oakland. In 1875, he helped organize the Underwriters' Fire Patrol of San Francisco, whose object was "to discover and prevent fires and save property from conflagration."

Bryant was one of the organizers of the California Society for the Prevention of Cruelty to Children in 1876.
