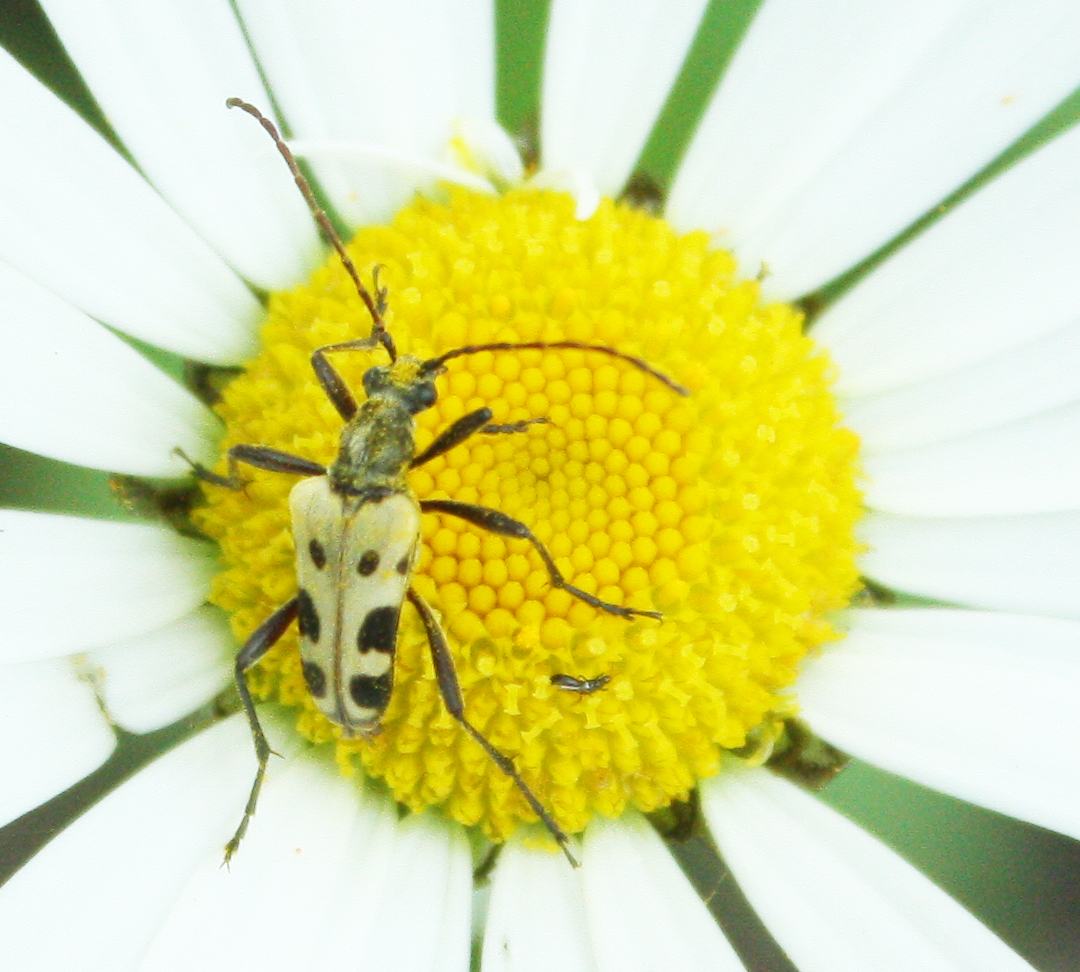

Scientific classification
- Kingdom: Animalia
- Phylum: Arthropoda
- Class: Insecta
- Order: Coleoptera
- Suborder: Polyphaga
- Infraorder: Cucujiformia
- Family: Cerambycidae
- Genus: Evodinus
- Species: E. monticola

Binomial name
- Evodinus monticola (J.W. Randall, 1838)

= Evodinus monticola =

Species of beetle

Evodinus monticola is a species of the Lepturinae subfamily in the long-horned beetle family. This beetle is distributed in Canada, and United States.

== Subtaxa ==
There are two subspecies in species:

- Evodinus monticola monticola (Randall, 1838)
- Evodinus monticola vancouveri Casey, 1913
