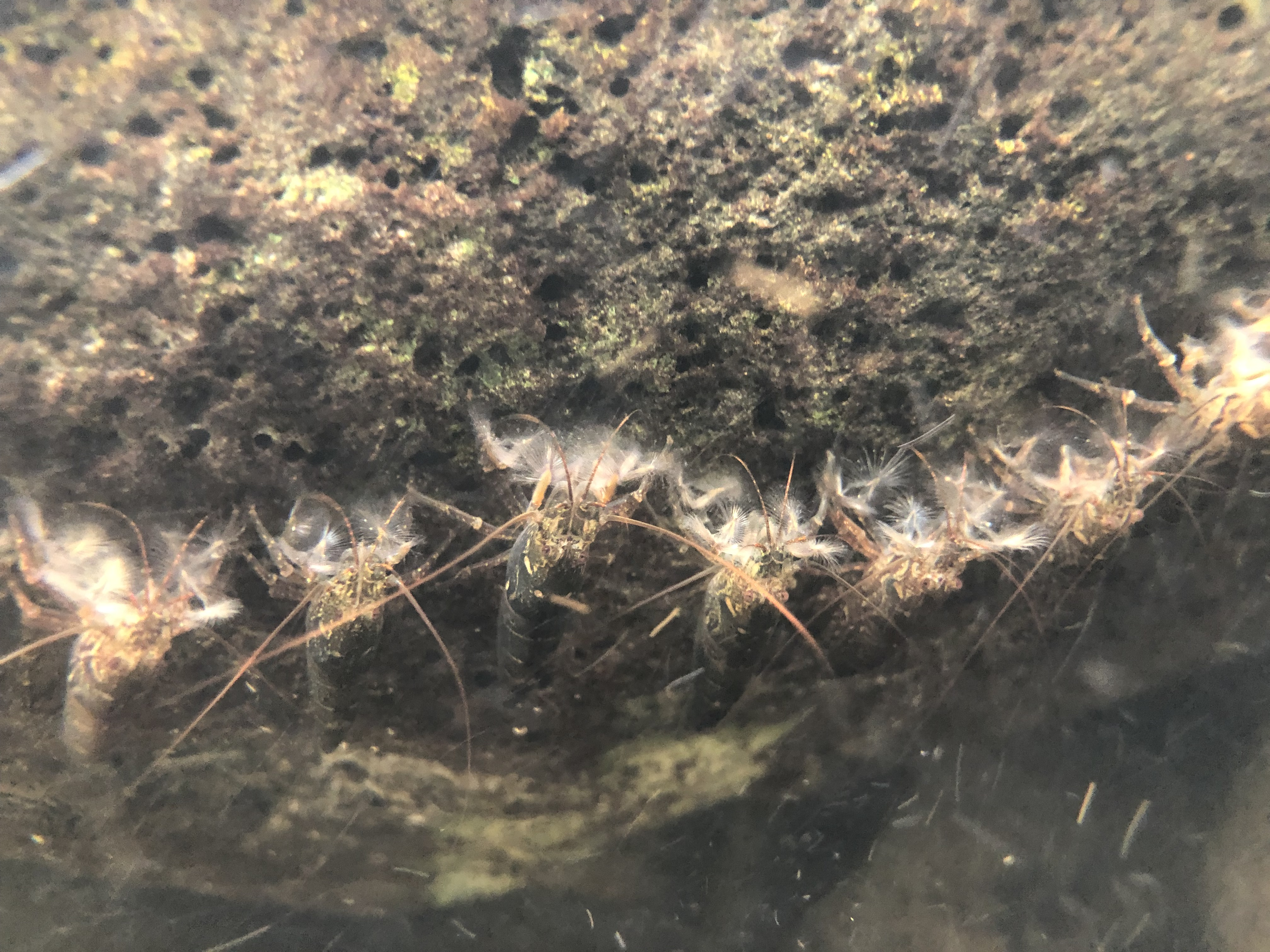

Scientific classification
- Domain: Eukaryota
- Kingdom: Animalia
- Phylum: Arthropoda
- Class: Malacostraca
- Order: Decapoda
- Suborder: Pleocyemata
- Infraorder: Caridea
- Family: Atyidae
- Genus: Atyoida
- Species: A. bisulcata

Binomial name
- Atyoida bisulcata J. W. Randall, 1840

Synonyms
- Ortmannia henshawi Rathbun, 1901

= Atyoida bisulcata =

Species of freshwater shrimp

Atyoida bisulcata, also called ʻŌpae kalaʻole or ʻŌpae kuahiwi in Hawaiian, is a species of freshwater shrimp endemic to Hawaiʻi in the family Atyidae. It was described in 1840 by John Witt Randall and is the type species for the genus Atyoida.

== Description ==
This species of freshwater shrimp grow to about 2 inches in length. They don't possess any type of claws but have a unique set of pincers, containing bristle-like hairs that are primarily used to catch and filter small food particles from water columns. The shrimp are often characterized by either a golden-brown or dark-green/black pigmentation.

== Distribution & habitat ==
‘Ōpae kala‘ole can be commonly found on the islands of Kaua‘i, O‘ahu, Moloka‘i, Maui, and Hawai‘i, where they occupy streams of high water quality. They often inhabit the higher parts of streams, where the water is typically flowing the quickest. Oftentimes, they can be seen upstream of 100 ft waterfalls.

== Human use & cultural significance ==
As of today, the consumption of the shrimp continues and is still considered a prized source of food. They were regarded as a favorite delicacy consumed by the early Native Hawaiians. However, the sale of the shrimp is illegal while its consumption is not.
