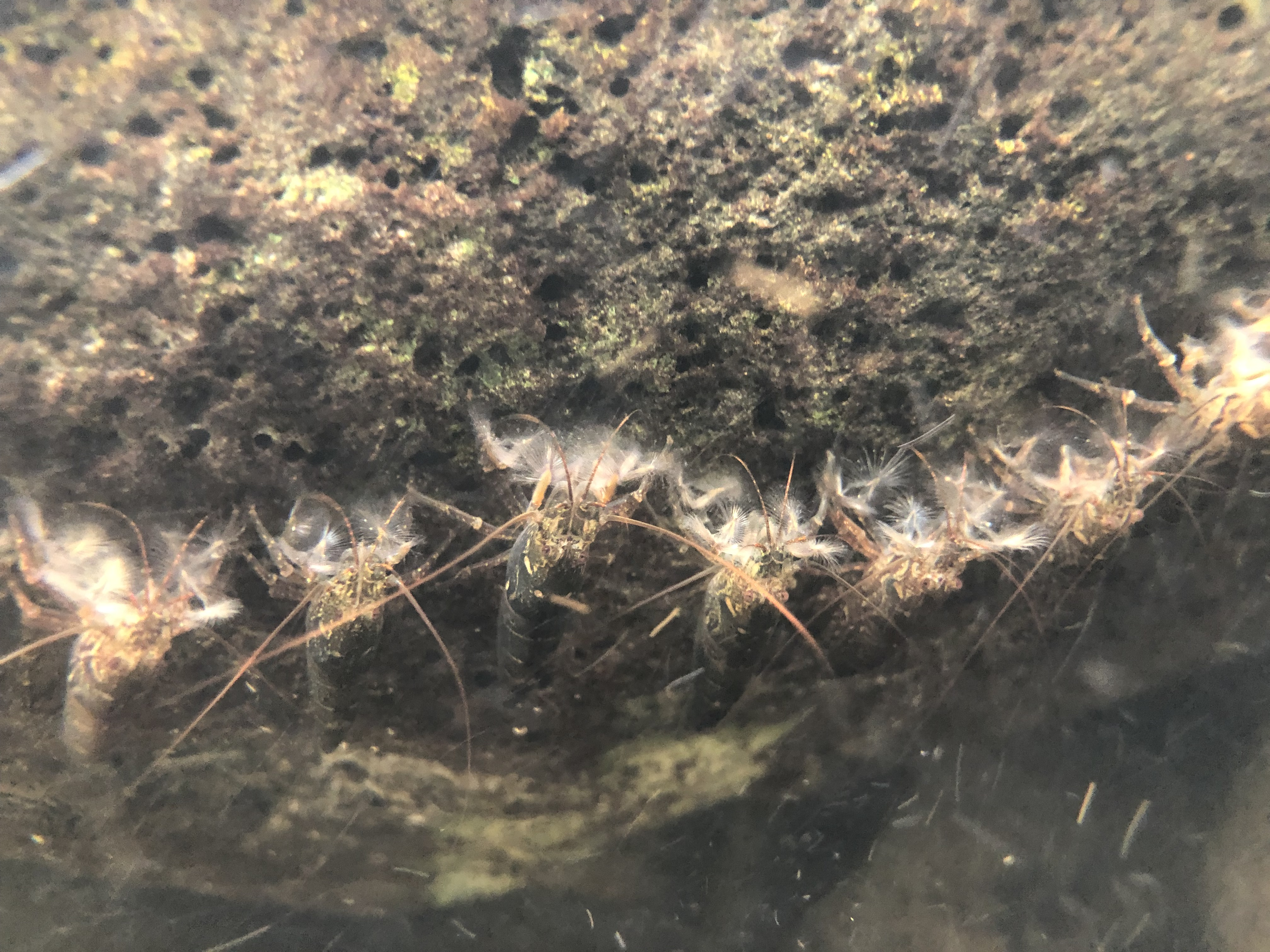
- A. bisulcata

Scientific classification
- Kingdom: Animalia
- Phylum: Arthropoda
- Clade: Pancrustacea
- Class: Malacostraca
- Order: Decapoda
- Suborder: Pleocyemata
- Infraorder: Caridea
- Family: Atyidae
- Genus: Atyoida; J. W. Randall, 1840

Synonyms
- Ortmannia Rathbun, 1901; Pseudatya Roux, 1928; Vanderbiltia Boone, 1935

= Atyoida =

Genus of crustaceans

Atyoida is a genus of freshwater shrimp in the family Atyidae. There are five species in the genus, each endemic to a different Pacific island group. The type species, Atyoida bisulcata, is endemic to Hawaiʻi and described by John Witt Randall in 1840.

== Species ==
There are currently five valid species:

- Atyoida bisulcata Randall, 1840
- Atyoida chacei de Mazancourt, Marquet & Keith, 2024
- Atyoida pilipes (Newport, 1847)
- Atyoida serrata (Spence Bate, 1888)
- Atyoida tahitensis Stimpson, 1860
