= Anna Maria Wells =

American writer (1795–1868)

Anna Maria Wells (née Foster; 1795–1868) was a 19th-century poet and a writer of children’s literature. The poet and editor Sarah Josepha Hale wrote that Wells, as a child, had a "passionate love of reading and music," and began to write verses when very young. In 1830, Wells published Poems and Juvenile Sketches, a compilation of her early work, after which she contributed occasionally to various periodicals. Hale opined that "the predominant characteristics of [Wells'] poetry were tenderness of feeling, and simplicity and perspicuity of language." Wells' contemporaries, in addition to Sarah Hale, were Caroline Howard Gilman, Hannah Flagg Gould, Eliza Leslie, Catharine Maria Sedgwick, and Lydia Huntley Sigourney.

== Early years ==
Anna Maria Wells was born in Gloucester, Massachusetts in 1795 and was baptized there (as Anna Mary Foster) on September 20, 1795. She was the daughter of Captain Benjamin Foster (1769–1795) and his wife, Mary "Polly" Ingersoll (1770–1849). Her father, captain of the brigantine Polly from 1791 until 1794, died between June and September 1795 when she was an infant.

Wells' brother, William Vincent Foster (born in 1790), died on April 21, 1817 "on the Coast of Africa." At the time, he was the "master of the John Willis, schooner of Boston...trading with the Natives for ivory."

On October 18, 1800, her widowed mother married Joseph Locke (1767–1838), a Boston merchant and fish dealer, whose first wife had been Mary's sister Martha. After their marriage, Joseph and Mary Locke lived at Boston and Hingham, where they had seven children, among them the poet Frances Sargent Osgood.

According to an obituary notice, written in 1868:

[Anna Maria Wells] was born at Gloucester, Massachusetts, and receiving a thorough education, especially in the department of fine arts, became celebrated even in early youth as a painter in water colors, as a musician and poet. In 1824, she won the Handel and Haydn prize — a large and beautiful diamond cross — for the poem delivered at that society's inauguration. Her success was the more noteworthy, as there were many competitors, some of whom had gained a national reputation.

== Career and family ==
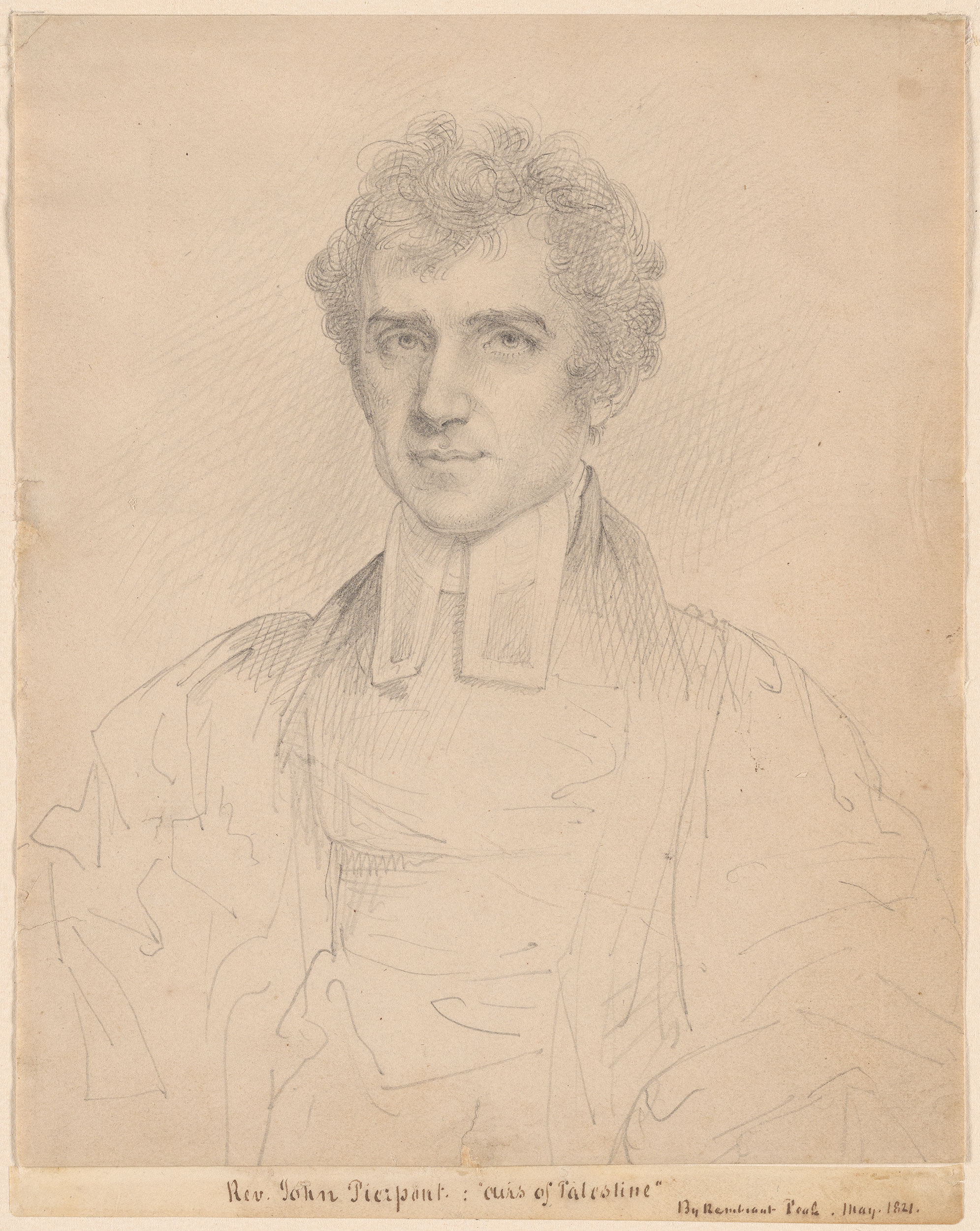
Rev. John Pierpont, drawn by Rembrandt Peale in 1821, the year Pierpont married Anna Maria Foster and Thomas Wells.

Anna Maria Foster and Thomas Wells (1790–1861) were married at the Hollis Street Church in Boston on August 6, 1821, by Rev. John Pierpont, a poet, lawyer, temperance advocate, and Unitarian minister. Thomas Wells was the son of Capt. Thomas Wells, (vintner on Ann Street, "four doors north of the drawbridge"), and a grandson of the Revolutionary War patriot Samuel Adams. He dabbled in poetry while earning his living (from about 1820 to 1828) as an inspector for the U.S. Customs Office in Boston. In 1825, he read his poem, Ye Shades of Martyred Heroes, to a crowd of thousands gathered to commemorate the 50th anniversary of the Battle of Bunker Hill, and in 1826, the Boston News-letter announced, "The prize poem delivered at the Hubbard Gallery, was a good thing, written by a good poet, who has taken many good premiums before this for his good midnight lucubrations — Mr. Thomas Wells, as well as his lady, are beautiful writers who never fail of being [number one], when writing for a medal." Several of his poems appeared in Kettel's 1829 Specimens of American Poetry.

Between 1822 and 1828, Anna Wells bore four children, the first of whom was Thomas Foster Wells (1822–1903), a shipping merchant, raiser of shipwrecks, and father of the mathematician Webster Wells and the architect Joseph Morrill Wells. Her third son, William Vincent Wells (1826–1876), wrote a three-volume biography of his ancestor, The Life and Public Services of Samuel Adams, first published in 1865. In 1830, Anna Wells published Poems and Juvenile Sketches, the compilation for which she is best known. The Atlantic Monthly Magazine praised it, writing: "The purest and best poetry for children is written by Mrs. Anna Maria Wells, whose new book lies by us at this moment. We have always been an admirer of the chastened, unaffected, natural vein of this lady's genius...and it is pleasant to know that her delightful book sells rapidly."

In 1834, Thomas Wells left his wife and children and joined the Navy as schoolmaster aboard the frigate USS Potomac and later aboard the frigate USS John Adams. From December 1836 until July 1838, he served aboard the USS Constitution as private secretary to Commodore Jesse Elliott, Commander of the Navy's Mediterranean Squadron, during which time he wrote Letters on Palestine, a chronicle of his side-trips to the Holy Land while stationed in the Middle East. In a biographical sketch of Anna Maria Wells, written in 1837 after Thomas Wells had left Boston, Sarah Josepha Hale wrote that while Wells "was a man of considerable literary talent and taste...unfortunately for his family, he had small inclination for business, and great love for the luxuries of life." According to Hale, the support and education of Anna Wells' four children "was imposed upon her" and that "she found her talent for music the most available for her purpose." The historian Sidney Perley suggested that she earned her living as an educator, writing in an 1889 sketch that "Mrs. Wells' chief attention was given to her school for young ladies." She lived in South Carolina during at least part of the couple's separation, and may have been living there in 1837, when the Charleston-based Southern Literary Journal published her ironical short story, Auto-biography of Amelia Sophia Smink.

Thomas Wells' employment by Commodore Elliott caused him to become the central witness in Elliott's court martial trial in 1840. Numerous witnesses were summoned to testify as to Wells' truthfulness, or lack thereof. Among them was Rev. John Pierpont, who testified (answering more than he was asked): "I am a clergyman residing in the city of Boston...I know Mr. Thomas Wells...I officiated at his second marriage, and am quite intimate with the family into which he married...his intemperance is the only point, from any one living, that I ever heard his character called in question; I once heard a person who is now dead speak to the prejudice of his character in another respect; but that person himself did not enjoy the best reputation for truth and veracity...that man questioned his conjugal fidelity...I never heard Mr. Wells's character for truth and veracity questioned by any person whatever; I would believe him as a witness, under oath."

The couple reunited in the late 1830s and had two short-lived children: Joseph Locke Wells (1840–1840) and Mary Ingersoll Wells (1843–1845). In 1842, the New York Herald announced that Edgar Marchant would publish a new Boston daily newspaper, the Daily Circular, "edited by Thomas Welles [sic], Esq., assisted by his talented lady, Mrs. Anna Maria Welles, so well known as a valuable contributor to the periodical literature of our country. Mr. Welles is a man of extensive acquirements, possesses an excellent taste and judgment, and has had the advantage of much travel. Under such management, and with the assistance obtained, the Daily Circular can hardly fail of success, notwithstanding the multiplicity of papers within the last year or two." The newspaper venture seems to have gone nowhere, and by the time of the 1850 census, Anna Wells was living in New York City with her daughter, Anna Wells Whelpley (1828–1860), the wife of Dr. James Davenport Whelpley (1817–1872), physician, philosopher, metallurgist, and editor and part-owner of the American Whig Review. (At the time of the 1855 Massachusetts, the 1860 Federal, and the 1865 Massachusetts censuses, Anna Maria Wells lived in Boston with her son Thomas Foster Wells.)

== Death ==
Thomas Wells died at Boston on December 11, 1861. Anna Maria Wells died at her home on Centre Street in Roxbury Highlands, Massachusetts, on December 19, 1868. In spite of their having lived apart for many years, they are buried together in Forest Hills Cemetery at Jamaica Plain, Massachusetts.

== Legacy ==
After her death, Anna Maria Wells's cousin, the writer Epes Sargent, published an obituary notice, summarizing her achievements:

In Roxbury, the 19th inst., died Anna Maria Wells, at the age of seventy-three. In the days when our native poets were rarer than now, Mrs. Wells and her husband, the late Thomas Wells (a grandson of Samuel Adams) were quite distinguished in Boston for their writings in verse, which were always marked by good taste and touches of genuine power. Of late years Mrs. Wells had written for children mostly. Some of the best of the poems in that successful little venture, The Nursery, a monthly magazine for children, have been from her pen. She was also a frequent contributor to Our Young Folks. She was a lady of fine literary judgement, and her conversational powers were such as to make her always welcome in society.

== Bibliography ==
=== Writing by Anna Maria Wells ===
- Poems and Juvenile Sketches (Boston: Carter, Hendee & Babcock, 1830).
- "Auto-biography of Amelia Sophia Smink," in The Southern Literary Journal, Vol. 1, No. 6 (August 1837), pp. 501–508.
- "Sketches from Buncombe, N.C.," in The Poetry of Traveling in the United States (New York: S.Colman, 1838), pp. 269–283.
- The Flowerlet. A Gift of Love (Boston: William Crosby & Co., 1842).
- Patty Williams's Voyage. A Story Almost Wholly True (Boston: Walker, Fuller & Co., 1866).
- "The Future," in The Female Poets of America (Philadelphia: E.H. Butler & Co., 1867).
- "Mary's First Trial," in Our Young Folks, Vol. 4, No. 11 (November 1868), pp. 657–660.
- "Compensation," in Overland Monthly, Vol. 1, No. 6 (December 1868), p. 524.

=== Writing about Anna Maria Wells ===
- Bert Roller, "Early American writers for children: Anna Maria Wells," in The Elementary English Review, Vol. 10, No. 5 (May 1933) pp. 119–120, 134.

== See also ==
- Joseph Morrill Wells, architect, Thomas and Anna Maria Wells's grandson
- Webster Wells, mathematician, Thomas and Anna Maria Wells's grandson
- Annie Renouf-Whelpley, artist and composer, Anna Maria Wells’s granddaughter
- Frances Sargent Osgood, poet, Anna Maria Wells's sister
- John Witt Randall, art collector and poet, Thomas Wells's nephew
