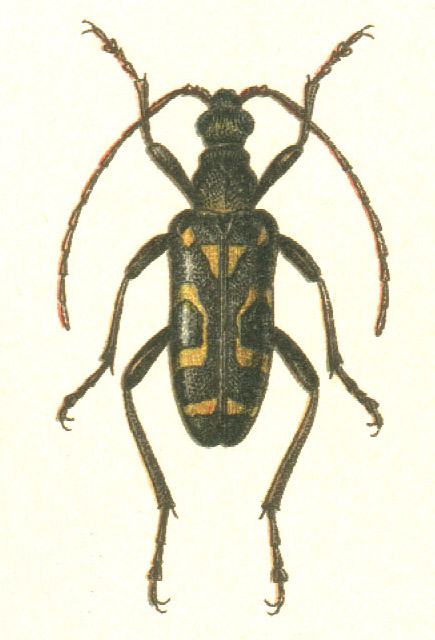

Scientific classification
- Kingdom: Animalia
- Phylum: Arthropoda
- Class: Insecta
- Order: Coleoptera
- Suborder: Polyphaga
- Infraorder: Cucujiformia
- Family: Cerambycidae
- Genus: Evodinus
- Species: E. borealis

Binomial name
- Evodinus borealis (Gyllenhaal, 1827)

Synonyms
- Evodinellus borealis (Gyllenhal, 1827); Evodinellus grisescens Pic, 1889; Leptura borealis Gyllenhal, 1827; Pidonia grisescens Pic, 1890

= Evodinus borealis =

Species of beetle

Evodinus borealis is a species of the Lepturinae subfamily in the long-horned beetle family. This beetle is ranged from Atlantic coasts through Eurasian continent to Pacific coasts.

== Subtaxa ==
There are two varietets in species:

- Evodinus borealis var. fulvipennis Plavilstshikov
- Evodinus borealis var. obscurissimus Pic
