= Evodinus lanhami =

Scientific classification
- Kingdom: Animalia
- Phylum: Arthropoda
- Class: Insecta
- Order: Coleoptera
- Suborder: Polyphaga
- Infraorder: Cucujiformia
- Family: Cerambycidae
- Genus: Evodinus
- Species: E. lanhami

Binomial name
- Evodinus lanhami Lewis, 1976

Species of beetle

Evodinus lanhami is a species of beetle in the family Cerambycidae. It was described by Lewis in 1976.
