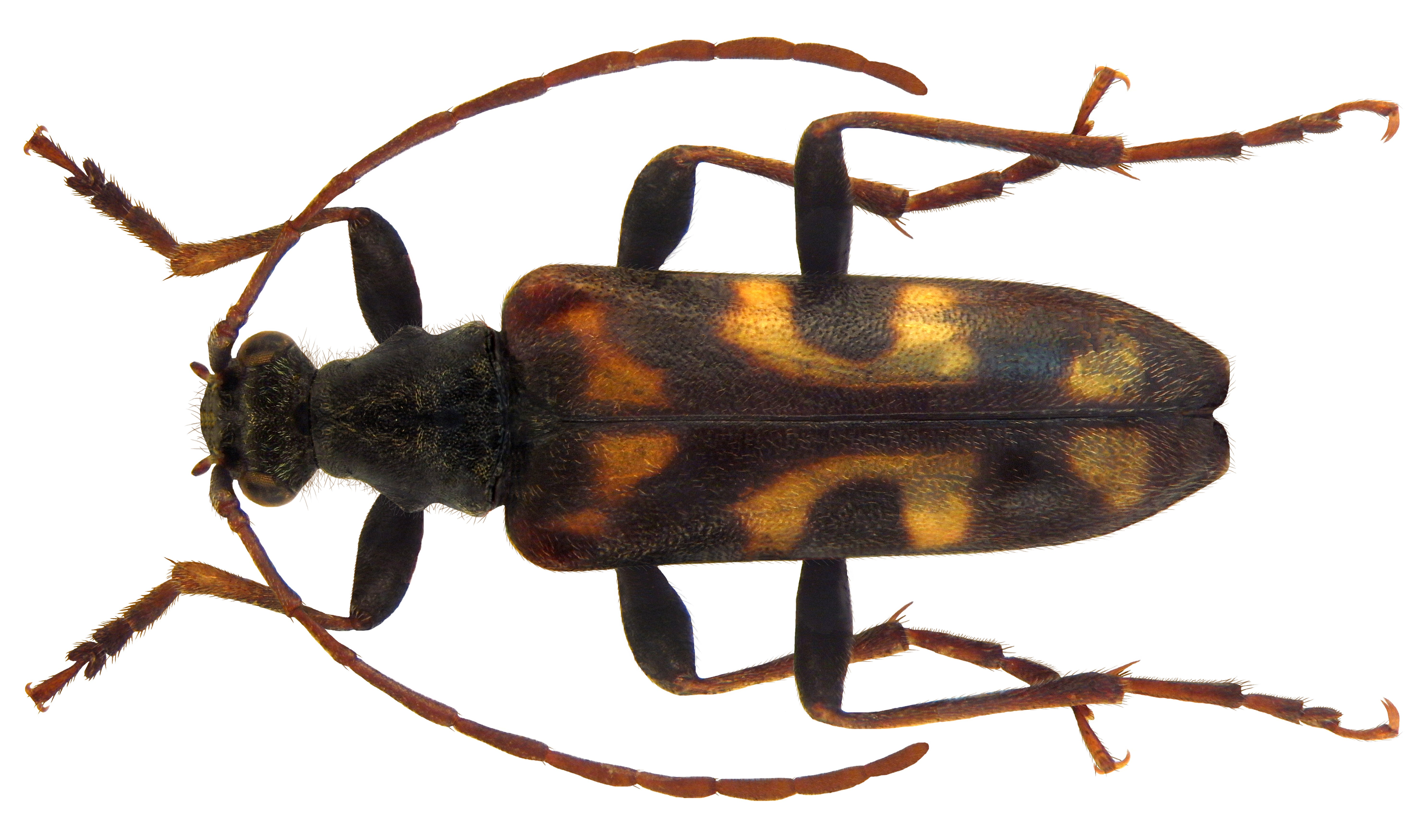
- Evodinus borealis

Scientific classification
- Kingdom: Animalia
- Phylum: Arthropoda
- Class: Insecta
- Order: Coleoptera
- Suborder: Polyphaga
- Infraorder: Cucujiformia
- Family: Cerambycidae
- Subfamily: Lepturinae
- Tribe: Rhagiini
- Genus: Evodinus; LeConte, 1850

= Evodinus =

Genus of beetles

Evodinus is a genus of beetles in the family Cerambycidae, containing the following species:

- Evodinus borealis (Gyllenhal, 1827)
- Evodinus clathratus (Fabricius, 1793)
- Evodinus lanhami Lewis, 1976
- Evodinus monticola (Randall, 1838)
