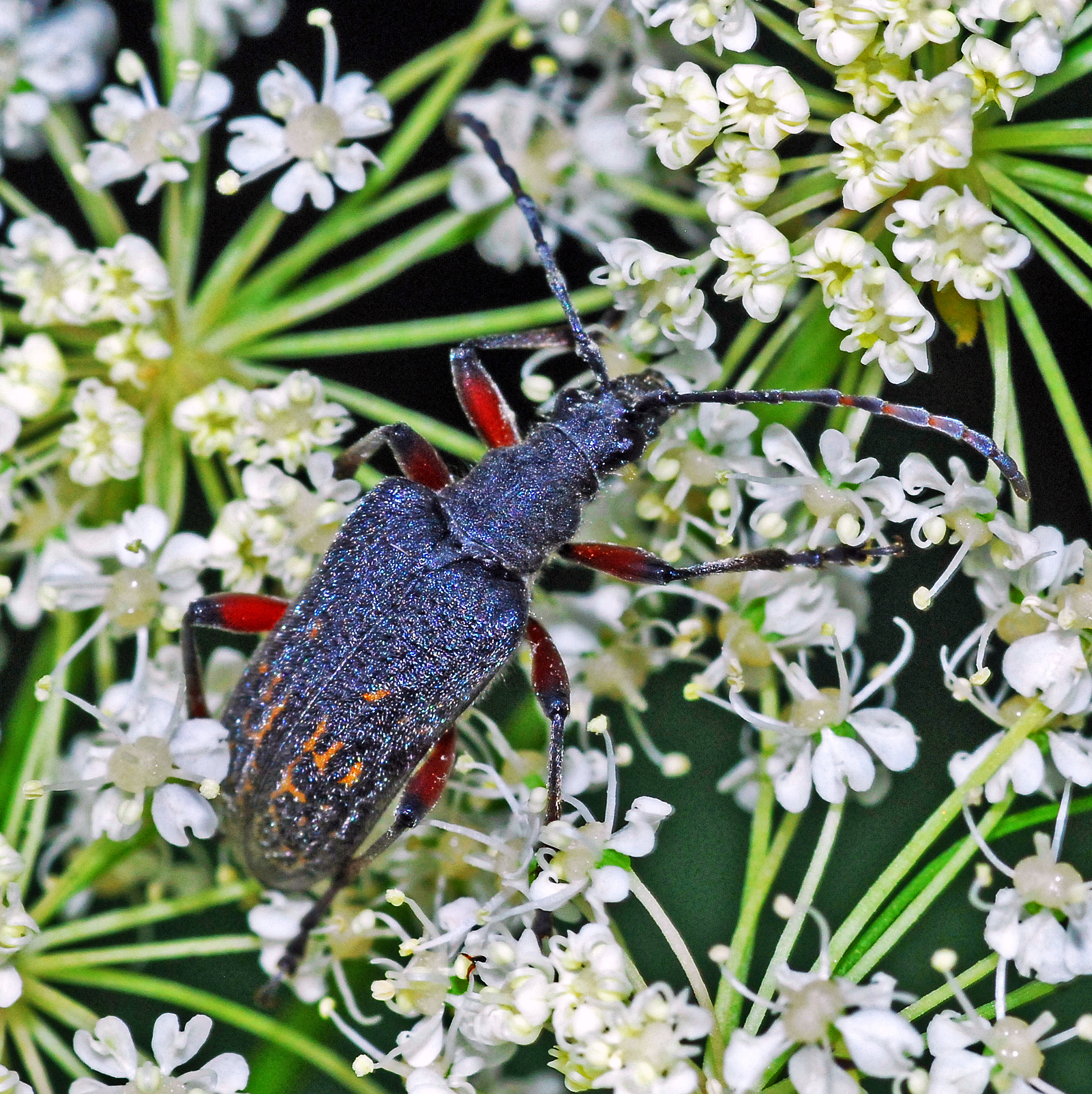

Scientific classification
- Kingdom: Animalia
- Phylum: Arthropoda
- Clade: Pancrustacea
- Class: Insecta
- Order: Coleoptera
- Suborder: Polyphaga
- Infraorder: Cucujiformia
- Family: Cerambycidae
- Genus: Evodinus
- Species: E. clathratus

Binomial name
- Evodinus clathratus (Fabricius, 1793)

Synonyms
- List: Rhagium clathratum Fabricius, 1793; Evodinellus clathratus (Fabricius, 1793); Pachyta clathrata (Fabricius, 1793); Brachyta clathrata (Fabricius, 1793); Leptura signata Panzer, 1793 nec Geoffroy, 1785

= Evodinus clathratus =

Species of beetle

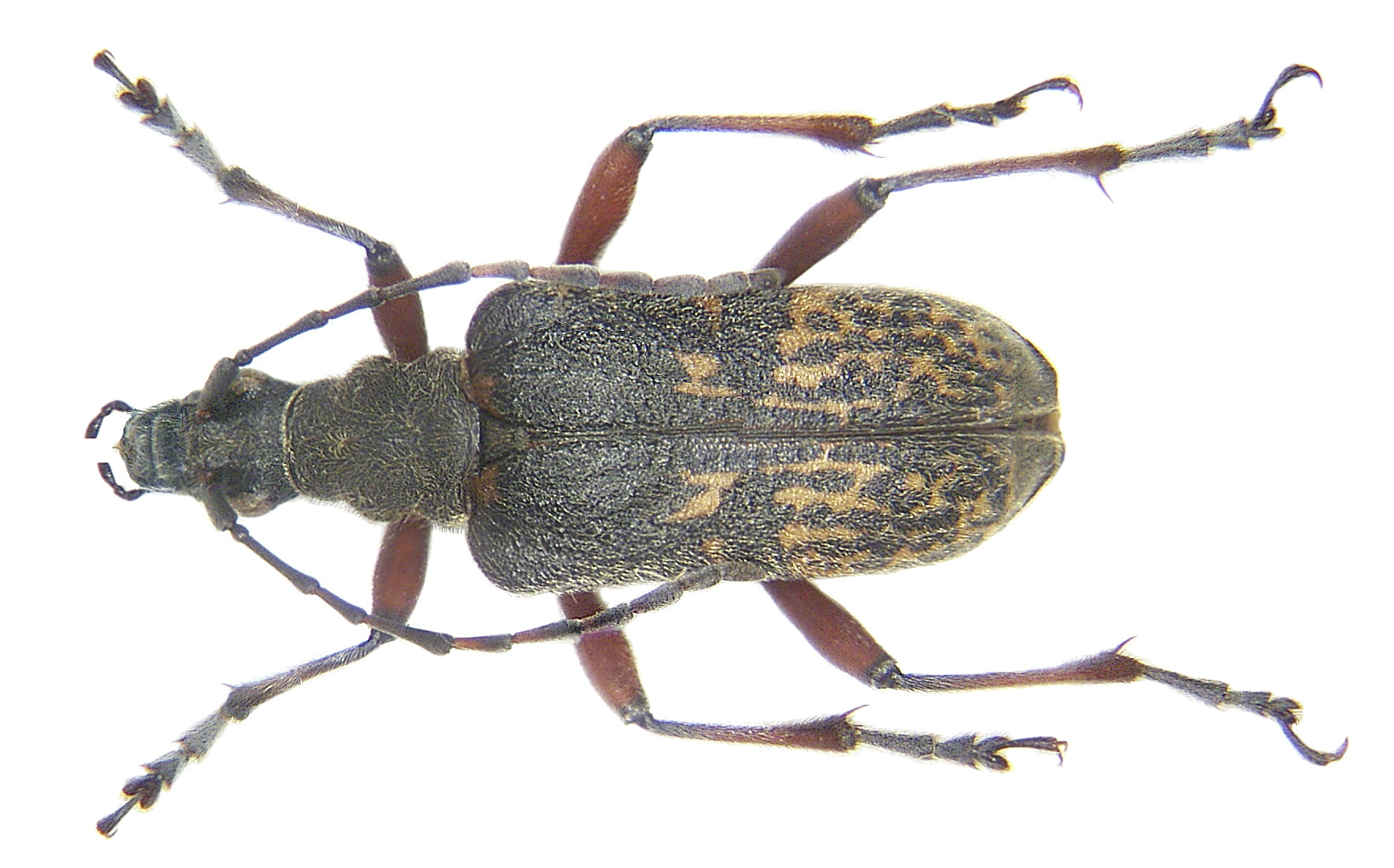
Mounted specimen

Evodinus clathratus is a species of beetle in the family Cerambycidae.

== Distribution and habitat ==
This species is present in most of Europe and in Russia. Evodinus clathratus is a typical mountain species, widespread in the Alps, at an elevation up to 1,400 metres (4,600 ft) above sea level.

== Description ==
Evodinus clathratus can reach a body length of about 9–13 mm (0.35–0.51 in). These beetles have a narrow black head. The black pronotum is narrow, rough and strongly punctuated. The elytra are black with reddish yellowish dots on the base. The legs are typically partially reddish, though it is an extremely variable species in terms of markings on the elytra and in coloring of the legs.

== Biology ==
The life cycle of these beetles is two to three years. Adults can be found from May to July. They frequently feed on nectar of Aruncus vulgaris. The larvae are polyphagous in coniferous trees. They develop in decayed branches and trunks of spruce (especially Picea abies), beech, willow, and alder.
