= George Hewston =

16th Mayor of San Francisco during 1875

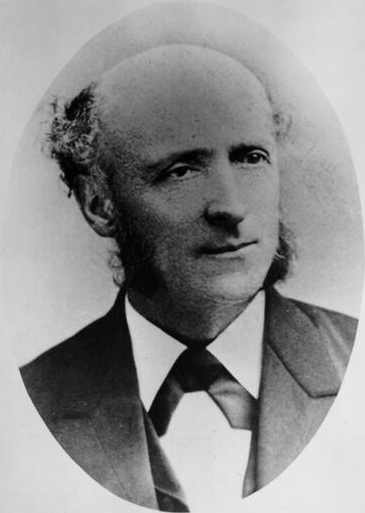

16th Mayor of San Francisco
- In office November 4, 1875 – December 5, 1875
- Preceded by: James Otis
- Succeeded by: Andrew Jackson Bryant

San Francisco Board of Supervisors
- In office 1873–1875

Personal details
- Born: September 11, 1826 Philadelphia, Pennsylvania, U.S.
- Died: September 4, 1891 (aged 64) San Francisco, California, U.S.
- Occupation: Politician, educator, medical doctor

George Hewston (September 11, 1826 – September 4, 1891) was an American politician, educator, and physician. He was appointed the 16th Mayor of San Francisco upon the death of James Otis. He was sworn in on November 4, 1875, and served until December 5, 1875.

== Biography ==
Hewston was born on September 11, 1826, in Philadelphia, Pennsylvania. He apprenticed himself to a physician and then took a medical degree from the Philadelphia College of Medicine and the University of Pennsylvania.

He moved with his family to San Francisco to escape the American Civil War. Hewston established a new medical practice upon his arrival, supplementing his income by lecturing at the Toland College of Medicine (later known as University of California, San Francisco).

His skill at lecturing brought him to the attention of the People's Party, which nominated him for San Francisco Board of Supervisors in 1873. He was appointed mayor to finish James Otis's unfinished term several days after his death. During his brief term, Hewston sat in on an investigation into charges against six policemen. He also refused to make inflated payments for unspecified repairs. He was known for making a speech condemning the Chinese for bringing opium into the city.

After his term, he served on the commission to plan California's celebration of America's centennial. His final political activity was as chair of the Anti-Monopoly Party, which sought to stop the transfer of federal lands for the railroads. Hewston then returned to the lecture circuit and travelled along the East Coast, collecting many books along the way. He eventually amassed some 2000 volumes for his private library.

He died on September 4, 1891, in San Francisco of Bright's disease. He was interred at Masonic Cemetery in San Francisco, and when that closed around 1940 he was reinterred at Woodland Cemetery in Colma, California.
