= Frederick A. Wells =

American politician

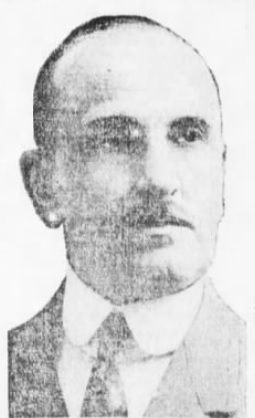
Frederick A. Wells (1914)

Frederick Adams Wells (October 13, 1857 – March 12, 1926) was an American businessman and politician from New York.

== Personal life ==
Wells was born in Brooklyn, Kings County, New York on October 13, 1857, the son of James Wells (1828–1888), a federal revenue assessor, and his wife, Althea Maria Gantz (ca 1837–1914). Samuel Adams, a signer of the Declaration of Independence, was a great-great-grandfather. Wells was educated in the public and private schools of Brooklyn.

Frederick Wells married (1st) in 1884 Ada Cynthia Gallagher (1862–1896), with whom he had a son, William Henson Wells (1886–1958). He married (2nd) in 1902 Ida Von Hofe.

In 1899, Wells was "president and treasurer of the Frederick A. Wells Co., manufacturers". In 1916, he was "engaged in the importing business". In 1920 he was employed as a cigar salesman.

Wells died on March 12, 1926, in St. Petersburg, Florida, and was buried at the Green-Wood Cemetery in Brooklyn.

== Military and political career ==
Wells was active in the New York State Militia, achieving the rank of major of the U.S. Army, but resigned his commission in 1916 in order to be eligible for election to state office.

Running as a member of the Republican Party, Wells won election to the New York State Assembly (Kings County, 17th District) in 1915, 1916, 1917, 1918, 1919, 1920, 1921 and 1922. He was Chairman of the Committee on Military Affairs from 1918 to 1922. Wells was defeated in the elections of 1922 and 23 by Julius Ruger, a Democrat.

== See also ==
- John Witt Randall, art collector, Frederick Wells’ first cousin once removed.
- Webster Wells, mathematician, Frederick Wells’ second cousin.
- Joseph Morrill Wells, architect, Frederick Wells’ second cousin.

New York State Assembly
Preceded by Alvah W. Burlingame Jr.	New York State Assembly; Kings County, 17th District; 1915–1922	Succeeded by Julius Ruger
