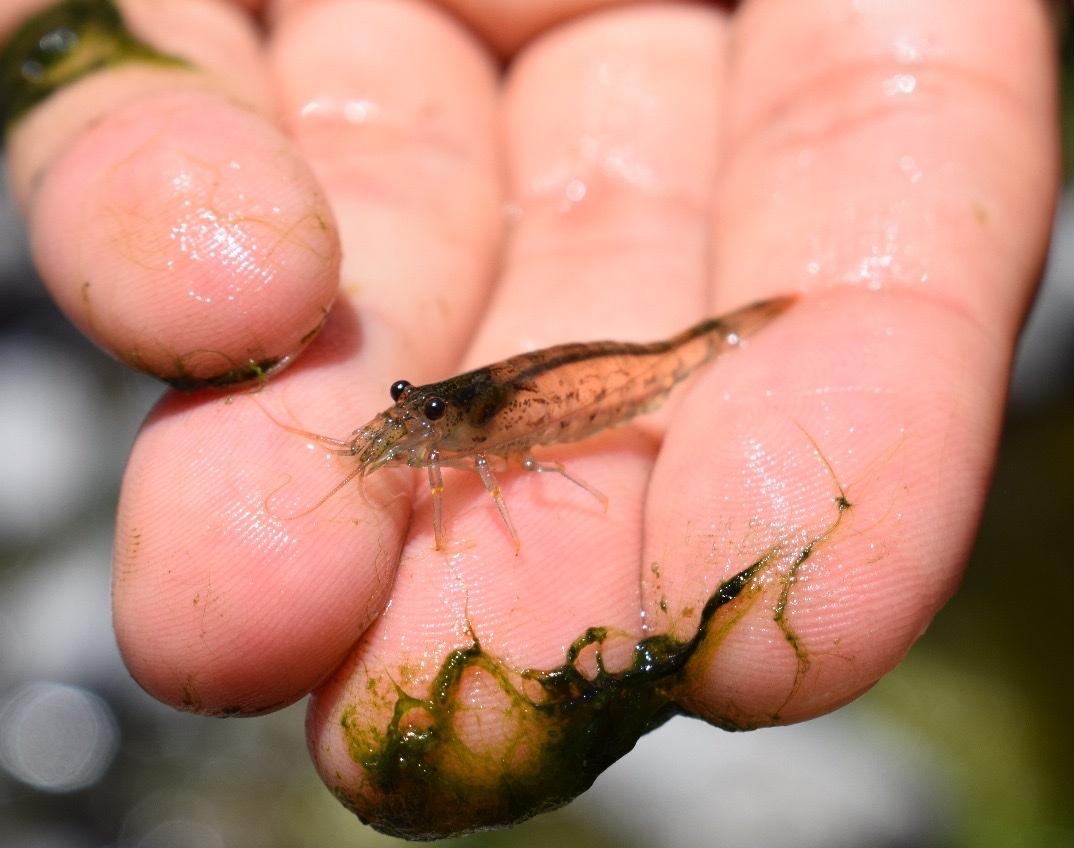
- A specimen from Réunion

Conservation status
- Least Concern (IUCN 3.1)

Scientific classification
- Kingdom: Animalia
- Phylum: Arthropoda
- Clade: Pancrustacea
- Class: Malacostraca
- Order: Decapoda
- Suborder: Pleocyemata
- Infraorder: Caridea
- Family: Atyidae
- Genus: Atyoida
- Species: A. serrata

Binomial name
- Atyoida serrata Spence Bate, 1888

= Atyoida serrata =

Species of shrimp

Atyoida serrata is a species of freshwater shrimp of the family Atyidae and genus Atyoida. The species lives in the Vungu, Umgeni, and Mtamvuna rivers in South Africa, as well as the Langevin River on Réunion Island.
