= William Alvord =

13th Mayor of San Francisco from 1871 to 1873

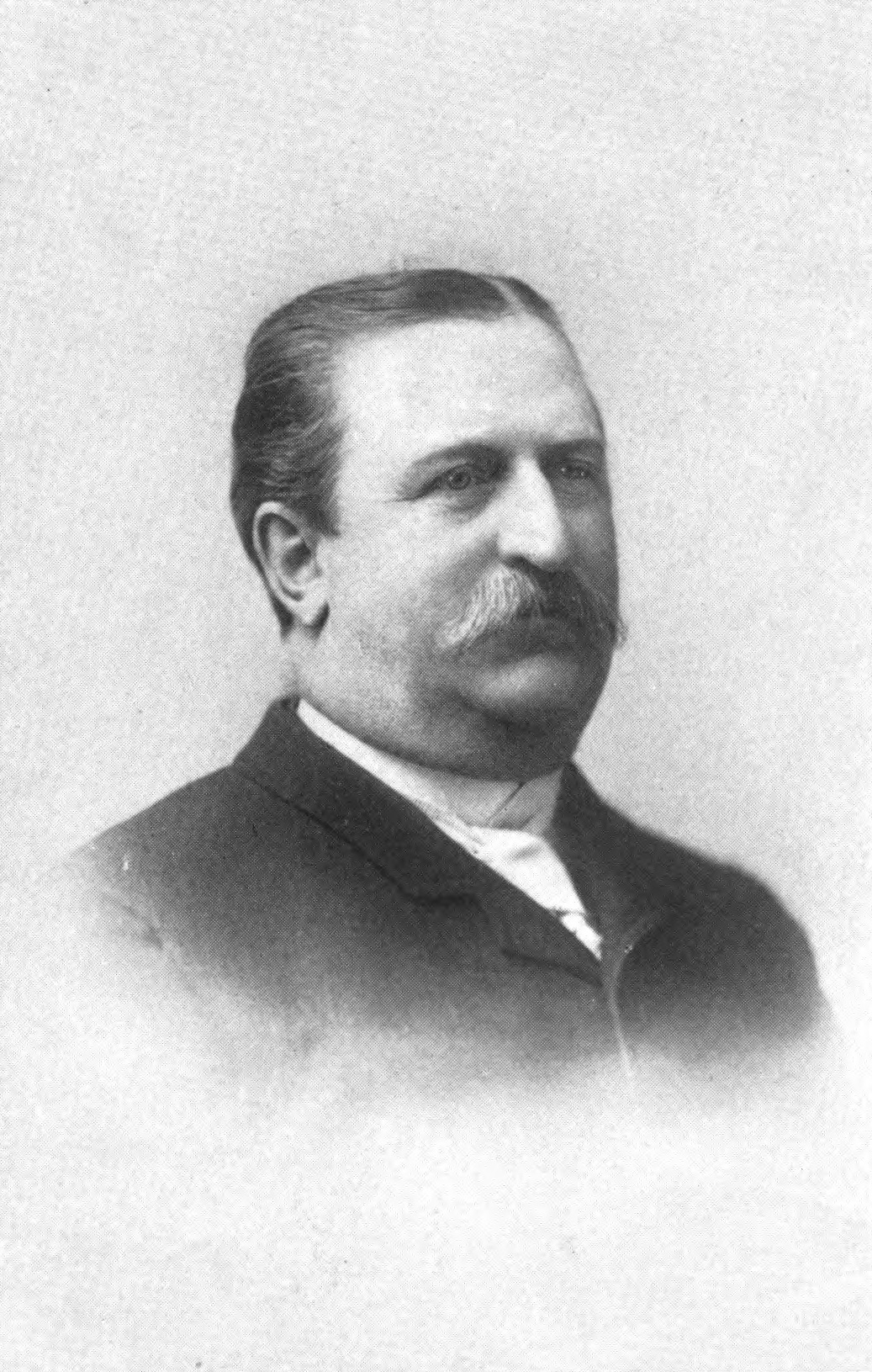

13th Mayor of San Francisco
- In office December 4, 1871 – November 30, 1873
- Preceded by: Thomas Henry Selby
- Succeeded by: James Otis

Personal details
- Born: January 3, 1833 Albany, New York, US
- Died: December 21, 1904 (aged 71) San Francisco, California, US
- Resting place: Cypress Lawn Memorial Park
- Party: Republican
- Profession: Merchant, banker

William Alvord (January 3, 1833 – December 21, 1904) was an American merchant, banker and politician who was the 13th Mayor of San Francisco from 1871 to 1873 and president of the Bank of California from 1878 until his death.

== Life and politics ==
Alvord was born in Albany, New York, the son of William and Mary Elizabeth (Whitney) Alvord. He was educated at Albany Academy. He moved to New York City in 1850 and engaged in the hardware trade. In 1853 he went to California and established his business at Marysville, later moving to San Francisco.

In San Francisco he established a wholesale hardware importing business, later forming a partnership with Richard Patrick. Alvord built up an extensive trade, but close application to business wore down his health. He finally sold his share to Patrick and went to Europe to recover his health.

Upon his return in 1871 he was nominated for Mayor of San Francisco on the Republican ticket. Alvord was elected by a handsome margin, serving from December 4, 1871, to November 30, 1873. A portrait of Alvord by Benoni Irwin, circa 1872, is in the collection of the Smithsonian American Art Museum.

Alvord later went east to purchase machinery for the Pacific Rolling Mills, of which he was one of the projectors and later president. He also was associated with the Risdon Iron and Locomotive Works. When the Bank of California crashed in 1875 he helped to reestablish it upon a sound financial basis.

Upon the retirement of Darius Ogden Mills as president of the Bank of California in 1878, Alvord was elected his successor. Under his leadership the bank became one of the chief centers of exchange between European money markets and those of Japan and China.

It was Alvord who, in 1887, warned James C. Flood of signs of irregularities at the Nevada Bank of San Francisco, enabling Flood to avert the collapse of the Nevada Bank from the wheat speculation of its cashier.

In April 1887, Alvord was awarded the Royal Order of the Star of Oceania by King of Hawaii Kalākaua.

In civic affairs, besides serving as Mayor of San Francisco Alvord was at different times park commissioner and police commissioner. He also helped organize memorial services for Ulysses S. Grant in 1885 and William McKinley in 1901.

He was president of the American Forestry Association in 1890-91, president of the Astronomical Society of the Pacific in 1898, and also served as president of the California Academy of Schools.

== Death and legacy ==
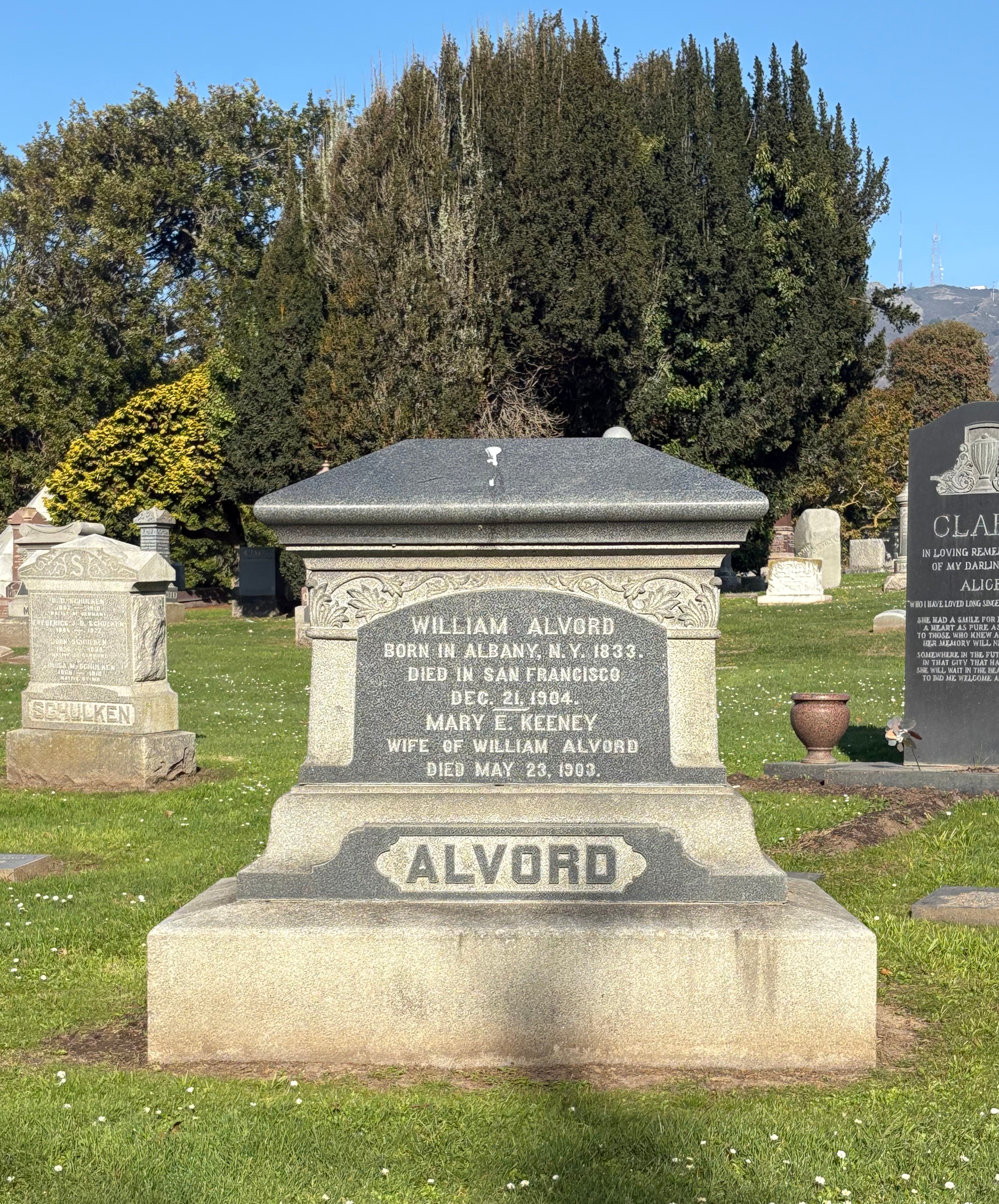
Alvord's grave at Cypress Lawn Memorial Park

Alvord remained president of the Bank of California until his death in San Francisco of heart failure due to bronchial troubles. Homer S. King left Wells Fargo & Company in January 1905 to succeed him as president of the bank. He was buried at Cypress Lawn Memorial Park.

His papers from circa 1874 to 1904 are preserved in the Bancroft Library at the University of California at Berkeley.
