= Joseph Morrill Wells =

American architect (1853 – 1890)

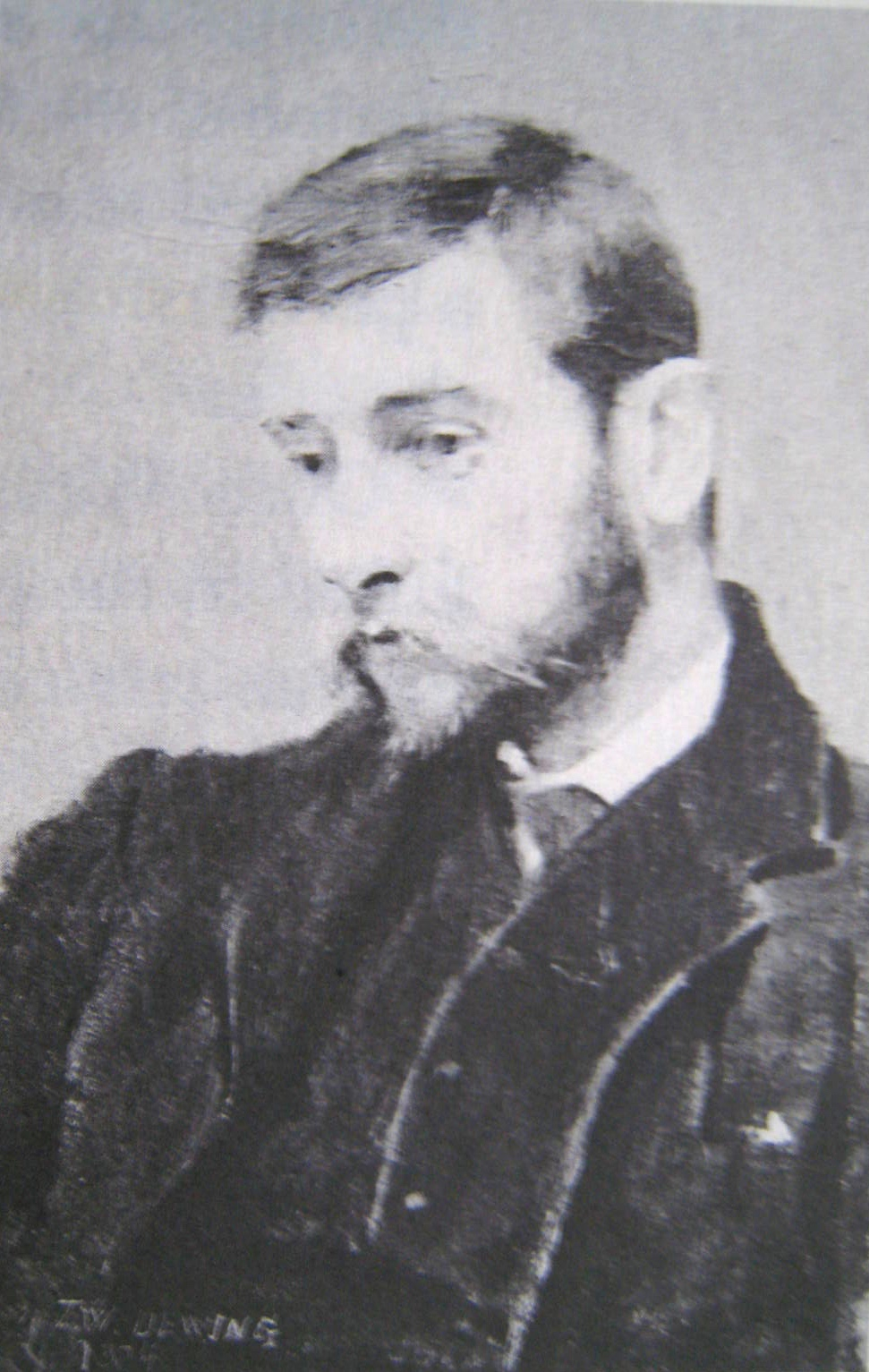
- Wells in 1884
- Born: March 1, 1853; Roxbury, Massachusetts
- Died: February 2, 1890 (aged 36); New York, New York
- Occupation: Architect
- Parent(s): Thomas Foster Wells and Sarah Morrill
- Buildings: Villard Houses, New York (contributor)

Joseph Morrill Wells (March 1, 1853 – February 2, 1890) was an American architect, known for his contributions to the work of the noteworthy architecture firm of McKim, Mead & White. Wells is said to have admired the architects of the Italian Renaissance, especially Donato Bramante, and to have been an important influence in the firm's transition in the mid-1880s away from "romantic and picturesque forms", and toward the classical.

== Early life and family ==
Joseph Morrill Wells was born in Roxbury, Massachusetts (now a part of Boston) on March 1, 1853, the son of Thomas Foster Wells (1822–1903), a shipping merchant and salvager of shipwrecks, and his wife, Sarah Morrill Wells (1828–1897). Samuel Adams, the Boston brewer and patriot, was a great-great-grandfather, and the poets Thomas Wells (1790–1861) and Anna Maria (Foster) Wells (1795–1868) were grandparents. Joseph Wells' brother, Webster Wells (1851–1916), was a professor of mathematics at the Massachusetts Institute of Technology and the author of numerous textbooks such as the Elementary Treatise on Logarithms (1878).

By 1849, the year Thomas Foster Wells married Sarah Morrill, he was in partnership with John Emery Gowen, trading in West India goods and importing liquors and wine. In the 1850s, Wells and Gowen conducted marine salvage operations while selling deep-sea diving gear, doing business as "Wells & Gowen Submarine Armor." In the years before the Civil War, Wells established "a line of clipper packets between Boston and Australia, which the war put an end to." (Note: Wells's maritime ventures harken back to the days of his seafaring great-grandfathers: Captain Francis Wells, a wine merchant, shipper, and captain of the Hempstead Galley, the ship on which he brought his family in 1723 from England to Boston; and Col. Joseph Foster, a Gloucester merchant active in the West Indies trade, and a notable participant in the Battle of Gloucester in August 1775.)

In 1860, Thomas and Sarah Wells lived at Roxbury with their four children, but by 1870, the family was living in New York City at 9 Horatio Street ("between West 4th and Hudson Streets"), where they remained until about 1873, and where Thomas Wells pursued his many business interests. One of these was the New York Metal and Chemical Manufacturing Co., incorporated in 1870 by Wells and others to convert scrap tin into iron, using Wells's patented methods.

By 1874, the family was living in a house at 137 Highland Street near Roxbury, and Thomas Wells commuted to his office at 3 Merchants Row in Boston, where he worked in real estate. In 1880, Thomas and Sarah Wells were living with their daughter Annie at Winchester, Massachusetts, a Boston suburb, where Thomas worked as a "trader in stocks," and where for a time he was president of the Granular Metal Co.

== Education and architectural career ==
Beginning in 1865 until about 1869, Joseph Wells attended the West Newton English and Classical School (aka the Allen School) in West Newton, Massachusetts, where he studied subjects such as art, music, dancing, and ethics, and where he was required to keep a daily journal (which he continued to keep for the rest of his life). In 1870 he lived with his parents and siblings in New York City on Horatio Street. He worked in Boston for the architects Peabody & Stearns from 1874 to 1875, and for the architect Clarence S. Luce from 1875 to 1878. (Note: In the 1873 Boston Directory, Wells is absent, presumably living in New York; Luce is a draftsman working at 17 Pembroke, presumably for the architect Gridley Bryant who had offices there. In the 1874 Directory, the firm of Peabody & Stearns has offices at 60 Devonshire, which Wells gave as his work address. In the 1875, 1876, and 1877 directories, Luce has an office at 17 Pemberton Square, and Wells is listed as working at that address; in 1878 Luce has an office at 11 Pemberton Square, and Wells is working at the same address (which in the 1875 and 1876 Directories is Luce's home address).) In January 1877, the New York architect Richard Morris Hunt published a drawing signed by Wells, but this may have been a freelance commission.

In 1879, Wells joined McKim, Mead & White and remained there until his death in 1890. Notwithstanding his many contributions to the firm's work, he was obscure in life and for a time thereafter. In 1908, the artist Will Low wrote that Wells's "practice was absorbed in that of the firm of architects where he was employed", and in 1913, the critic Royal Cortissoz called him "a man of genius unknown to the outer world and, indeed, no more familiar to many of the younger generation in his profession". His current reputation as an important member of the firm derives in part from the recollections of the architect Harold Van Buren Magonigle, who for a time worked alongside Wells and recalled him in an article written in 1934. According to Magonigle, the architect Charles McKim once told him that he had "learned more from [Wells] than from any other source." (Note: In The American Yearbook of 1911, Magonigle recalled that McKim had told him that "he had learned more from Joseph Wells than from any other living man.") Magonigle claimed that it was Wells who "weaned" the architect Stanford White away from the "romantic and picturesque forms" he admired before he entered his classical phase in the mid-1880s. He credited Wells with the design (based on White's preliminary sketches) of the firm's Villard Houses (1884) and the detailing of the facade of the Century Association's New York clubhouse (1891).

Earlier, in 1924, Magonigle made even greater claims for Wells, writing that "there was a moment of great promise in the history of American design when it looked as though the influence of the genius of Joseph Morrill Wells would direct American thought toward a virile and fruitful eclecticism that would lead in its turn toward an architecture we could fairly call our own...but Wells died in the very early nineties...the [1893 Chicago] World's Fair came on and turned our minds toward Greece and Rome, and another Classic revival ensued...and so began the baneful use of precedent..."

The historian Henry-Russell Hitchcock, writing in 1972, claimed the opposite for Wells—that he rejected eclecticism and embraced the use of precedent (Hitchcock called it "direct inspiration"). He saw Wells's design for the Villard Houses not only as a harbinger of the shift to the classical and symmetrical, but also as part of a broader transition from European to American leadership in architectural design, writing that "a change in American architecture came...in the early eighties with the designing and building of the Villard houses in New York." According to Hitchcock, "the rejection of the English High Victorian and even of Shavian-manorial irregularity and picturesqueness is here at its extreme even at the very beginning. It was, moreover, almost immediately reflected in the planning of [McKim, Mead & White]'s H.A.C. Taylor house in Newport, a year or two later, in which there was a return to the formal Anglo-Palladian mode of the eighteenth century." Noting that the classical trend came several years later to England, Hitchcock opined that "this was the point where the tide turns, when American leadership, although not yet much followed, was beginning to be recognized abroad."

Others took a more measured view of Wells's influence. Charles Baldwin, Stanford White's biographer, acknowledged Wells's having introduced the Renaissance to the firm with his facades for the Villard Houses, but attributed White's shift to the classical more to his 1884 European honeymoon, writing, "...White's wedding trip through Europe opened his eyes. Returning, supported by Wells, he began to practice—and preach—Italian Renaissance as a style and a tradition better suited to American needs than any or all phases of Gothic, Romanesque, or...strictly classical architecture." William Mitchell Kendall, who became a partner in the firm in 1906, recalled Wells's role as having been subsidiary to those of the partners: "So far as I know his work was confined to the details of building. In that he was supreme. Nobody before or since has equalled him in the appropriateness and scale of his ornamentation: and this of course gave great character to the buildings he decorated. But the ensemble, and by implication, the kind of decoration, was invariably decided by a member of the firm."

Nevertheless, there were instances where Wells had greater responsibility for the composition. William R. Mead, a partner more inclined to manage than design, collaborated with Wells on major projects in Kansas City and Omaha for the New York Life Insurance Company, projects that failed to interest McKim or White, and therefore gave Wells a significant say in the overall design. Years later, Mead wrote of Wells's status as first among equals among the firm's employees during its early days: "In 1879, shortly before the establishment of the firm, Joseph M. Wells came into our office...I suppose he had merely a good high school education, but he was one of the most learned young men in literature and art whom I have ever met, and a most original thinker...in his quiet, almost unsocial, way he immediately made an impression upon all of us, and became our intimate friend and associate, not only in our work but in our daily lives...I recall the times when we four were working together in the bonds of true fellowship."

Wells's last assignment at McKim, Mead & White was to design the details for Madison Square Garden (completed in 1890), but illness kept him from the task.

== Death ==
Joseph Morrill Wells' tombstone after restoration in 2020.

A detail of Joseph Morrill Wells' tombstone.

Wells died of pneumonia on February 2, 1890, in New York City.

He was buried in the Oak Grove Cemetery in Medford, Massachusetts, where Stanford White and the sculptor Augustus Saint-Gaudens erected a tombstone in the form of a tall Greek stele. The tombstone was removed in 2019, restored, and reinstalled in May 2020.

== See also ==
Wells family

- Anna Maria Wells and Thomas Wells, poets, Joseph Wells's grandparents
- Webster Wells, mathematician, Joseph Wells's brother
- Annie Renouf-Whelpley, artist; Joseph Wells’s first cousin
- Mai Wells, silent film actress; Joseph Wells's first cousin
- John Witt Randall, art collector, Joseph Wells’s first cousin once removed
- Frederick Adams Wells, politician, Joseph Wells’s second cousin
