= Thomas Henry Selby =

12th Mayor of San Francisco from 1869 to 1871

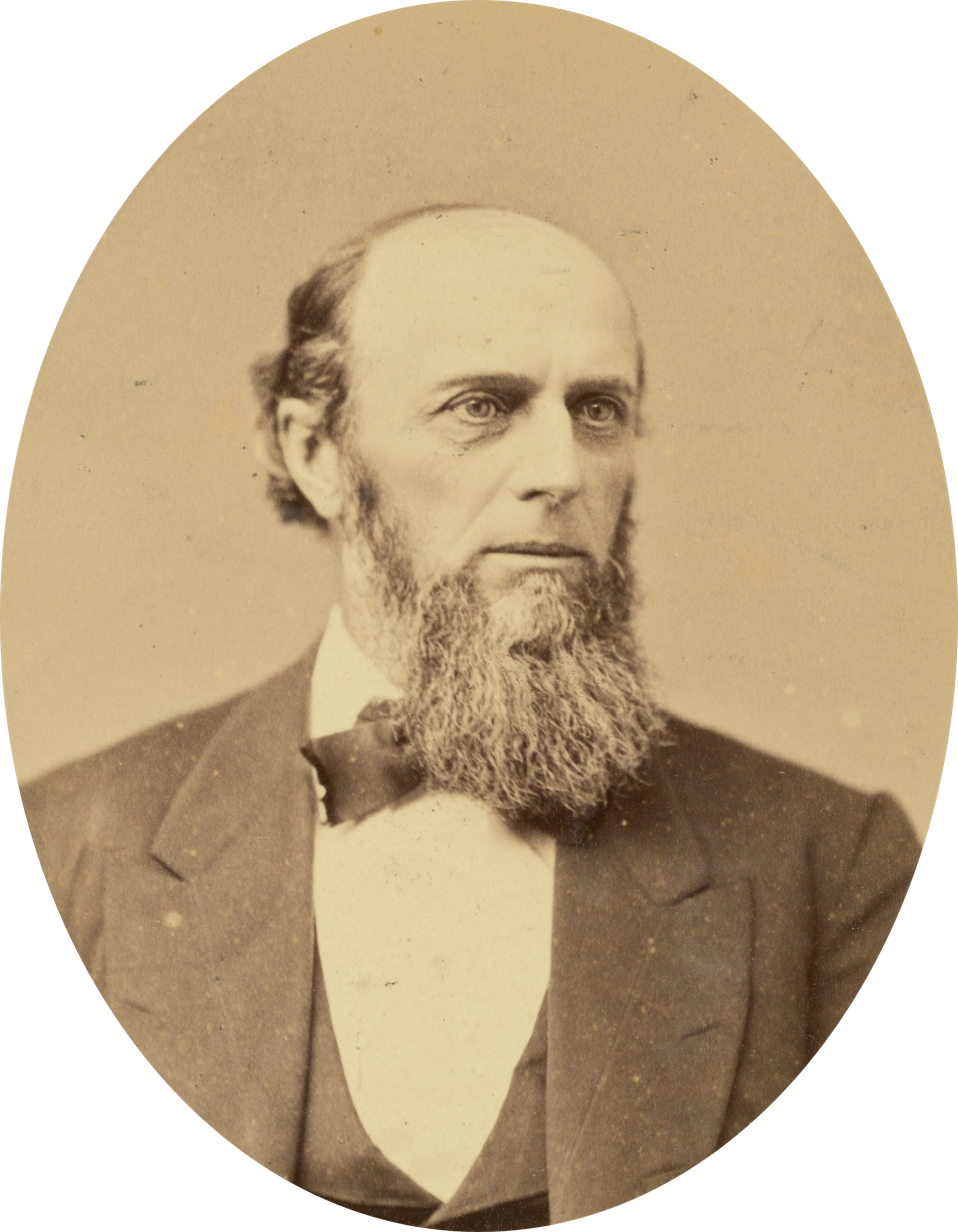
- Portrait by I. W. Taber c. 1871–1875

12th Mayor of San Francisco
- In office December 6, 1869 – December 3, 1871
- Preceded by: Frank McCoppin
- Succeeded by: William Alvord

Personal details
- Born: May 14, 1820 New York City, New York, U.S.
- Died: June 17, 1875 (aged 55) San Francisco, California, U.S.

Thomas Henry Selby (May 14, 1820 – June 17, 1875) was an American politician and businessperson. He served as the 12th Mayor of San Francisco, from December 6, 1869 until December 3, 1871. He was the first Republican mayor of San Francisco.

== Biography ==
Thomas Henry Selby was born on May 14, 1820, in New York City, New York.

When he was 29 years old, Selby went to California for the California Gold Rush. He moved to San Francisco, California and became a merchant in the city. Selby built the Selby Shot Tower in San Francisco and founded the Selby Smelting Works.

He was then elected mayor and served from December 6, 1869, to December 3, 1871.

Selby died in San Francisco on June 17, 1875, of pneumonia. He is buried in Mountain View Cemetery in Oakland, California.

== Family ==
Selby's daughter, Jeanie, married Faxon Dean Atherton Jr., a son of Atherton namesake Faxon Dean Atherton. His daughter Clair married Andrew Jackson Ralston, brother of William Chapman Ralston. His son, Prentiss, married Nattie Cofin of the Nantucket Cofins. His daughter, Cornelia, married Rear-Admiral Louis Kempff of Belleville, Ill.
