= Webster Wells =

American mathematician (1851–1916)

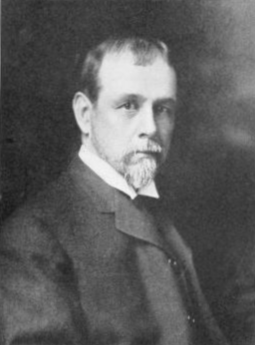
- Born: September 4, 1851; Boston, Massachusetts, U.S.
- Died: May 23, 1916 (aged 64); Arlington, Massachusetts, U.S.
- Education: Massachusetts Institute of Technology
- Scientific career
- Fields: Mathematics
- Workplaces: Massachusetts Institute of Technology

Webster Wells (1851–1916) was an American mathematician known primarily for his authorship of mathematical textbooks.

== Early life and career ==
Wells was born in Roxbury, Massachusetts (now a part of Boston) on September 4, 1851. His parents, Thomas Foster Wells (1822–1903) and Sarah Morrill Wells (1828–1897), initially named him Thomas Wells, but presumably after the death of the statesman Daniel Webster in 1852, renamed him Daniel Webster Wells, and from at least 1860, he was known as Webster Wells. Samuel Adams, the Boston brewer and patriot, was a great-great-grandfather, and the poets Thomas Wells (1790–1861) and Anna Maria (Foster) Wells (1795–1868) were grandparents. The architect Joseph Morrill Wells was his brother.

Beginning in 1863, Wells studied at the West Newton English and Classical School (aka the Allen School) in West Newton, Massachusetts, and then attended Massachusetts Institute of Technology, from which he graduated in 1873 with a Bachelor of Science degree. Wells taught mathematics at MIT, where he was successively instructor (1873–1880), assistant professor (1883), associate professor (1885), and full professor (1893–1911).

== Personal life ==
Webster Wells married Emily Walker Langdon in Boston on June 21, 1876.

In Europe at the outbreak of World War I, Wells and his wife returned to Brookline on the refugee ship Principe di Undine.

Wells died in Arlington, Massachusetts, on May 23, 1916, from complications of Huntington's Chorea. He was buried in Oak Grove Cemetery in Medford, Massachusetts.

== Textbooks ==
Wells' textbooks were used in many schools and colleges in the United States. Among the many titles were:

- Webster Wells. Elementary Treatise on Logarithms (Boston, MA: Robert S. Davies Co., 1878).
- Webster Wells. University Algebra (Boston MA: Leach, Shewell & Sanborn, 1880), one of "Greenleaf's Mathematical Series."
- Webster Wells. Practical Textbook on Plane and Spherical Trigonometry (Boston, MA: Leach, Shewell & Sanborn, 1883).
- Webster Wells. A Complete Course in Algebra for Academies and High Schools (Boston, MA: Leach, Shewell & Sanborn, 1885).
- Webster Wells. The Elements of Geometry (Boston, MA: Leach, Shewell & Sanborn, 1886).
- Webster Wells. Plane and Solid Geometry (1887).
- Webster Wells. The Essentials of Plane and Spherical Trigonometry (Boston, MA: Leach, Shewell & Sanborn, 1887).
- Webster Wells. Plane Trigonometry (Boston, MA: Leach, Shewell & Sanborn, 1887).
- Webster Wells. Four-place Logarithmic Tables (1888).
- Webster Wells. A Short Course in Higher Algebra (Boston, MA: Leach, Shewell & Sanborn, 1889), one of "Wells' Mathematical Series."
- Webster Wells. College Algebra (Boston, MA: D.C. Heath & Co., 1890).
- Webster Wells. An Academic Arithmetic for Academies, High and Commercial Schools (1893, 1899).
- Webster Wells. Plane Trigonometry (Boston, MA: Leach, Shewell & Sanborn, 1893), one of "Wells' Mathematical Series."
- Webster Wells. Revised Plane and Solid Geometry (1894).
- Webster Wells. New Plane and Spherical Trigonometry (1896).
- Webster Wells. Essentials of Algebra for Secondary Schools (Norwood MA: Norwood Press, 1897).
- Webster Wells. New Higher Algebra (Boston, MA: D.C. Heath & Co., 1897, 1899).
- Webster Wells. The Essentials of Geometry (Solid) (Boston, MA: D.C. Heath & Co., 1899).
- Webster Wells. Complete Trigonometry (Boston, MA: D.C. Heath & Co., 1901, copyright 1900).
- Webster Wells. Factoring (Boston, MA: D.C. Heath & Co., 1902), one of “Heath’s Mathematical Monographs.”
- Claribel Gerrish and Webster Wells. The Beginner's Algebra (Boston, MA: D.C. Heath & Co., 1902).
- Webster Wells. Advanced Course in Algebra (Boston, MA: D.C. Heath & Co., 1904).
- Webster Wells. Algebra for Secondary Schools (Boston, MA: D.C. Heath & Co., 1906, 1909).
- Webster Wells. New Plane Geometry (1908).
- Webster Wells. New Plane and Solid Geometry (Boston, MA: D.C. Heath & Co., 1909).
- Webster Wells and Walter W. Hart. First Year Algebra (Boston, MA: D.C. Heath & Co. 1912).
- Webster Wells. New High School Algebra (1912).
- Webster Wells. Second Course in Algebra (1913).
- Webster Wells and Walter W. Hart. Plane Geometry (Boston, MA: D.C. Heath & Co., 1915), one of "Wells and Hart's Mathematics Series."
- Webster Wells. Plane and Solid Geometry (1916).

=== Posthumous editions ===
- Webster Wells. Modern Algebra: Second Course (1920).
- Webster Wells. Modern First Year Algebra (1923).
- Webster Wells. Modern Algebra: Second Course (1925).
- Webster Wells and Walter W. Hart. Modern First Year Algebra, Revised (Boston, MA: D.C. Heath & Co., copyright 1928).

== See also ==
- Joseph Morrill Wells, architect; Webster Wells’ brother
- Anna Maria Wells, poet; Webster Wells’ grandmother
- Frederick A. Wells, politician, Webster Wells' second cousin
- John Witt Randall, art collector; Webster Wells’ first cousin once removed
