= James Otis (mayor) =

15th Mayor of San Francisco from 1873 to 1875

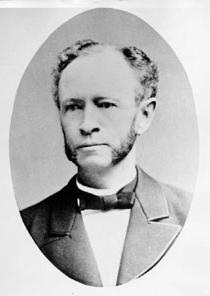

15th Mayor of San Francisco
- In office December 1, 1873 – October 30, 1875
- Preceded by: William Alvord
- Succeeded by: George Hewston

Personal details
- Born: August 11, 1826; Boston, Massachusetts, U.S.
- Died: October 30, 1875 (aged 49); San Francisco, California, U.S.
- Spouse: Lucy Hamilton Macondray (m. 1858–1875; death)
- Children: 7

James Otis (August 11, 1826 – October 30, 1875) was an American politician. He was active in San Francisco, where he served as mayor from 1873 to 1875.

== Biography ==
Coat of Arms of James Otis

James Otis was born in Boston, Massachusetts to the Otis family, which is counted among the Boston Brahmin families. He was the grandson of James Otis Jr. of the American Revolutionary War.

He moved to San Francisco, California for the 1849 California Gold Rush. He was a prominent member of the First Unitarian Church of San Francisco. In 1858, Otis married Lucy Hamilton Macondray, together they had two daughters and five sons. Otis then became an importer and exporter in San Francisco, working at his father-in-law Frederick William Macondray's business Macondray and Company.

Otis became a member of the San Francisco Board of Supervisors in 1859 and served until 1862. Otis was then elected Mayor of San Francisco in 1873 and was sworn in on December 1, 1873. His campaign was for flushing the sewers and cleaning up the streets.

He died of diphtheria in San Francisco on October 30, 1875, while still serving his term as mayor. Otis was interred at Laurel Hill Cemetery; and his remains were later moved to Cypress Lawn Memorial Park in Colma, California. He was the only mayor to die in office until George Moscone's assassination in 1978.

Prairie Creek Redwoods State Park in Humboldt County has a redwood grove named the James Otis Grove (as of 1947). San Francisco has an Otis Street, named after him.
