= Edgar Allan Poe bibliography =

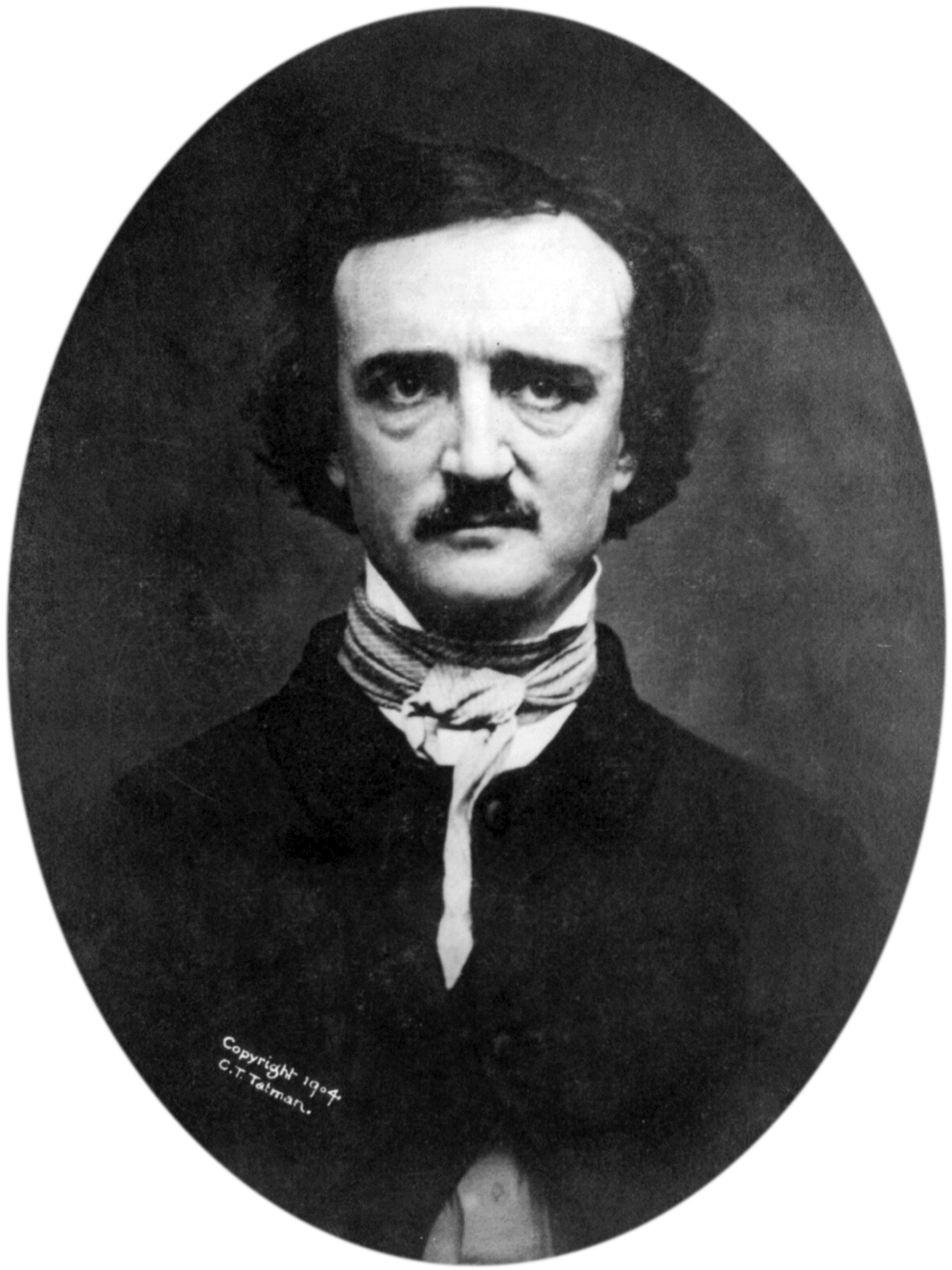
Poe in 1848

The works of American author Edgar Allan Poe (January 19, 1809 – October 7, 1849) include many poems, short stories, and one novel. His fiction spans multiple genres, including horror fiction, adventure, science fiction, and detective fiction, a genre he is credited with inventing. These works are generally considered part of the Dark Romanticism movement, a literary reaction to Transcendentalism. Poe's writing reflects his literary theories: he disagreed with didacticism and allegory. Meaning in literature, he said in his criticism, should be an undercurrent just beneath the surface; works whose meanings are too obvious cease to be art. Poe pursued originality in his works, and disliked proverbs. He often included elements of popular pseudosciences such as phrenology and physiognomy. His most recurring themes deal with questions of death, including its physical signs, the effects of decomposition, concerns of premature burial, the reanimation of the dead, and mourning. Though known as a masterly practitioner of Gothic fiction, Poe did not invent the genre; he was following a long-standing popular tradition.

Poe's literary career began in 1827 with the release of 50 copies of Tamerlane and Other Poems credited only to "a Bostonian", a collection of early poems that received virtually no attention. In December 1829, Poe released Al Aaraaf, Tamerlane, and Minor Poems in Baltimore before delving into short stories for the first time with "Metzengerstein" in 1832. His most successful and most widely read prose during his lifetime was "The Gold-Bug", which earned him a $100 prize, the most money he received for a single work. One of his most important works, "The Murders in the Rue Morgue", was published in 1841 and is today considered the first modern detective story. Poe called it a "tale of ratiocination". Poe became a household name with the publication of "The Raven" in 1845, though it was not a financial success. The publishing industry at the time was a difficult career choice and much of Poe's work was written using themes specifically catered for mass market tastes.

== Poetry ==
Title	Date	First published in	Notes
"Poetry"	1824	Never published in Poe's lifetime	
"O, Tempora! O, Mores!"	1825	Never published in Poe's lifetime	Not authenticated, attribution to Poe is likely incorrect
"Tamerlane"	July 1827	Tamerlane and Other Poems	
"Song"	July 1827	Tamerlane and Other Poems	
"Imitation"	July 1827	Tamerlane and Other Poems	
"A Dream"	July 1827	Tamerlane and Other Poems	
"The Lake"	July 1827	Tamerlane and Other Poems	
"Spirits of the Dead"	July 1827	Tamerlane and Other Poems	
"Evening Star"	July 1827	Tamerlane and Other Poems	
"Dreams"	July 1827	Tamerlane and Other Poems	
"Stanzas"	July 1827	Tamerlane and Other Poems	
"The Happiest Day"	September 15, 1827	The North American	
"To Margaret"	circa 1827	Never published in Poe's lifetime	
"Alone"	1829	Never published in Poe's lifetime	
"To Isaac Lea"	circa 1829	Never published in Poe's lifetime	
"To The River ——"	1829	Al Aaraaf, Tamerlane, and Minor Poems	
"To ——"	1829	Al Aaraaf, Tamerlane, and Minor Poems	Begins "The bowers whereat, in dreams..."
"To ——"	1829	Al Aaraaf, Tamerlane, and Minor Poems	Begins "Should my early life seem..."
"Romance"	1829	Al Aaraaf, Tamerlane, and Minor Poems	
"Fairy-Land"	1829	Al Aaraaf, Tamerlane, and Minor Poems	
"To Science"	1829	Al Aaraaf, Tamerlane, and Minor Poems	
"Al Aaraaf"	1829	Al Aaraaf, Tamerlane, and Minor Poems	
"An Acrostic"	1829	Never published in Poe's lifetime	
"Elizabeth"	1829	Never published in Poe's lifetime	
"To Helen"	1831	Poems by Edgar A. Poe	
"A Paean"	1831	Poems by Edgar A. Poe	
"The Sleeper"	1831	Poems by Edgar A. Poe	
"The City in the Sea"	1831	Poems by Edgar A. Poe	
"The Valley of Unrest"	1831	Poems by Edgar A. Poe	
"Israfel"	1831	Poems by Edgar A. Poe	
"Enigma"	February 2, 1833	Baltimore Saturday Visiter	
"Fanny"	May 18, 1833	Baltimore Saturday Visiter	
"The Coliseum"	October 26, 1833	Baltimore Saturday Visiter	
"Serenade"	April 20, 1833	Baltimore Saturday Visiter	
"To One in Paradise"	January 1834	Godey's Lady's Book	
"Hymn"	April 1835	Southern Literary Messenger	
"To Elizabeth"	September 1835	Southern Literary Messenger	Republished as "To F——s S. O——d" in 1845
"May Queen Ode"	circa 1836	Never published in Poe's lifetime	
"Spiritual Song"	1836	Never published in Poe's lifetime	
"Latin Hymn"	March 1836	Southern Literary Messenger	
"Bridal Ballad"	January 1837	Southern Literary Messenger	Originally published as "Ballad"
"To Zante"	January 1837	Southern Literary Messenger	
"The Haunted Palace"	April 1839	American Museum	
"Silence–A Sonnet"	January 4, 1840	Saturday Courier	
"Lines on Joe Locke"	February 28, 1843	Saturday Museum	
"The Conqueror Worm"	January 1843	Graham's Magazine	
"Lenore"	February 1843	The Pioneer	
"A Campaign Song"	1844	Never published in Poe's lifetime	
"Dream-Land"	June 1844	Graham's Magazine	
"Impromptu. To Kate Carol"	April 26, 1845	Broadway Journal	
"To F——"	April 1845	Broadway Journal	Republished as "To Frances" in the September 6, 1845, issue of the Broadway Journal
"Eulalie"	July 1845	American Review: A Whig Journal	
"Epigram for Wall Street"	January 23, 1845	Evening Mirror	
"The Raven"	February 1845	American Review: A Whig Journal	
"The Divine Right of Kings"	October 1845	Graham's Magazine	
"A Valentine"	February 21, 1846	Evening Mirror	Originally published as "To Her Whose Name Is Written Below"
"Beloved Physician"	1847	Never published in Poe's lifetime	Incomplete
"Deep in Earth"	1847	Never published in Poe's lifetime	Incomplete
"To M. L. S—— (1847)"	March 13, 1847	The Home Journal	
"Ulalume"	December 1847	American Whig Review	
"Lines on Ale"	1848	Never published in Poe's lifetime	
"To Marie Louise"	March 1848	Columbian Magazine	
"An Enigma"	March 1848	Union Magazine of Literature and Art	
"To Helen"	November 1848	Sartain's Union Magazine	
"A Dream Within A Dream"	March 31, 1849	The Flag of Our Union	
"Eldorado"	April 21, 1849	Flag of Our Union	
"For Annie"	April 28, 1849	Flag of Our Union	
"To My Mother"	July 7, 1849	Flag of Our Union	
"Annabel Lee"	October 9, 1849	New York Daily Tribune	Sold before Poe's death but published posthumously
"The Bells"	November 1849	Sartain's Union Magazine	Sold before Poe's death but published posthumously

== Tales ==
Title	Publication date	First published in	Genre	Notes
"Metzengerstein"	January 14, 1832	Philadelphia Saturday Courier	Horror / Satire	First published anonymously with the subtitle "A Tale in Imitation of the German"
"The Duc de L'Omelette"	March 3, 1832	Philadelphia Saturday Courier	Humor	Originally "The Duke of l'Omelette"
"A Tale of Jerusalem" (text on wikisource)	June 9, 1832	Philadelphia Saturday Courier	Humor	
"Loss of Breath"	November 10, 1832	Philadelphia Saturday Courier	Humor	Originally "A Decided Loss"
"Bon-Bon"	December 1, 1832	Philadelphia Saturday Courier	Humor	Originally "The Bargain Lost"
"MS. Found in a Bottle"	October 19, 1833	Baltimore Saturday Visiter	Adventure	
"The Assignation" (text on wikisource)	January 1834	Godey's Lady's Book	Horror	Originally "The Visionary", published anonymously
"Berenice"	March 1835	Southern Literary Messenger	Horror	
"Morella"	April 1835	Southern Literary Messenger	Horror	
"Lionizing" (text on wikisource)	May 1835	Southern Literary Messenger	Satire	Subtitle: "A Tale"
"The Unparalleled Adventure of One Hans Pfaall"	June 1835	Southern Literary Messenger	Hoax / Adventure	
"King Pest" (text on wikisource)	September 1835	Southern Literary Messenger	Horror / Humor	Originally "King Pest the First", published anonymously
"Shadow—A Parable" (text on wikisource)	September 1835	Southern Literary Messenger	Horror	Published anonymously
"Four Beasts in One—The Homo-Cameleopard" (text on wikisource)	March 1836	Southern Literary Messenger	Humor	Originally "Epimanes"
"Mystification" (text on wikisource)	June 1837	American Monthly Magazine	Humor	Originally "Von Jung, the Mystific"
"Silence—A Fable" (text on wikisource)	1838	Baltimore Book	Horror / Fantasy	Originally "Siope—A Fable"
"Ligeia"	September 1838	Baltimore American Museum	Horror	Republished in the February 15, 1845, issue of the New York World, included the poem "The Conqueror Worm" as words written by Ligeia on her death-bed
"How to Write a Blackwood Article"	November 1838	Baltimore American Museum	Parody	An introduction to "A Predicament"
"A Predicament"	November 1838	Baltimore American Museum	Parody	Companion to "How to Write a Blackwood Article," originally "The Scythe of Time"
"The Devil in the Belfry"	May 18, 1839	Saturday Chronicle and Mirror of the Times	Humor / Satire	
"The Man That Was Used Up"	August 1839	Burton's Gentleman's Magazine	Satire	
"The Fall of the House of Usher"	September 1839	Burton's Gentleman's Magazine	Horror	
"William Wilson"	October 1839	The Gift: A Christmas and New Year's Present for 1840	Horror	
"The Conversation of Eiros and Charmion"	December 1839	Burton's Gentleman's Magazine	Science fiction	
"Why the Little Frenchman Wears His Hand in a Sling" (text on wikisource)	1840	Tales of the Grotesque and Arabesque	Humor	
"The Business Man"	February 1840	Burton's Gentleman's Magazine	Humor	Originally "Peter Pendulum"
"The Man of the Crowd"	December 1840	Graham's Magazine	Horror	
"The Murders in the Rue Morgue"	April 1841	Graham's Magazine	Detective fiction	First appearance of C. Auguste Dupin
"A Descent into the Maelström"	May 1841	Graham's Magazine	Adventure	
"The Island of the Fay" (text on wikisource)	June 1841	Graham's Magazine	Fantasy	
"The Colloquy of Monos and Una" (text on wikisource)	August 1841	Graham's Magazine	Science fiction	
"Never Bet the Devil Your Head"	September 1841	Graham's Magazine	Satire	Subtitled "A Tale with a Moral"
"Eleonora"	Fall 1841	The Gift for 1842	Romance	
"Three Sundays in a Week" (text on wikisource)	November 27, 1841	Saturday Evening Post	Humor	Originally "A Succession of Sundays"
"The Oval Portrait"	April 1842	Graham's Magazine	Horror	Originally "Life in Death"
"The Masque of the Red Death"	May 1842	Graham's Magazine	Horror	Originally "The Mask of the Red Death"
"The Landscape Garden" (text on wikisource)	October 1842	Snowden's Ladies' Companion	Sketch	Later incorporated into "The Domain of Arnheim"
"The Mystery of Marie Rogêt"	November 1842, December 1842, February 1843 (serialized)	Snowden's Ladies' Companion	Detective fiction	Originally subtitled "A Sequel to 'The Murders in the Rue Morgue'" — second Dupin story
"The Pit and the Pendulum"	1842–1843	The Gift: A Christmas and New Year's Present	Horror	
"The Tell-Tale Heart"	January 1843	The Pioneer	Horror	
"The Gold-Bug"	June 1843	Dollar Newspaper	Adventure	
"The Black Cat"	August 19, 1843	United States Saturday Post	Horror	
"Diddling" (text on wikisource)	October 14, 1843	Philadelphia Saturday Courier	Parody	Originally "Raising the Wind; or, Diddling Considered as One of the Exact Sciences"
"The Spectacles"	March 27, 1844	Dollar Newspaper	Humor	
"A Tale of the Ragged Mountains"	April 1844	Godey's Lady's Book	Science fiction, Adventure	
"The Premature Burial"	July 31, 1844	Dollar Newspaper	Horror	
"Mesmeric Revelation" (text on wikisource)	August 1844	Columbian Magazine	Science fiction	
"The Oblong Box"	September 1844	Godey's Lady's Book	Horror / Ratiocination	
"The Angel of the Odd"	October 1844	Columbian Magazine	Humor	Subtitled "An Extravaganza"
"Thou Art the Man"	November 1844	Godey's Lady's Book	Detective fiction / Satire	
"The Literary Life of Thingum Bob, Esq." (text on wikisource)	December 1844	Southern Literary Messenger	Humor	
"The Purloined Letter"	1844–1845	The Gift: A Christmas and New Year's Present	Detective fiction	Third and final Dupin story
"The Thousand-and-Second Tale of Scheherazade"	February 1845	Godey's Lady's Book	Humor	Meant as a sequel to One Thousand and One Nights
"Some Words with a Mummy"	April 1845	American Review: A Whig Journal	Satire	
"The Power of Words" (text on wikisource)	June 1845	Democratic Review	Science fiction	
"The Imp of the Perverse"	July 1845	Graham's Magazine	Horror	
"The System of Doctor Tarr and Professor Fether"	November 1845	Graham's Magazine	Humor	
"The Facts in the Case of M. Valdemar"	December 1845	The American Review	Hoax / Science fiction / Horror	Originally "The Facts of M. Valdemar's Case"
"The Sphinx" (text on wikisource)	January 1846	Arthur's Ladies Magazine	Satire	
"The Cask of Amontillado"	November 1846	Godey's Lady's Book	Horror	
"The Domain of Arnheim" (text on wikisource)	March 1847	Columbian Lady's and Gentleman's Magazine	Sketch	Expansion of previous story "The Landscape Garden"
"Mellonta Tauta" (text on wikisource)	February 1849	Godey's Lady's Book	Science fiction	
"Hop-Frog"	March 17, 1849	Flag of Our Union	Horror	Subtitled "Or, The Eight Chained Ourang-Outangs"
"Von Kempelen and His Discovery" (text on wikisource)	April 14, 1849	Flag of Our Union	Hoax / Satire	
"X-ing a Paragrab" (text on wikisource)	May 12, 1849	Flag of Our Union	Humor	
"Landor's Cottage" (text on wikisource)	June 9, 1849	Flag of Our Union	Sketch	Originally "Landor's Cottage: A Pendant to 'The Domain of Arnheim'"

== Other works ==
=== Essays ===
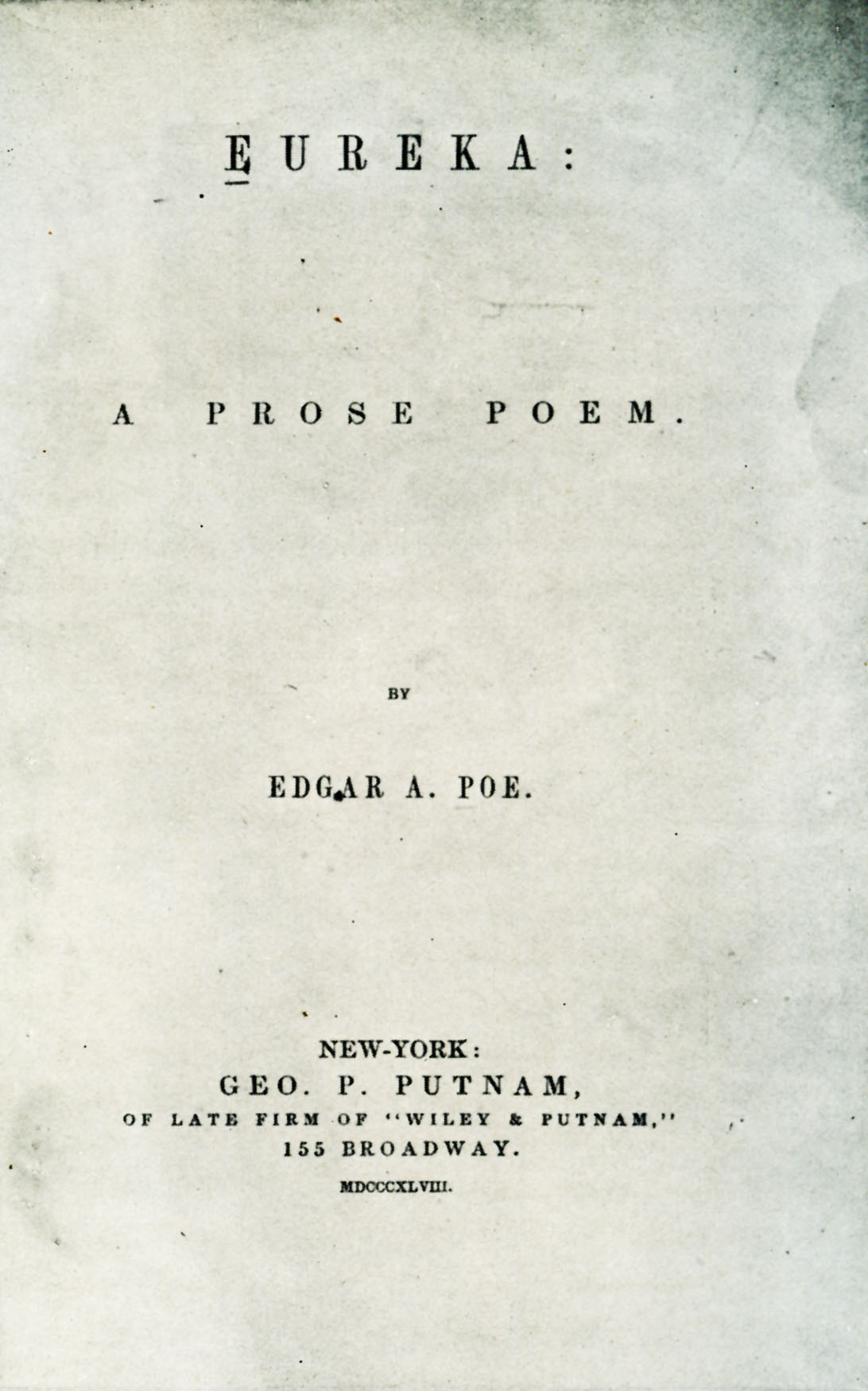
Eureka: A Prose Poem (1848)

- "Maelzel's Chess Player" (April 1836 – Southern Literary Messenger)
- "The Philosophy of Furniture" (May 1840 – Burton's Gentleman's Magazine)
- "A Few Words on Secret Writing" (July 1841 – Graham's Magazine)
- "Morning on the Wissahiccon" (1844 – The Opal)
- "The Balloon-Hoax" (April 13, 1844 – The Sun) – A newspaper article that was actually a journalistic hoax
- "American Poetry" (November 1845 – The Aristidean)
- "The Philosophy of Composition" (April 1846 – Graham's Magazine)
- "Eureka: A Prose Poem" (March 1848 – Wiley & Putnam)
- "The Rationale of Verse" (October 1848 – Southern Literary Messenger)
- "The Poetic Principle" (December 1848 – Southern Literary Messenger)

=== Novels ===
- The Narrative of Arthur Gordon Pym of Nantucket (First two installments, January/February 1837 – Southern Literary Messenger, issued as complete novel in July 1838)
- The Journal of Julius Rodman (First six installments, January–June 1840 – Burton's Gentleman's Magazine) – Incomplete

=== Plays ===
- Politian (Two installments, December 1835 – January 1836 – Southern Literary Messenger) – Incomplete

=== Other ===
- Tales of the Folio Club – A projected collection of Poe's tales on "dunderism" satirizing the Delphian Club which was never completed in his lifetime
- The Philosophy of Animal Magnetism – A pamphlet on Mesmerism credited to a "Gentleman of Philadelphia" (1837), attributed to Poe using stylometry
- The Conchologist's First Book (1839) – A textbook on sea shells produced by Poe as a condensed version of a textbook by Thomas Wyatt
- The Light-House (1849, never published in Poe's lifetime) – An incomplete work that may have been intended to be a short story or a novel

== Collections ==
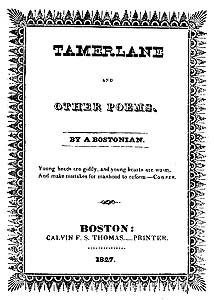
Tamerlane and Other Poems (1827)

This list of collections refers only to those printed during Poe's lifetime with his permission. Modern anthologies are not included.

- Tamerlane and Other Poems (credited by "a Bostonian") (1827)
- Al Aaraaf, Tamerlane and Minor Poems (1829)
- Poems (1831, printed as "second edition")
- Tales of the Grotesque and Arabesque (December 1839)
- The Prose Romances of Edgar A. Poe (1843)
- Tales (1845, Wiley & Putnam)
- The Raven and Other Poems (1845, Wiley & Putnam)

== See also ==
American journals that Edgar Allan Poe was involved with include:

- American Review: A Whig Journal
- Broadway Journal
- Burton's Gentleman's Magazine
- Godey's Lady's Book
- Graham's Magazine
- Southern Literary Messenger
- The Stylus
