= The Fall of the House of Usher (miniseries) =

2023 American television miniseries

- Promotional poster
- Genre: Drama; Gothic horror
- Created by: Mike Flanagan
- Based on: "The Fall of the House of Usher" and other works by Edgar Allan Poe
- Directed by: Mike Flanagan; Michael Fimognari
- Starring: Carla Gugino; Bruce Greenwood; Mary McDonnell; Henry Thomas; Kate Siegel; Rahul Kohli; Samantha Sloyan; T'Nia Miller; Zach Gilford; Willa Fitzgerald; Michael Trucco; Katie Parker; Sauriyan Sapkota; Matt Biedel; Crystal Balint; Ruth Codd; Kyliegh Curran; Carl Lumbly; Mark Hamill
- Composer: The Newton Brothers
- Country of origin: United States
- Original language: English
- No. of episodes: 8

Production
- Executive producers: Trevor Macy; Mike Flanagan; Michael Fimognari; Emmy Grinwis
- Producers: Kathy Gilroy; Jamie Flanagan
- Production locations: Vancouver, British Columbia; The Bridge Studios, Burnaby, British Columbia
- Cinematography: Michael Fimognari
- Editor: Brett Bachman
- Camera setup: Single-camera
- Running time: 57–77 minutes
- Production company: Intrepid Pictures

Original release
- Network: Netflix
- Release: October 12, 2023

The Fall of the House of Usher is an American gothic horror drama television miniseries created by Mike Flanagan, and based on the 1839 short story and other works by the author Edgar Allan Poe. All eight episodes were released on Netflix on October 12, 2023, each directed by either Flanagan or Michael Fimognari, with the latter also acting as cinematographer for the entire series.

Loosely based on various works by Poe (most prominently the eponymous 1839 short story), the series adapts otherwise unrelated stories and characters by Poe into a single nonlinear narrative set from 1953 to 2023. It recounts both the rise to power of Roderick Usher, the powerful CEO of a corrupt pharmaceutical company, and his sister Madeline, the firm's genius COO, and the events leading to the deaths of all six of Roderick's children. It stars an ensemble cast led by Carla Gugino as the mysterious "Verna" who plagues the Ushers, and Bruce Greenwood and Mary McDonnell as an elderly Roderick and Madeline.

The first two episodes of The Fall of the House of Usher premiered at Fantastic Fest in September 2023 before the Netflix release the following month, and the miniseries counted more than 13 million views in its first two weeks. It was met with positive reviews, with critics praising its production values, directing, and performances (in particular from Gugino, Greenwood, and Mark Hamill), although they were divided on its narrative, notably in relation to the source materials.

== Synopsis ==
In November 2023, Roderick Usher, the CEO of pharmaceutical company Fortunato Pharmaceuticals, loses all six of his children within two weeks. The evening after the final funeral, Roderick invites C. Auguste Dupin, an Assistant United States Attorney who dedicated his career to exposing Fortunato's corruption, to his childhood home, where he tells the true story of his family and unveils the Ushers' darkest secrets.

The series follows two timelines in addition to the conversation between Roderick and Dupin, depicted onscreen when told by Roderick: the first, taking place from 1953 to 1980, recounts Roderick and his twin sister Madeline's youth and subsequent rise to power, while the second follows all of the Ushers during the two weeks leading up to the discussion, revealing the truth behind the deaths of Roderick's children.

== Cast and characters ==
=== Main ===
- Carla Gugino as Verna, a mysterious woman from the Usher twins' past, who takes on various forms, most notably that of a raven, to prey on the Ushers. Verna is an anagram for raven.
- Bruce Greenwood and Zach Gilford as Roderick Usher, Madeline's brother and the corrupt CEO of Fortunato Pharmaceuticals. He is based on the character of same name in "The Fall of the House of Usher", while the company is named after a character in "The Cask of Amontillado". Greenwood portrays Roderick in 2023, while Gilford portrays him in 1979.
  - Graham Verchere as a teenaged Roderick Usher
  - Lincoln Russo as a child Roderick Usher
- Mary McDonnell and Willa Fitzgerald as Madeline Usher, Roderick's sister and the ambitious COO of Fortunato Pharmaceuticals, with a lifelong interest in technological advancements. She is based on the character of same name in "The Fall of the House of Usher". McDonnell portrays the character in 2023, while Fitzgerald portrays her in 1979.
  - Lulu Wilson as a teenaged Madeline Usher
  - Kate Whiddington as a child Madeline Usher
- Henry Thomas as Frederick Usher, Roderick's eldest son and heir to Fortunato, husband to Morella, and father to Lenore. His name comes from the protagonist of "Metzengerstein".
  - William Kosovic as kid Frederick Usher
- Kate Siegel as Camille L'Espanaye, one of Roderick's illegitimate children, and the sharp-tongued public relations head of Fortunato, obsessed with collecting and controlling information. Her name comes from a character in "The Murders in the Rue Morgue".
- Rahul Kohli as Napoleon "Leo" Usher, one of Roderick's illegitimate children, and a prominent video game publisher with a drug addiction. His name comes from a character in "The Spectacles".
- Samantha Sloyan as Tamerlane Usher, Roderick's eldest daughter, and an aspiring entrepreneur working on Goldbug, a brand mixing health products, beauty products, and lifestyle advice. Her name comes from the poem "Tamerlane", while the brand’s name comes from the short story “The Gold-Bug”.
- T'Nia Miller as Victorine LaFourcade, the eldest of Roderick's illegitimate children, and a gifted surgeon hoping for a breakthrough on an experimental heart device. Her name comes from a character in "The Premature Burial".
- Michael Trucco as Rufus Griswold, the former CEO of Fortunato who held the position after Longfellow and before Roderick. The character shares his name with Rufus Wilmot Griswold, a real-life rival of Poe.
- Katie Parker as Annabel Lee, Roderick's first wife and mother of Frederick and Tamerlane. Her name comes from the poem "Annabel Lee".
- Sauriyan Sapkota as Prospero "Perry" Usher, the youngest of Roderick's illegitimate children, who pursues a hedonistic lifestyle. His name comes from a character in "The Masque of the Red Death".
- Matt Biedel as William "Bill-T" Wilson, a fitness influencer, and Tamerlane's husband. His name comes from "William Wilson".
- Crystal Balint as Morella Usher, a former model and actress, Frederick's wife, and Lenore's mother. Her name comes from the character in "Morella".
- Ruth Codd as Juno Usher, Roderick's second, much-younger wife. She is a former drug addict, now addicted to Ligodone, a Fortunato Pharmaceuticals medication.
- Kyliegh Curran as Lenore Usher, Frederick and Morella's daughter. Roderick considers her to be "the best of the Ushers". Lenore is a female character that "died so young" in several of Poe's poems, most notably "Lenore" and "The Raven," believed to be a reference to his wife Virginia, who died of tuberculosis, aged 24.
- Carl Lumbly as Charles Auguste Dupin, the Assistant United States Attorney who wants to bring the Ushers to justice. His name comes from the character C. Auguste Dupin, who appears in several of Poe's short stories.
  - Malcolm Goodwin portrays Dupin in 1979.
- Mark Hamill as Arthur Gordon Pym, the family's attorney and fixer, nicknamed "The Pym Reaper" for his ruthlessness and efficiency. His name comes from the novel The Narrative of Arthur Gordon Pym of Nantucket, which serves as the character's backstory.

=== Recurring ===
- Paola Nuñez as Dr. Alessandra "Ali" Ruiz, Victorine's partner and co-worker Her first name belongs to a character in the only play Poe wrote (but never completed), Politian.
- Igby Rigney as Toby, one of Camille's two close assistants and lovers. His name comes from a character in "Never Bet the Devil Your Head".
- Aya Furukawa as Beth "Tina", Camille's other assistant and lover
- Daniel Jun as Julius, Leo's boyfriend. His name comes from The Journal of Julius Rodman.
- Nicholas Lea as Judge John Neal, who presides over the case of the Ushers. The real-life critic John Neal discovered Poe in 1829.

=== Guest ===
- Annabeth Gish as Eliza Usher, Roderick and Madeline's religious mother who worked as Longfellow's secretary. Her name comes from Poe's mother Eliza Poe.
- Robert Longstreet as William Longfellow, the former CEO of Fortunato. His name comes from the poet and contemporary of Poe Henry Wadsworth Longfellow.
- Sarah-Jane Redmond as Mrs. Longfellow, William's wife
- Molly C. Quinn as Jenny, one of Perry's partners
- JayR Tinaco as Faraj, one of Perry's partners
- Alex Essoe as a court witness who testifies at the Ushers' trial

== Episodes ==
While the first episode's title consists of a phrase from the first line of Poe's poem "The Raven", the last episode bears the poem's title. The other episodes have the same titles as the following short stories by Poe: "The Masque of the Red Death", "The Murders in the Rue Morgue", "The Black Cat", "The Tell-Tale Heart", "The Gold-Bug", and "The Pit and the Pendulum".

| No. | Title | Directed by | Teleplay by | Original release date |
|---|---|---|---|---|
| 1 | "A Midnight Dreary" | Mike Flanagan | Mike Flanagan | October 12, 2023 |
Roderick Usher, the corrupt CEO of Fortunato Pharmaceuticals, has lost all of his children—heir Frederick, entrepreneur Tamerlane, surgeon Victorine, gaming mogul Napoleon (Leo), PR head Camille, and socialite Prospero (Perry)—in a span of two weeks. He attends the funeral of his oldest three (the last ones to die). He sees the ghosts of his dead children and collapses, muttering, "It's time." He invites his nemesis, assistant US Attorney C. Auguste Dupin, to his childhood home to confess his crimes and reveal the reason behind his children's deaths. In 1962, Roderick's mother, Eliza, was buried prematurely after appearing to have died of illness, and dug herself out of her grave to kill her abusive employer, Fortunato CEO William Longfellow, the twins' biological father. In the present, a trial begins to hold the Usher family responsible for the deaths of thousands of people who were taking Fortunato's drug Ligodone and for significantly contributing to the opioid epidemic. Dupin mentions an informant within the family. Roderick recounts a fateful encounter with Verna, a mysterious woman who foretold a life-altering change for the siblings during New Year's Eve 1979.
| 2 | "The Masque of the Red Death" | Mike Flanagan | Emmy Grinwis and Mike Flanagan | October 12, 2023 |
In 1979, Dupin investigates grave exhumations linked to a drug trial. The younger Roderick, living with his sister Madeline, his first wife Annabel Lee, and young children Frederick and Tamerlane, fails a pitch of Ligodone to Fortunato's CEO, Rufus Griswold, who succeeded Longfellow. In the present, Perry, Frederick, and Roderick's lawyer Arthur Pym must deal with environmental concerns involving their properties. When Frederick insults Perry, Perry decides to host a masquerade-themed party at one of the condemned properties to prove his worth, using water from the facility's tanks to signal an orgy. Roderick, suffering from CADASIL, pins hope on Victorine's experimental heart mesh, while Madeline, now Fortunato COO, seeks to create AI using the memories of Frederick's teenage daughter Lenore. Perry invites Frederick's frustrated wife, Morella, to his party, planning to seduce her as revenge for his brother's disrespect to him. Verna arrives at the party in disguise and gives Perry an oblique warning about consequences. The sprinklers' spray turns out to be highly acidic chemical waste, the consequence being death for all but one guest. Verna gives Perry a kiss as he dies.
| 3 | "Murder in the Rue Morgue" | Michael Fimognari | Justina Ireland and Mike Flanagan | October 12, 2023 |
In a flashback, Griswold takes credit for Ligodone, forcing Roderick to accept this in exchange for potentially increasing his influence at Fortunato. In the present, Pym identifies Perry's body and a badly-burned Morella, the only survivor. Roderick confesses to Dupin that he hid the corrosive waste in those tanks to avoid federal regulations; Frederick's negligence in removing those properties resulted in Perry's death. Camille discovers that Victorine's illegal heart mesh tests on animals were unsuccessful. Verna poses as the first human test subject for Victorine, who books the illegal surgery without informing her girlfriend and co-worker Dr. Ali Ruiz. Verna also poses as an escort for Tamerlane's husband, Bill, to fulfill Tamerlane's cuckquean fetish. Leo believes he killed Pluto, the black cat of his partner Julius, in a drug-fueled stupor. Camille encounters Verna posing as a security guard at Victorine's lab, who asks why Camille hates her half-sister since the two are in fact similar. One of the tested chimpanzees mauls Camille to death.
| 4 | "The Black Cat" | Michael Fimognari | Mat Johnson and Mike Flanagan | October 12, 2023 |
In a flashback, Dupin shows Roderick documents with his signature, which Fortunato forged. In the present, Leo adopts a black cat resembling Pluto from Verna to deceive Julius. Camille's death triggers a family crisis as they no longer have a PR leader. Roderick, Madeline, and Pym identify Verna as the culprit, whom Madeline recalls meeting on New Year's of 1980. Pym gives Frederick the locked burner phone Perry gave to Morella for the party; Frederick becomes paranoid that Morella was cheating on him. In an attempt to cope, he asks Leo for drugs. Roderick confides in Madeline about his diagnosis, similar to their mother's. The new Pluto torments Leo amid Julius' concern over his excessive drug use due to grief over his siblings' deaths. Leo brings Verna to take back the cat and accidentally gouges Pluto's eye, with Verna showing the same injuries. He trashes the apartment in search of Pluto, all of it being his hallucinations. Leo then falls to his death from the balcony as the real Pluto reappears.
| 5 | "The Tell-Tale Heart" | Mike Flanagan | Dani Parker | October 12, 2023 |
In a flashback, Roderick, Madeline, and Annabel Lee join forces with Dupin to uncover Fortunato's hidden files. In the present, the surviving Usher children devolve into jealousy over their father's favoritism. Frederick has the hospital discharge Morella into his care. Victorine admits that she forged Ali's signature to hurry Verna's surgery. Dupin admits he lied about the informant's existence to pit the family against each other. After an argument, Tamerlane and Bill break up. Roderick meets Victorine for the heart mesh but she is distracted by a ticking noise. Her memory then comes back: after Ali said she was going to reveal the corruption behind the Usher family and the heart mesh trial, Victorine threw a bookend at her head, killing her. Desperate, she used the heart mesh on a dead Ali and was driven to madness by the mesh's chirping. Upon realizing this, Victorine commits suicide in front of her father.
| 6 | "Goldbug" | Mike Flanagan | Rebecca Leigh Klingel and Mike Flanagan | October 12, 2023 |
In the present, Tamerlane deals with hallucinations from insomnia and her breakup with Bill as she prepares to launch her wellness package Goldbug. Madeline tries to convince Roderick that Verna is a threat after his children's mounting death count, trying to remind him of their deal with her back in 1980, though Roderick is in denial. She also pushes her scientists to develop an AI for consciousness mapping. Pym uncovers Verna's links to prominent families impossibly dating back hundreds of years. Morella begins speaking, leading Frederick to drug her back into silence, still believing she had been unfaithful. Lenore grows concerned when her father does not bring the specialists he'd promised for her mother. At Goldbug's launch, Tamerlane is rattled by hallucinations of Verna and a sex tape of her, Bill, and an escort. She accidentally injures Roderick's wife Juno and Madeline spots Verna, who turns to dust before her eyes. At home, Verna taunts Tamerlane through mirrors, which she smashes until the shards of glass impale and kill her.
| 7 | "The Pit and the Pendulum" | Michael Fimognari | Jamie Flanagan and Mike Flanagan | October 12, 2023 |
In 1979, Roderick betrays Dupin at the court hearing to take down Fortunato, saving the company and earning its gratitude. Disappointed, his wife Annabel Lee leaves him. In the present, Madeline tries to convince Pym to elect her as CEO after Roderick is pushed out due to his illness; she wishes to pivot Fortunato to a tech company focusing on AI. Frederick—now hooked on Leo's cocaine—continues to torture Morella. Roderick refuses Juno's request to get off Ligodone, admitting that he only married her because he was fascinated by her body's affinity for the drug; she leaves him. Frederick enters the building where Perry died prior to it being bulldozed. He snorts cocaine and collapses; Verna reveals that she pushed him to add Morella's paralytics to the cocaine. As the demolition begins, she explains that she would have used an easier method of death but chose this because of his decision to torture Morella. The collapsing infrastructure forms a pendulum that bisects Frederick; he can see and feel it happening. Lenore rescues her mother and calls the police. Thinking that she can save herself if Roderick dies, Madeline convinces him to overdose on Ligodone. Verna, however, does not allow him to die yet.
| 8 | "The Raven" | Michael Fimognari | Mike Flanagan and Kiele Sanchez | October 12, 2023 |
In 1979, Griswold makes Roderick his right-hand man after he saves the company at the court hearing. On New Year's Eve, Madeline and Roderick serve Griswold poisoned amontillado and wall him into the basement, murdering him. They plan to frame him and have Roderick replace him on the board, taking over Fortunato. The siblings spend time at Verna's bar to establish an alibi and are talked into making a deal with her for wealth and power; in exchange, the entire Usher bloodline will die right before the siblings, who will die together. In the present, Verna offers Pym a deal of immunity for his crimes (detailed in Camille's files), but he refuses and accepts the consequences. Roderick has a vision of Annabel Lee's ghost at their children's funeral, and she laments that he starved them of love and affection in favor of money and greed. Madeline conspires with Pym to oust and replace Roderick as Fortunato CEO. Before granting Lenore a peaceful death, Verna reveals that her mother will recover and form a beneficent foundation in her name. Verna had then instructed Roderick to call Dupin to confess. Before doing so, Roderick had invited Madeline to the old house, where he killed her and replaced her eyes with sapphires to give her a queenly send-off. After Roderick finishes confessing to Dupin, a blind and deranged Madeline emerges from the basement, revealed to have only appeared dead like their mother, and strangles Roderick. Dupin escapes just as the house collapses, and he sees Verna perched atop the rubble. Juno inherits and dissolves Fortunato, creating a drug rehab foundation. Pym is arrested and Dupin retires. Verna leaves a token on each Usher grave.

== Production ==
In October 2021, Netflix announced that Mike Flanagan was developing a new miniseries based on "The Fall of the House of Usher" and other works by Edgar Allan Poe. On December 9, 2021, Frank Langella, Carla Gugino, Mary McDonnell, Carl Lumbly, and Mark Hamill were cast. Samantha Sloyan, Rahul Kohli, Henry Thomas, T'Nia Miller, Kate Siegel, Sauriyan Sapkota, Zach Gilford, Katie Parker, Michael Trucco, Malcolm Goodwin, Crystal Balint, Kyleigh Curran, Paola Nuñez, Aya Furukawa, Matt Biedel, Daniel Jun, Ruth Codd, Robert Longstreet, Annabeth Gish, and Igby Rigney were cast the next day. The show may be partially based on the Sackler family who owned Purdue Pharma.

In April 2022, Langella was fired from the series after a misconduct investigation, with his role set to be recast. By the end of the month, Bruce Greenwood was cast to replace Langella.

Filming began on January 31, 2022, in Vancouver, Canada, and wrapped on July 9, 2022.

== Release ==
The first two episodes debuted at Fantastic Fest in September 2023, as well as a pre-screening at Flanagan's alma mater, Towson University. The series was released on Netflix on October 12, 2023.

== Reception ==
=== Viewership ===
The Fall of the House of Usher was viewed 6 million times on its debut week, making it the most-watched English-language fiction program on Netflix that week, and third most-watched overall after the French-language series Lupin and the documentary series Beckham. The next week, it was the second most-watched series on Netflix, with 7.9 million views.

=== Critical response ===
On the review aggregator website Rotten Tomatoes, 91% of 116 critics' reviews are positive, with an average rating of 7.9/10. The website's consensus reads: "Presenting vintage Poe stories filtered through Mike Flanagan's deliciously dark lens, The Fall of the House of Usher will get a rise out of horror fans." Metacritic, which uses a weighted average, assigned the show a score of 73 out of 100, based on 33 critics, indicating "generally favorable reviews". Its cast, production values, directing and editing were singled out, with the performances of Carla Gugino, Bruce Greenwood, and Mark Hamill being singled out by a number of critics.

Ben Travers of IndieWire gave the series a B− and wrote, "As the absurdly wealthy destroy our only planet, our innocent pleasures, and our very lives, even a blunt, overextended allegory can deliver visceral satisfactions. Arguing billionaires should not exist has rarely felt so Biblical." Reviewing the series for San Francisco Chronicle, G. Allen Johnson gave a rating of 3/4 and said, "The tonal difference between the books and the series? The makers of The Fall of the House of Usher are having way more fun."

Olly Dyche of MovieWeb stated: "The series oozes with [Flanagan]'s usual style of creepy imagery, effective jump scares, ample tension, and complex emotions. But perhaps what The Fall of the House of Usher does better than most horror series is its focus on character drama, and the deeply engaging mystery that will constantly ask more questions than it answers until the very end. The performances, as with Flanagan's usual projects, are all flawless, with Carla Gugino stealing the show." Perri Nemiroff of Collider stated that The Fall of the House of Usher was "Another masterful series from Mike Flanagan", "A true dream for fans of Edgar Allan Poe's work" and "an expertly crafted combination of Poe-penned stories brought to screen via a slew of deliciously diabolical performances." Brian Tallerico of RogerEbert.com stated that the series "can sometimes feel simultaneously overcrowded in its cramming in of various sources and narratively thin at the same time, but Mike Flanagan's craft and his assemblage of returning performers keep this pendulum swinging through eight grisly episodes."

While other aspects were widely praised, the narrative received some criticism: Aja Romano of Vox found it to be unable to blend its various source materials smoothly, and to lack "the most central element of all Poe's works: Passion. The characters of Usher may be dying like they're in a gothic horror, but they're not living like it [...] There's nothing of Poe's lingering mysteries, the giant unresolved questions of internal motivations and dreamlike logic that hang over his stories and their subjects". Ed Power of The Telegraph called it "an over-stuffed and under-cooked horror bore", stating that "the characters are too bluntly drawn to elicit any of the sympathy we felt for the tragically awful Roys. The opiate plot feels tacked on, if not opportunistic. Nor does it help that the story is gory rather than frightening."

=== Accolades ===
| Year | Award | Category | Nominee(s) | Result | Ref. |
|---|---|---|---|---|---|
| 2024 | Black Reel Awards | Outstanding Lead Performance in a TV Movie/Limited Series | Carl Lumbly | Nominated | |
| 2024 | Critics' Choice Awards | Best Lead Actress in a Limited Series or Movie Made for Television | Carla Gugino | Nominated | |
| 2024 | Critics' Choice Awards | Best Supporting Actress in a Limited Series or Movie Made for Television | Willa Fitzgerald | Nominated | |
| 2024 | Critics' Choice Awards | Best Supporting Actress in a Limited Series or Movie Made for Television | Mary McDonnell | Nominated | |
| 2024 | Critics' Choice Super Awards | Best Horror Series, Limited Series or Made-for-TV Movie | The Fall of the House of Usher | Nominated | |
| 2024 | Critics' Choice Super Awards | Best Actor in a Horror Series, Limited Series or Made-for-TV Movie | Zach Gilford | Nominated | |
| 2024 | Critics' Choice Super Awards | Best Actor in a Horror Series, Limited Series or Made-for-TV Movie | Bruce Greenwood | Nominated | |
| 2024 | Critics' Choice Super Awards | Best Actress in a Horror Series, Limited Series or Made-for-TV Movie | Carla Gugino | Nominated | |
| 2024 | Critics' Choice Super Awards | Best Villain in a Series, Limited Series or Made-for-TV Movie | Carla Gugino | Nominated | |
| 2024 | Critics' Choice Super Awards | Best Villain in a Series, Limited Series or Made-for-TV Movie | Mary McDonnell | Nominated | |
| 2024 | GLAAD Media Awards | Outstanding Limited or Anthology Series | The Fall of the House of Usher | Nominated | |
| 2024 | Television Critics Association Awards | Outstanding Achievement in Movies, Miniseries and Specials | The Fall of the House of Usher | Nominated | |
| 2025 | Saturn Awards | Best Television Presentation | The Fall of the House of Usher | Nominated | |
| 2025 | Saturn Awards | Best Supporting Actor in a Television Series | Henry Thomas | Nominated | |
| 2025 | Saturn Awards | Best Guest Star in a Television Series | Mark Hamill | Won | |
