= Poems by Edgar Allan Poe =

List of poems by the American writer

This article lists all known poems by American author and critic Edgar Allan Poe (January 19, 1809 – October 7, 1849), listed alphabetically with the date of their authorship in parentheses.

== An Acrostic (1829) ==
An unpublished 9-line poem written circa 1829 for Poe's cousin Elizabeth Rebecca Herring (the acrostic is her first name, spelled out by the first letter of each line). It was never published in Poe's lifetime. James H. Whitty discovered the poem and included it in his 1911 anthology of Poe's works under the title "From an Album". It was also published in Thomas Ollive Mabbott's definitive Collected Works of Edgar Allan Poe in 1969 as "An Acrostic".

The poem mentions "Endymion", possibly referring to an 1818 poem by John Keats with that name. The "L. E. L." in the third line may be Letitia Elizabeth Landon, an English artist known for signing her work with those initials. "Zantippe" in line four is actually Xanthippe, wife of Socrates. The spelling of the name was changed to fit the acrostic.

== Al Aaraaf (1829) ==
This poem is based on stories from the Quran, and tells of the afterlife in the place called Al Aaraaf. Poe included it as the major poem in his 1829 collection Al Aaraaf, Tamerlane, and Minor Poems.

== Alone (1829) ==
"Alone" by Edgar Allan Poe

"Alone" is a 22-line poem originally written in 1829, and left untitled and unpublished during Poe's lifetime. The original manuscript was signed "E. A. Poe" and dated March 17, 1829. In February of that year, Poe's foster mother Frances Allan had died. In September 1875, the poem, which had been in the possession of a family in Baltimore, was published with its title in Scribner's Monthly. The editor, E. L. Didier, also reproduced a facsimile of the manuscript, though he admitted he added the date himself. The poem is now often included in anthologies.

"Alone" is often interpreted as autobiographical, expressing the author's feelings of isolation and inner torment. Poet Daniel Hoffman believed "Alone" was evidence that "Poe really was a haunted man". The poem, however, is an introspective about Poe's youth, written when he was only 20 years old.

== Annabel Lee (1849) ==
The last complete poem written by Poe, it was published shortly after his death in 1849. The speaker of the poem talks about a lost love, Annabel Lee, and may have been based on Poe's own relationship with his wife Virginia, though that is disputed.

== The Bells (1848) ==
First published after Poe's death, "The Bells" is a heavily onomatopoeic poem known for its repetition.

== Beloved Physician (1847) ==
"The Beloved Physician" was written around April 1847 for Mary-Louise Shew, a nurse who also inspired Poe's more famous poem, "The Bells". The poem was originally ten stanzas long, although a version with nine stanzas was supposedly prepared by Poe for publication . It was never printed during his lifetime, and it now appears to be lost. Shew was able to recall about a tenth of a poem in a letter to editor John W. Ingham in 1875; these fragments were published in 1909, and appear to be all that remains of the piece.

== Bridal Ballad (1837) ==
First published simply as "Ballad" in the January 1837 edition of the Southern Literary Messenger, it was later retitled as "Bridal Ballad" when it was printed in the July 31, 1841 edition of the Saturday Evening Post. The poem is unusual for Poe because it is written in the voice of a woman, specifically a recently married bride. Despite her reassurances that she is "happy," the poem has a somber tone as it recounts a previous love who has died. In marrying, she has broken her vow to this previous lover to love him eternally.

Poe biographer Daniel Hoffman says that "Bridal Ballad" is guilty of "one of the most unfortunate rhymes in American poetry this side of Thomas Holley Chivers". He is referring to the name of the bride's dead lover, "D'Elormie", which he calls "patently a forced rhyme" for "o'er me" and "before me" in the previous lines. Aldous Huxley made the same observation, calling the rhyme "ludicrous" and "horribly vulgar".

The poem is one of the few works by Poe to be written in the voice of a woman. See also the humorous tale "A Predicament".

== The City in the Sea (1831) ==
In its first publication in 1831, "The City in the Sea" was published as "The Doomed City" before being renamed in 1845. It presents a personified Death sitting on the throne of a "strange city."

== The Coliseum (1833) ==
"The Coliseum" explores Rome as a past glory that still exists in imagination. Poe submitted the poem to a contest sponsored by the Baltimore Saturday Visiter, which offered a prize of $25 to the winner. The judges chose a poem submitted by editor John Hill Hewitt under the pseudonym "Henry Wilton". Poe was outraged by what he considered nepotism; Hewitt later claimed that the two had a fistfight in the streets of Baltimore, though no evidence proves the event.

Despite the controversy, "The Coliseum" was published by the Visiter in its October 26, 1833, issue. It was later incorporated into Poe's unfinished drama Politian.

In a July 1844 letter to fellow author James Russell Lowell, Poe put "The Coliseum" as one of his six best poems.

== The Conqueror Worm (1843) ==
First published as a separate poem in 1843, "The Conqueror Worm" was later incorporated into the text of Poe's short story "Ligeia". The poem seems to imply that all life is a worthless drama that inevitably leads to death.

== Deep in Earth (1847) ==
"Deep in Earth" is a couplet, presumably part of an unfinished poem Poe was writing in 1847. In January of that year, Poe's wife Virginia had died in New York of tuberculosis. It is assumed that the poem was inspired by her death. It is difficult to discern, however, if Poe had intended the completed poem to be published or if it was personal.

Poe scribbled the couplet onto a manuscript copy of his poem "Eulalie". That poem seems autobiographical, referring to his joy upon marriage. The significance of the couplet implies that he has gone back into a state of loneliness similar to before his marriage. It has been found that the second line of Poe's couplet was adapted from "Zarifa", a poem by Frances Osgood.

== The Divine Right of Kings (1845) ==
"The Divine Right of Kings" is attributed to Edgar Allan Poe, though his authorship is not proven. It appeared in Graham's Magazine in October 1845. The "King" of the title is Ellen King, possibly representing Frances Sargent Osgood, to whom the writer pledges his devotion. It was first identified as Poe's in an article on November 21, 1915, using the poem's signature of "P." as evidence.

== A Dream (1827) ==
"A Dream" by Edgar Allan Poe

"A Dream" is a lyric poem that first appeared without a title in Tamerlane and Other Poems in 1827. The narrator's "dream of joy departed" causes him to compare and contrast dream and "broken-hearted" reality. Its title was attached when it was published in Al Aaraaf, Tamerlane, and Minor Poems in 1829.

== A Dream Within a Dream (1849) ==
"A Dream Within a Dream" by Edgar Allan Poe

"A Dream Within a Dream" was first published in 1849, the year of Poe's death, and asks if all life is really a dream.

== Dream-Land (1844) ==
First published in the June 1844 issue of Graham's Magazine, "Dream-Land" (also called "Dreamland") was the only poem Poe published that year. It was quickly republished in a June 1845 edition of the Broadway Journal.

This lyric poem consists of five stanzas, with the first and last being nearly identical. The dream-voyager arrives in a place beyond time and space and decides to stay there. This place is odd yet majestic, with "mountains toppling evermore into seas without a shore". Even so, it is a "peaceful, soothing region" and is a hidden treasure like El Dorado. Poe biographer Arthur Hobson Quinn called it "one of [Poe's] finest creations", with each phrase contributing to one effect: a human traveler wandering between life and death.

The eighth line of the poem is typically pushed slightly to the left of the other lines' indentation.

== Eldorado (1848) ==
"Eldorado" by Edgar Allan Poe

A short poem referencing the mythical El Dorado. A traveler asks a "shade" where to find the legendary city of gold and is told to "ride, boldly ride."

== Elizabeth (1829) ==
Believed to have been written in 1829, "Elizabeth" was never published in Poe's lifetime. It was written for his Baltimore cousin, Elizabeth Rebecca Herring. Poe also wrote "An Acrostic" to her as well as the poem that would become "To F——s S. O——d."

== Enigma (1833) ==
First printed in the February 2, 1833, issue of the Baltimore Saturday Visiter, "Enigma" is a riddle that hints at 11 authors. Line two, for example, references Homer and the ninth refers to Alexander Pope. It was signed only with "P.", though Thomas Ollive Mabbott attributed the poem to Poe – and solved the riddles. See the page on eapoe.org for more.

== An Enigma (1848) ==
A riddle poem in a modified sonnet form, "An Enigma" was published in March 1848 in the Union Magazine of Literature and Art under its original simple title "Sonnet." Its new title was attached by Rufus Wilmot Griswold. Its lines conceal an anagram with the name Sarah Anna Lewis (also known as "Stella"). Lewis was an amateur poet who met Poe shortly after the death of his wife Virginia while he lived in Fordham, New York. Lewis's husband paid Poe $100 to write a review of Sarah's work. That review appeared in the September 1848 issue of the Southern Literary Messenger. Marie Louise Shew (Virginia's one-time volunteer nurse, of sorts) later said that Poe called Lewis a "fat, gaudily-dressed woman." Poe's biographer, Arthur Hobson Quinn, called "An Enigma" "one of Poe's feeblest poems".

== Epigram for Wall Street (1845) ==
Printed in the New York Evening Mirror on January 23, 1845, the poem is generally accepted as being written by Poe, though it was published anonymously. The title neglected to capitalize "street." The humorous poem of four rhyming couplets tells savvy people interested in gaining wealth to avoid investments and banks. Instead, it suggests, fold your money in half, thereby doubling it.

== Eulalie (1843) ==
"Eulalie" was first published in 1845 in American Review: A Whig Journal and is about a man who overcomes his sadness by marrying the beautiful Eulalie.

== Evangeline (1848) ==
"Evangeline" was included at the end of Poe's 1848 essay "The Rationale of Verse." It was first published in the November 1848 issue of the Southern Literary Messenger.

== Evening Star (1827) ==
This lyric poem by Poe was first collected in Tamerlane and Other Poems early in Poe's career in 1827. In the poem, a stargazer thinks all the stars he sees look cold, except for one "Proud Evening Star" which looks warm with a "distant fire" the other stars lack. The poem was influenced by Thomas Moore's poem "While Gazing on the Moon's Light".

The poem was not included in Poe's second poetry collection, Al Aaraaf, Tamerlane, and Minor Poems, and was never re-printed during his lifetime.

"Evening Star" was adapted by choral composer Jonathan Adams into his Three Songs from Edgar Allan Poe in 1993.

== Fairy-Land (1829) ==
Originally titled "Heaven," "Fairy-Land" was written while Poe was at the United States Military Academy at West Point. Poe first offered the poem to Nathaniel Parker Willis, who wrote in an edition of "The Editor's Table" of the American Monthly of how he threw the submission into the fire and joyfully watched it burn. Nonetheless, it was soon published in the September 1829 issue of The Yankee and Boston Literary Gazette. The journal's editor John Neal introduced the poem and others by Poe as "nonsense". He did, however, admit that the work showed great promise in the author. His introduction read, "If E. A. P. of Baltimore — whose lines about 'Heaven,' though he professes to regard them as altogether superior to any thing in the whole range of American poetry, save two or three trifles referred to, are, though nonsense, rather exquisite nonsense — would but do himself justice, might make a beautiful and perhaps magnificent poem. There is a good deal to justify such a hope." It was first collected in Al Aaraaf, Tamerlane, and Minor Poems in 1829. In that collection, Poe dedicated "Tamerlane" to Neal.

Robert Pinsky, who held the title of Poet Laureate of the United States from 1997 to 2000, said "Fairy-Land" was one of his favorite poems.

== Fanny (1833) ==
First published in the Baltimore Saturday Visiter on May 18, 1833, the poem laments the death of a young love. It was originally signed only as "TAMERLANE."

== For Annie (1849) ==
"For Annie" was written for Nancy L. (Heywood) Richmond (whom Poe called Annie) of Westford, Massachusetts. Richmond was married to Charles B. Richmond of Lowell, Massachusetts, and Poe developed a strong platonic, though complicated, relationship with her. It was at Nancy's (Heywood) family farm in Westford, Massachusetts that Poe would stay, at the invitation of the Lowell couple, while lecturing in Lowell. It was here that the relationship developed. He even wrote to her of purchasing a "cottage" in Westford just to be closer to her and her family. The poem was first set to be published on April 28, 1849 in the journal Flag of our Union, which Poe said was a "paper for which sheer necessity compels me to write." Fearing its publication there would consign it "to the tomb of the Capulets," he sent it to Nathaniel Parker Willis for publication in the Home Journal on the same day as Flag of Our Union. The poem talks about an illness from which Richmond helped Poe recover. It speaks about "the fever called 'Living'" that has been conquered, ending his "moaning and groaning" and his "sighing and sobbing." In a letter dated March 23, 1849, Poe sent the poem he wrote to Richmond saying, "I think the lines 'For Annie' (those I now send) much the best I have ever written."

Nancy Richmond would officially change her name to Annie after her husband's death in 1873. A large Granite Marker was erected for Poe at the historic Heywood home in Westford, Massachusetts, where he stayed. Annie L. Richmond is buried in a Lowell, Massachusetts, cemetery with her husband Charles.

== The Happiest Day (1827) ==
"The Happiest Day", or "The Happiest Day, the Happiest Hour", is a six-quatrain poem. It was first published as part of Poe's first collection Tamerlane and Other Poems in 1827. Poe may have written it while serving in the army. The poem discusses a self-pitying loss of youth, though it was written when Poe was about 19.

A nearly identical poem called "Original" written by Poe's brother William Henry Leonard Poe was first published in the September 15, 1827 issue of the North American. It is believed Poe wrote the poem and sent it to his brother, who then sent it to the magazine. T. O. Mabbott felt that the rather tepid value of this slightly edited version of the poem suggests that they were made by William Henry, though perhaps with Edgar's approval.

== Hymn (1835) ==
This 16-line poem was sung by the title character in Poe's short story Morella, first published in April 1835 in the Southern Literary Messenger. It was later published as a stand-alone poem as "A Catholic Hymn" in the August 16, 1845 issue of the Broadway Journal. The poem addresses the Mother of God, thanking her for hearing her prayers and pleading for a bright future. When it was included in the collection The Raven and Other Poems it was lumped into one large stanza. In a copy of that collection he sent to Sarah Helen Whitman, Poe crossed out the word "Catholic."

Choral composer Jonathan Adams included "Hymn" as part of his Three Songs from Edgar Allan Poe written for chorus and piano in 1993.

== Imitation (1827) ==
The poem "Imitation" was first published in Poe's early collection Tamerlane and Other Poems. The 20-line poem is made up of rhymed couplets where the speaker likens his youth to a dream as his reality becomes more and more difficult. It has been considered potentially autobiographical, written during deepening strains in Poe's relationship with his foster-father John Allan.

After several revisions, this poem evolved into the poem "A Dream Within a Dream".

== Impromptu. To Kate Carol (1845) ==
Kate Carol was a pseudonym for Frances Sargent Osgood, a woman with whom Poe exchanged love notes published in journals. Poe was married at the time, yet his friendship with Osgood was very public. This four-line poem, written with an almost juvenile tone, compares the woman's beautiful thoughts with her beautiful eyes.

The poem, which consists of four lines, was published in the Broadway Journal on April 26, 1845. It was unsigned but Poe biographer and critic T. O. Mabbott assigns it as Poe's without hesitation. Osgood copied the poem and gave it to her friend Elizabeth Oakes Smith with the title "To the Sinless Child." This copy is now preserved in the library of the University of Virginia.

== Israfel (1831) ==
Written while Poe was at West Point, "Israfel" is a poem in eight stanzas of varying lengths that was first published in April 1831 in Poems of Edgar A. Poe. It was re-worked and republished for the August 1836 issue of the Southern Literary Messenger. In an introduction to the poem, Poe says that Israfel is described in the Quran as an angel whose heart is a lute and who has "the sweetest voice of all God's creatures." His song quiets the stars, the poem says, while the Earth-bound poet is limited in his own "music". Poe's friend Thomas Holley Chivers said "Israfil" comes the closest to matching Poe's ideal of the art of poetry.

"Israfel" varies in meter; however, it contains mostly iambic feet, complemented by end rhyme in which several of the lines in each stanza rhyme together. Poe also uses frequent alliteration within each line in any given stanza.

The poem contains a few references to figures from Islamic tradition. While Poe attributes the introductory quotation about Israfel to the Quran, the name "Israfel" does not appear in the Quran itself; instead, mention is repeatedly made of an unnamed trumpet-angel, traditionally assumed to represent the archangel Israfil: "And the trumpet shall be blown, so all those that are in the heavens and all those that are in the earth shall swoon, except such as Allah please; then it shall be blown again, then lo! they shall stand up awaiting." (Quran 39:68 ^{(Translated by Shakir)}). The more direct inspiration for Poe's introductory quotation comes from Thomas Moore's Lalla Rookh, which itself footnotes George Sale's introduction to his 1734 translation of the Quran: "The angel Israfil, who has the most melodious voice of all God's creatures."

The poem details the beauty of the unearthly song of Israfil, as stars and other heavenly bodies stand transfixed in muted silence. Poe further alludes to Islam by referencing a Houri as another heavenly entity entrapped amidst the majesty of Israfil's lyre. It is likely that such Islamic references were used to give the work an exotic feel. The poem concludes with the author wondering as to whether if their places traded, he could craft a bolder melody from his lyre than Israfil. The poem parallels Samuel Taylor Coleridge's "Kubla Khan" in the inspiring yet ultimately unfulfilling song of a heavenly muse.

Hervey Allen likened Poe himself to Israfil and titled his 1934 biography Israfel: The Life and Times of Edgar Allan Poe. The poem was set to music by Oliver King in 1890 and by Leonard Bernstein in his Songfest of 1977.

== The Lake (1827) ==
First appearing simply as "The Lake" in Poe's 1827 collection Tamerlane and Other Poems, the amended title appeared in 1829 collected in Al Aaraaf, Tamerlane, and Minor Poems. The poem is a celebration of loneliness and the thoughts inspired by a remote lake. For the 1845 collection The Raven and Other Poems, Poe reworked the first line ("In youth's spring, it was my lot") to "In spring of youth it was my lot."

== Lenore (1843) ==
"Lenore" discusses proper decorum in the wake of the death of a young woman. It began as a different poem, "A Pæan".

== Lines on Ale (1848) ==
A simple 8-line poem, "Lines on Ale" may have been written by Poe to pay his drinking bill. It was discovered at the Washington Tavern in Lowell, Massachusetts where it was written. The original copy hung on the wall of the tavern until about 1920.

The poem depicts a joyful narrator who carelessly lets time go by as he asks for another drink of ale, saying he will drain another glass. He enjoys the "hilarious visions" and "queerest fancies" that enter his brain while drinking.

== Lines on Joe Locke ==
"Lines on Joe Locke" was a short, two-stanza poem written to make fun of a commanding officer during Poe's time at West Point. Poe was known for his funny verses on staff and faculty at the academy. Lieutenant Locke was either generally not well-liked, or Poe had a more personal vendetta with him. The poem teases that Locke "was never known to lie" in bed while roll was being called, and he was "well known to report" (i.e. cite cadets for discipline purposes).

== O, Tempora! O, Mores! (1825?) ==
Poe's original manuscript of "O, Tempora! O, Mores!" was lost. It was first printed by Eugene L. Didier in his own No Name Magazine in October 1889.

This poem, mostly a sarcastic jab at a clerk named Pitts, starts out with the words "O, Times! O, Manners!" (an English translation of "O, Tempora! O, Mores!"). This phrase, which is commonly used to criticize present-day customs and attitudes, helps illustrate Poe's opinion that many men and politicians (during his lifetime) act as if they have no manners.

== A Pæan (1831) ==
"A Pæan" is the original title of the poem that would become "Lenore". It was first published as part of an early collection in 1831 with only 11 quatrains and it did not mention the name Lenore. The name was not added until it was published as "Lenore" in February 1843 in The Pioneer. This original version of the poem is so dissimilar from "Lenore" that it is often considered an entirely different poem. Both are usually collected separately in anthologies.

== Poetry (1824) ==
This poem, most likely incomplete, was never printed in Poe's lifetime. Its two lines were found written on a page of some of John Allan's financial records. This is the earliest surviving manuscript in Poe's own hand.

== Romance (1829) ==
"Romance" first appeared as "Preface" in the 1829 collection Al Aaraaf, Tamerlane, and Minor Poems, then in 1831 as "Introduction" in Poems by Edgar A. Poe. It took the title "Romance" in the February 25, 1843 issue of the Philadelphia Saturday Museum. The early versions made some allusion to alcohol with lines like "drunkenness of the soul" and "the glories of the bowl". In the poem, the speaker refers to some exotic bird that has been with him his whole life. He also says, "I could not love except where Death / Was mingling his with Beauty's breath", a line often termed autobiographical as many of the women in Poe's love life were ill (an early love Jane Stanard died of tuberculosis, as did his wife Virginia; also, his later love Sarah Helen Whitman had a weak heart, etc.).

== Serenade (1833) ==
This serenade is directed at the beauty of untouched nature, as well as an unnamed lover. It was first printed in the April 20, 1833, issue of the Baltimore Saturday Visiter with the name "E. A. Poe." The poem was never collected in any of Poe's anthologies during his lifetime and was re-discovered by John C. French in 1917. This poem contains extensive examples of allusions from Greek mythology to strengthen the themes of "the beauty of untouched nature."

== Silence (1839) ==
Not to be confused with Poe's short story "Silence: A Fable", "Silence – A Sonnet" was first published on January 4, 1840, in the Philadelphia Saturday Courier. After some revision, it was republished in the Broadway Journal on July 26, 1845. The poem compares the sea and the shore to the body and the soul. There is a death of the body that is silence, the speaker says, that should not be mourned. He does, however, warn against the silent death of the soul.

== The Sleeper (1831) ==
The poem that would become "The Sleeper" went through many revised versions. First, in the 1831 collection Poems of Edgar A. Poe, it appeared with 74 lines as "Irene." It was 60 lines when it was printed in the Philadelphia Saturday Courier on May 22, 1841. Poe considered it one of his best compositions, according to a note he sent to fellow author James Russell Lowell in 1844. Like many of Poe's works, the poem focuses on the death of a beautiful woman, a death which the mourning narrator struggles to deal with while considering the nature of death and life. Some lines seem to echo the poem "Christabel" by Samuel Taylor Coleridge, a poet known to have had a heavy influence on Poe's poetry.

Poe praised "The Sleeper" as a "superior" poem. He wrote to an admirer: "In the higher qualities of poetry, it is better than 'The Raven'—but there is not one man in a million who could be brought to agree with me in this opinion."

== Song (1827) ==
"Song" is a ballad-style poem, which was first published in Tamerlane and Other Poems in 1827, the speaker tells of a former love he saw from afar on her wedding day. A blush on her cheek, despite all the happiness around her, displays a hidden shame for having lost the speaker's love.

It is believed to reference Poe's lost teenage love Sarah Elmira Royster, who broke off her engagement with Poe presumably due to her father. She instead married the wealthy Alexander Shelton. If this is the case, Poe was taking poetic license: he was not in Richmond at the time of her wedding.

== Sonnet — To Science (1829) ==
"To Science", or "Sonnet – To Science", is a traditional 14-line English sonnet which says that science is the enemy of the poet because it takes away the mysteries of the world. Poe was concerned with the recent influx of modern science and social science and how it potentially undermined spiritual beliefs.

== Sonnet — To Zante (1837) ==
A Shakespearean sonnet, it was first published in the January 1837 issue of the Southern Literary Messenger. The poem praises the beauty of the island Zante. The last two lines, written in Italian, are also used in Poe's earlier poem "Al Aaraaf."

== Spirits of the Dead (1827) ==
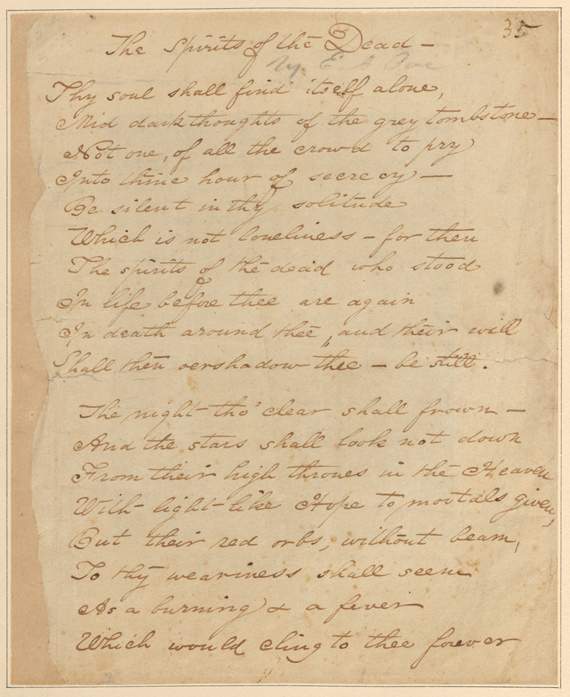
Original manuscript of a revision of "Spirits of the Dead" in Poe's handwriting.

"Spirits of the Dead" was first titled "Visits of the Dead" when it was published in the 1827 collection Tamerlane and Other Poems. The title was changed for the 1829 collection Al Aaraaf, Tamerlane, and Minor Poems. The poem follows a dialogue between a dead speaker and a person visiting his grave. The spirit tells the person that those who one knows in life surround a person in death as well.

== Spiritual Song (1836) ==
A poem, most likely incomplete, that was found in Poe's desk at the offices of the Southern Literary Messenger in 1908. The manuscript is believed to date back to 1836; only three lines are known.

== Stanzas (1827) ==
The title "Stanzas" was assigned to this untitled poem originally printed in Tamerlane and Other Poems in 1827. Another poem with the title "Stanzas" was published in the Graham's Magazine in December 1845 and signed "P." It was attributed to Poe based on a copy owned by Frances Osgood, on which she had pencilled notes.

== To —— (1829) ==
This title refers to two poems carrying the same name. One begins with the lines "The bowers whereat, in dreams, I see." The other begins "Should my early life seem". Both first appeared collected in the 1829 Al Aaraaf, Tamerlane, and Minor Poems. The first, consisting of 12 lines, was reprinted in the September 20, 1845, issue of the Broadway Journal and deals with the speaker's loss which leaves him with "a funeral mind". The poem, despite its many reprintings, never had any significant revisions. The second "To ——" was republished in the December 1829 issue of the Yankee and Boston Literary Gazette after being cut from 40 lines to 13. The narrator of this poem equates breaking with his love as one of several failures.

== To —— (1833) ==
This poem begins "Sleep on, sleep on, another hour" and first appeared in the Baltimore Saturday Visiter on May 11, 1833. It was signed "TAMERLANE" (just as the poem "Fanny," which would be printed in the same periodical one week later) and addressed to an anonymous woman. It is essentially a lullaby.

== To —— —— (1829) ==
This, another of several poems by Poe addressed to an unnamed person, begins with the line "Not long ago, the writer of these lines..." It was later renamed "To Marie Louise" for Marie Louise Shew, a woman who helped Poe's wife as she was dying.

== To F—— (1845) ==
The poem that begins "Beloved! amid the earnest woes..." was published by the Broadway Journal twice in 1845 – once in the April issue then cut down to four lines in the September 6 issue with the more revealing title "To Frances." Referring to Frances S. Osgood, the speaker discusses the chaos and woes of his life, and how they are calmed by dreams of this woman he is addressing.

It was actually a re-working of "To Mary," first published in the Southern Literary Messenger's July 1835 issue. It was also revised into "To One Departed," printed in Graham's Magazine, March 1842, before it was ever addressed to Frances Osgood.

== To F——s S. O——d (1835 / 1845) ==
Originally a poem called "To Elizabeth," dedicated to Poe's cousin Elizabeth Herring and written in an album of hers. It was then published in a revised version in the September 1835 issue of the Southern Literary Messenger as "Lines Written in an Album" and apparently addressed to Eliza White. The poem in this version began, "Eliza! let thy generous heart / From its present pathway part not." White was the then 18-year-old daughter of Thomas Willis White, Poe's employer while he worked at the Messenger. Poe may have considered pursuing a relationship with her before his marriage to his cousin Virginia. One story suggests that Virginia's mother Maria expedited Poe's marriage to Virginia in order to prevent Poe's involvement with Eliza White. T. W. White's apprentice in old age would later say that Poe and Eliza were nothing more than friends.

The poem was renamed to the ambiguous "To —" in the August 1839 issue of Burton's Gentleman's Magazine. With minor revisions, it was finally renamed in honor of Frances Sargent Osgood and published in the 1845 collection The Raven and Other Poems.

The speaker asks the addressee, "Thou wouldst be loved?" and suggest she stay on her current path to achieve that goal.

== To Helen (1848) ==
The original manuscript was sent to Sarah Helen Whitman in 1848. It was published as "To —— —— ——" in the Union Magazine's November issue that year. It became the second of Poe's "To Helen" poems when published as "To Helen" in the October 10, 1849 issue of the New York Daily Tribune.

== To Isaac Lea (1829) ==
"To Isaac Lea" is an unfinished poem, presumed written in May 1829. Only four lines are known to exist. It seems to come from a letter Poe wrote to Isaac Lea, noted as a publishing partner in Philadelphia who was interested in natural history, especially conchology. Poe would attach his name to The Conchologist's First Book ten years later.

== To M—— (1828) ==
Poe toyed with the working title "Alone" before this poem was printed as "To M——" in Al Aaraaf, Tamerlane, and Minor Poems. Poe would use the title "Alone" in 1829.

== To M. L. S—— (1847) ==
Poe wrote this poem to Marie Louise Shew, who helped Poe's wife Virginia as she was dying. The original manuscript was sent directly to her, dated February 14, 1847. A revised version was printed in Home Journal's March 13, 1847, issue.

== To Margaret (1827) ==
"To Margaret" may be an unfinished poem, never published in Poe's lifetime. In the original manuscript, dated 1827, Poe cites the references to other, mostly classical works, from each of his lines. The seven-line poem, according to Poe's notes, refers to John Milton's Paradise Lost, William Shakespeare, and Alexander Pope.

== To Marie Louise (1847) ==
Written in 1847 for Marie Louise Shew, voluntary nurse of Poe's wife Virginia, it was not published until March 1848 in Columbian Magazine as "To —— ——". Poe never pursued a romantic relationship with Shew, and the poem has no strong romantic overtones. It discusses the writer's inability to write, distracted by the thought of "thee". The poem also references an earlier poem of Poe, "Israfel".

== To Miss Louise Olivia Hunter (1847) ==
Never published in Poe's lifetime, it was found as a manuscript dated February 14, 1847. It was included in the 1969 anthology edited by Thomas Olive Mabbott. The "Unknown Poe" anthology edited by Raymond Foye titles it "To Louise Oliver Hunter".

According to the Baltimore Poe Society, Hunter was a college student who entered a poetry contest judged by Poe in 1845. Hunter won, and Poe read her poem at a commencement ceremony on July 11, 1845. Poe's poem may have been written as part of one of Anne Lynch's annual Valentine's Day parties, though the poem contains no romantic or particularly personal overtones. The poem says the narrator attempts to leave but can not, as he is "spelled" by art. He compares this attraction to a snake beguiling a bird from a tree.

== To My Mother (1849) ==
A heartful sonnet written to Poe's mother-in-law and aunt Maria Clemm, "To My Mother" says that the mother of the woman he loved is more important than his own mother. It was first published in July, 1849 in Flag of Our Union. It has alternately been published as "Sonnet to My Mother."

== To Octavia (1827) ==
An unpublished, untitled manuscript, a date at the bottom of the original copy ("May the 1st, 1827") appears to have been written by someone other than Poe. The date is questionable for this reason. The poem, which may be incomplete, tells of the speaker's unrequited love for Octavia being so strong, even "wit, and wine, and friends" can not distract him from it. Every throb of his heart, the narrator says, threatens to make his heart break for Octavia.

== To One in Paradise (1833) ==
"To One in Paradise" was first published without a title as part of the short story "The Visionary" (later renamed "The Assignation"). It evolved into "To Ianthe in Heaven" and then into "To One Beloved" before being named "To One in Paradise" in the February 25, 1843 Saturday Museum.

Modernist poet William Carlos Williams considered "To One in Paradise" one of his most preferred poems.

The poem inspired a song composed by Sir Arthur Sullivan. "To One in Paradise" was published posthumously in 1904 and written for a tenor voice with piano. It is also the basis of the song "To One in Paradise" on the Alan Parsons Project 1976 album Tales of Mystery and Imagination.

== To The River —— (1828) ==
First published in Al Aaraaf, Tamerlane, and Minor Poems, it was also included in the 1845 collection The Raven and Other Poems.

== A Valentine (1846) ==
First published in the New York Evening Mirror's February 21, 1846 issue, "A Valentine" was written specifically for Frances Sargent Osgood, whose name is hidden within the lines of the poem. In its first publication, it had the title "To Her Whose Name Is Written Below." To find the name, take the first letter of the first line, then the second letter of the second line, then the third letter of the third line, and so on. Before its publication, it was presented at a private literary salon at the home of Anne Lynch Botta on February 14, 1846. Though Poe was not in attendance, it was a very public revelation of his affection for Osgood.

== The Valley of Unrest (1831) ==
Though first published as "The Valley Nis" in Poems by Edgar A. Poe in 1831, this poem evolved into the version "The Valley of Unrest" now anthologized. In its original version, the speaker asks if all things lovely are far away, and that the valley is part Satan, part angel, and a large part broken heart. It mentions a woman named "Helen", which may actually refer to Jane Stanard, one of Poe's first loves and the mother of a friend.

The poem was renamed "The Valley of Unrest" for the April 1845 issue of the American Review. This version of the poem is shorter and quite different from its predecessor, and there is no mention of "Helen".

== Chronologically ordered list of Edgar Allan Poe's poems ==
- 1824 Poetry
- 1825? O, Tempora! O, Mores!
- 1827 A Dream
- 1827 Evening Star
- 1827 The Happiest Day
- 1827 Imitation
- 1827 The Lake
- 1827 Song
- 1827 Spirits of the Dead
- 1827 Stanzas
- 1827 Tamerlane
- 1827 To Margaret
- 1827 To Octavia
- 1828 To M——
- 1828 To The River ——
- 1829 An Acrostic
- 1829 Al Aaraaf
- 1829 Alone
- 1829 Elizabeth
- 1829 Fairy-Land
- 1829 Romance
- 1829 Sonnet — To Science
- 1829 To ——
- 1829 To —— ——
- 1829 To Isaac Lea
- 1831 The City in the Sea
- 1831 Israfel
- 1831 A Pæan
- 1831 The Sleeper
- 1831 To Helen
- 1831 The Valley of Unrest
- 1833 The Coliseum
- 1833 Enigma
- 1833 Fanny
- 1833 Serenade
- 1833 To ——
- 1833 To One in Paradise
- 1835 Hymn
- 1836 Spiritual Song
- 1837 Bridal Ballad
- 1837 Sonnet — To Zante
- 1839 The Haunted Palace
- 1839 Silence
- 1843 The Conqueror Worm
- 1843 Eulalie
- 1843 Lenore
- 1844 Dream-Land
- 1845 The Divine Right of Kings
- 1845 Epigram for Wall Street
- 1845 Impromptu. To Kate Carol
- 1845 The Raven
- 1845 To F——
- 1846 A Valentine
- 1847 Beloved Physician
- 1847 Deep in Earth
- 1847 To M. L. S——
- 1847 To Marie Louise
- 1847 To Miss Louise Olivia Hunter
- 1847 Ulalume
- 1848 The Bells
- 1848 Eldorado
- 1848 An Enigma
- 1848 Evangeline
- 1848 Lines on Ale
- 1848 To Helen
- 1849 Annabel Lee
- 1849 A Dream Within A Dream
- 1849 For Annie
- 1849 To My Mother
- 1835/45 To F——s S. O——d
- ? Lines on Joe Locke

== See also ==
- Bibliography of Edgar Allan Poe
- Tamerlane and Other Poems
