= The Assignation (short story) =

- Short story by Edgar Allan Poe
- Country: United States
- Language: English
- Genre: Gothic fiction

Publication
- Published in: Godey's Lady's Book, Southern Literary Messenger, Broadway Journal
- Media type: Print (periodical)
- Publication date: January 1834
- Series: Tales of the Folio Club, Tales of the Grotesque and Arabesque

"The Assignation", originally titled "The Visionary", is a short story by American writer and poet Edgar Allan Poe. It was first published in Godey's Lady's Book in January 1834. The story follows a suicide pact between two lovers through the perspective of an oblivious narrator.

== Plot summary ==
The story, which takes place in Venice, Italy, begins with an unnamed narrator traveling home across the Grand Canal at midnight. During the trip, the narrator and his gondolier are alerted by a loud shriek. After trying to locate the source of the noise, the narrator witnesses the child of the Marchesa Aphrodite—a local noblewoman—slipping from her arms and into the canal.

The Marchesa remains motionless in shock, while Mentoni, her husband, gives halfhearted instructions to rescue the child in between strumming his guitar. Following several unsuccessful efforts, a cloaked foreigner dives into the water, emerging with the child alive shortly afterward. Overjoyed by her child's rescue, the Marchesa whispers into the foreigner's ear, saying that "thou hast conquered" and telling him to meet her one hour after sunrise.

Although previously acquainted with the stranger, the narrator continues to refer to him as "the person of the stranger", regarding him as an outsider to the world. Seeing the stranger looking around for a gondola, the narrator offers him a ride, which he accepts. After the gondola's arrival to his house, the stranger urgently asks the narrator to visit him "very early" the next morning.

Upon entering his acquaintance's residence the following morning, the narrator is astonished by his sheer display of wealth. The stranger proceeds to show the narrator his entire collection of valuables, the last of which is a life-sized portrait of the Marchesa. As the narrator flips through the stranger's copy of The Orfeo, he comes across the original poem "To One in Paradise", which the stranger wrote while crying.

After presenting all of his valuables to the narrator, the stranger invites him for a drink and reflects on the meaninglessness of his material possessions, the purpose of his spirit, and a land of true dreams, to which he is "now rapidly departing".

The stranger quotes "The Exequy" by Henry King before throwing himself upon an ottoman, lying motionless. In the next instant, a horrified page from Mentoni's household announces that the Marchesa was poisoned to death. After failing to rouse the unconscious stranger, the narrator notices that the stranger's drink has turned black from poison and realizes the true meaning behind the Marchesa's earlier words.

== Publication history ==
In 1833, "The Assignation" was submitted to a writing contest sponsored by the Baltimore Saturday Visiter under its original title, "The Visionary". The story was sent in as part of a collection titled Tales of the Folio Club. The judging committee was led by John P. Kennedy, John H. B. Latrobe, and James H. Miller. Though judges granted Poe the Best Prose Tale award specifically for his short story "MS. Found in a Bottle", they also gave high praise to the other short stories he submitted, including "The Visionary". In an October 1833 announcement, they stated: "It would scarcely be doing justice to the author of this collection to say the tale we have chosen is the best of the six offered by him."

Subsequently, "The Assignation" made its first print appearance in the January 1834 edition of Godey's Lady's Book, which was simply titled The Lady's Book at the time. This version of the story was the first to contain an original poem, later titled "To One in Paradise". The poem was later published separately in the Philadelphia Saturday Museum's February 1843 issue within a broader spotlight of Poe's works.

The story was also published in the Southern Literary Messenger in July 1835, which listed the work under "Original Articles of Prose" despite it being revised from earlier versions. The August 1835 edition of the magazine commends Poe for his earlier achievement in the Baltimore Saturday Visiter contest.

In 1840, the Philadelphia firm Lea & Blanchard published Tales of the Grotesque and Arabesque, which included "The Assignation" in Volume II.

Poe revised the title from "The Visionary" to "The Assignation" for its final lifetime publication in the Broadway Journal on June 7, 1845. The story was titled "The Visionary" in all previous publications.

== Analysis ==
The story is widely believed to be based on Thomas Moore's biography of the relationship between Lord Byron and Countess Teresa Guiccioli. Some literary critics argue that it was intended to be a work of satire.
