= Loss of Breath =

1846 story by Edgar Allan Poe

- Short story by Edgar Allan Poe
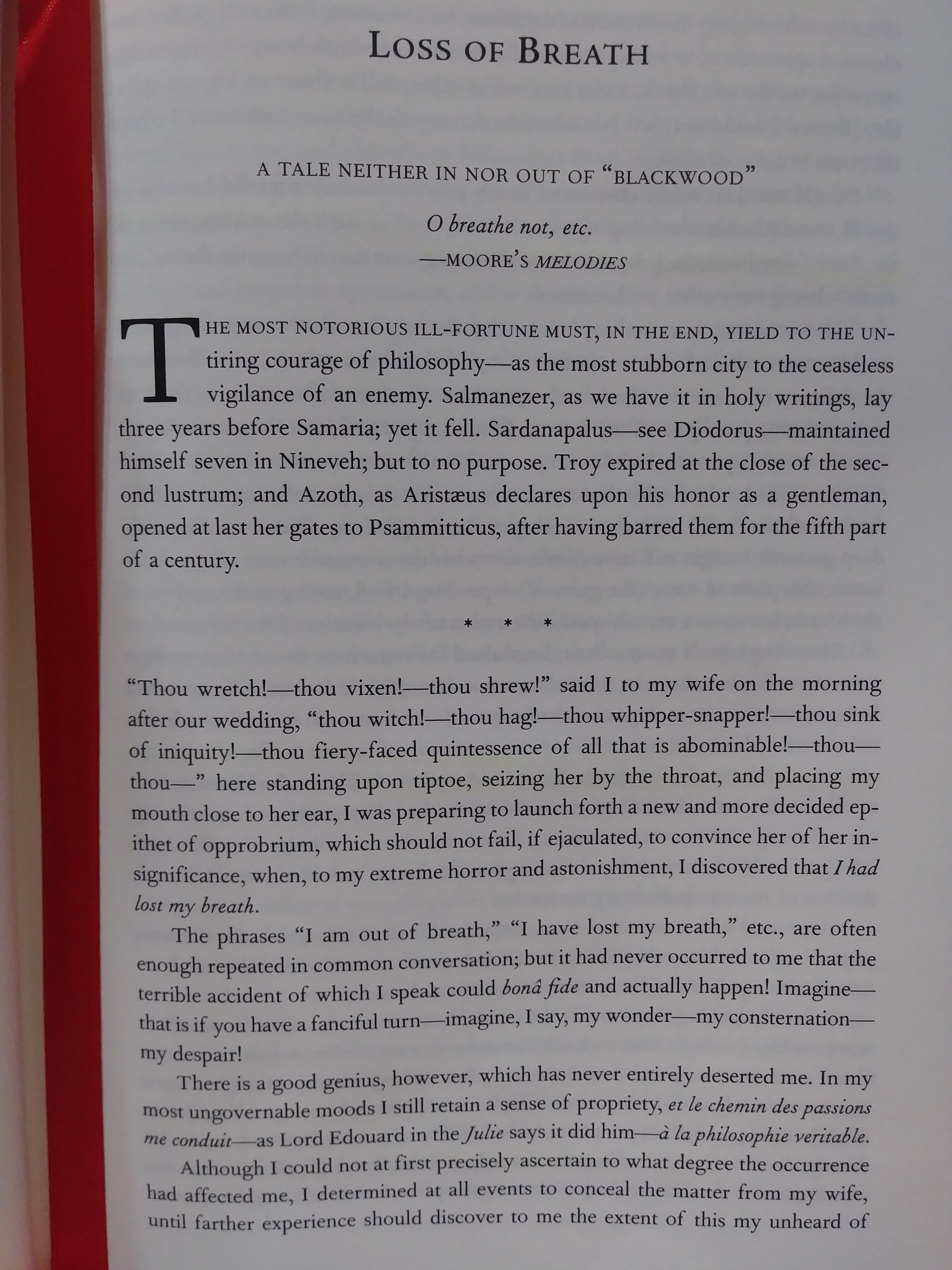
- Country: United States
- Genre: Romantic/Gothic

Publication
- Published in: Broadway Journal
- Publication date: 3 January 1846

"Loss of Breath", also known as "Loss of Breath: A Tale Neither in Nor Out of 'Blackwood' ", is a short story written by American author Edgar Allan Poe under the pseudonym "Littleton Barry". A satirical tale, the story is narrated by Mr. Lackobreath who recounts his attempt to find and reclaim his lost breath, which he had literally misplaced. Throughout his journey, he is repeatedly dismembered and disfigured, falsely assumed to be dead, hanged, locked away, and prematurely interred. The absurd exaggerations may be explained by the fact that the tale was meant to satirize fiction published in the Edinburgh Blackwood Magazine, which was known for its sensational texts.

Inspired by the rapid scientific developments during the nineteenth century and pre-Civil War period, Poe and other writers commonly expressed their ideas and perspectives about the newfound medical culture and practices. As a result, medicine and fiction intertwined during this period. Poe used the characters and plot as devices to convey predominant aspects and concerns regarding medicine in the nineteenth century. Poe also used them to criticize practitioners with an underlying sentiment, suggested to be common during his time. Furthermore, the themes in the story reflect common philosophical movements and beliefs from the nineteenth century, such as transcendentalism and pseudoscience.

An early version of the story was published in 1832 as "A Decided Loss"; it was revised as "Loss of Breath" in 1835, and further revised and printed in The Broadway Journal in 1846.

== Characters ==
- Mr. Lackobreath: The narrator of the work. He is a cautious character and goes to extreme lengths to not reveal his condition, having literally lost his breath. He often refers to philosophical theories and speculates about mortality.
- Mrs. Lackobreath: Making a brief appearance in the commencement of the story, she had just married Mr. Lackobreath the night before. Readers are introduced to her being subjected to verbal abuse from Mr. Lackobreath.
- Mr. Windenough: He is the Lackobreaths' neighbor. When he is first mentioned, the narrator comments on the love notes that Windenough had written to his wife, Mrs. Lackobreath. He is described as being thin and tall. He is encountered in the receiving vault. Like Mr. Lackobreath, he was claimed dead prematurely, and the narrator discovers that the breath he had lost was unintentionally caught by this character.
- Nine travellers: They are travelling in a coach too small for their size and number. Pressed together, a huge man negligently dislocates the limbs and head of Mr. Lackobreath, who cannot be heard to complain. Later concluding that he is deceased, the travellers expressed little hesitation before throwing his supposed corpse out of the coach.
  - Practicing physician: Described as being young, he was on the coach and used his pocket-mirror to check Mr. Lackobreath for respiration, subsequently pronouncing him dead.
- Landlord of the tavern, the "Crow": The narrator deemed the landlord of the tavern a "hospitable man". This character claimed Mr. Lackobreath's luggage and sold his body to a surgeon.
- Surgeon: Despite believing that Mr. Lackobreath may be alive, he has no hesitation in removing the man's organs for later dissection or binding him in an attic.
- Apothecary: This character suspected that Mr. Lackobreath was dead, and performed electrical experiments on his body using a galvanic battery.
- Surgeon's Lady: She provided the surgeon with materials to bind Mr. Lackobreath.
- W--- [sic] (mail robber): A man sentenced to death for mail robbery, who resembles Mr. Lackobreath and is stated by the narrator to have "extreme infirmity and long-continued ill-health". When Mr. Lackobreath falls into the hangman's cart, the mail robber seizes the opportunity and escapes, leaving Mr. Lackobreath to take his place upon the gallows. He is later recaptured.
- Driver of hangman's cart: One of the few guards of the mail robber. The narrator noted that he was asleep.
- Two recruits of the sixth infantry: Also guarding the mail robber, they were drunk. Their attention was aroused by shifting in the cart and they confused Mr. Lackobreath for the mail robber, struck him with their muskets, and proceeded to lead him to the gallows.

== Plot summary ==
On the morning following their wedding, Mr. Lackobreath screams words of vilification at his wife. Mid-speech, Mr. Lackobreath realizes that he has literally lost his breath. Struggling to speak, he isolates himself in his private chamber to meditate upon the odd occurrence. After searching the room and failing to find his breath, Mr. Lackobreath decides to convince his wife that he must follow his dream for the stage, as a means of evading her and her inquiries.

Mr. Lackobreath decides to leave the country where he might conceal his condition in obscurity, but has some unfinished business in the city. He boards an overcrowded coach and during the journey, the press of colossal men displace his head and limbs. Motionless, Mr. Lackobreath is deemed dead, and pronounced so when a practicing physician detects no breath on his pocket mirror. Mr. Lackobreath's body is thrown from the coach, causing further injuries, and lands near the Crow tavern.

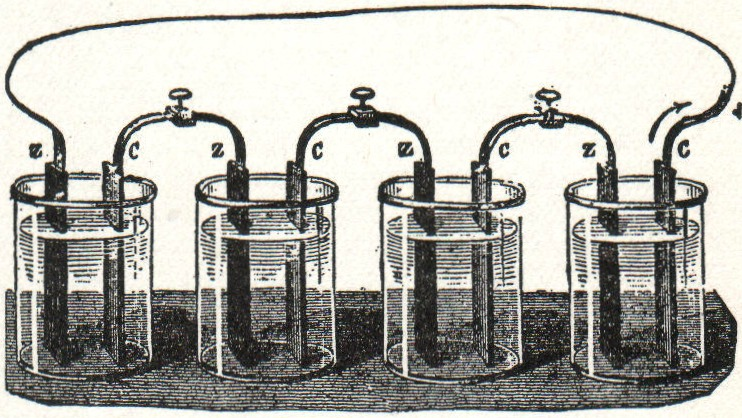
A simple galvanic battery, an electric battery oftentimes used as a medical device in the 19th century.

The landlord of the tavern lays claim to Mr. Lackobreath's luggage and sells his presumed corpse to a surgeon. The surgeon immediately begins dissecting Mr. Lackobreath during which he notices signs of movement. Believing Mr. Lackobreath may be alive, the surgeon calls for an apothecary and quickly removes several organs for later dissection. The apothecary believes Mr. Lackobreath to be dead and, electrocuting him with a battery in a series of curious experiments, Mr. Lackobreath's contortions are explained as a result of electrical discharge. Unable to arrive at a conclusion, the surgeon ties Mr. Lackobreath's body in his attic for later examination.

After two cats painfully bite his nose, Mr. Lackobreath regains control of himself and breaks free. He jumps out the window and into a hangman's cart. Mr. Lackobreath's resemblance to the cart's occupant is noted; the latter leaps out of the hangman's cart and disappears around the corner. The only men guarding the cart are a sleeping driver and two drunk infantry recruits, who assume Mr. Lackobreath to be the condemned and take him to the gallows where he is hanged. Having no breath to be restricted, however, he is unaffected and fakes convulsions and spasms for the amusement of the gathered crowd. Mr. Lackobreath's body is then interred at a receiving vault.

The narrator wonders if life remains in any of the coffins. He opens the lid of one and speculates on the life that the rotund man within may have led. When he criticizes another figure, who seems familiar, the man awakens and defends himself. Mr. Lackobreath finds that this man is his neighbor, Mr. Windenough, who recounts being struck with a sudden and second breath when he was passing by the home of the narrator. It caused an attack of epilepsy, which led to Mr. Windenough's premature interment. Concluding that this was the breath he was missing, Mr. Lackobreath demands its return, and Mr. Windenough apologetically accommodates through manner unexplained.

== Themes ==
=== Transcendentalism ===
Exploring the elevated spirituality of the human body, transcendentalism was one of the main discourses during Poe's time due to speculations of immortality and questions on the post-human subject as a result of progress in medicine. It is suggested that during Poe's time, experiments that investigated death and life's limit were popular. The philosophical ideas encompassed by transcendentalism are implied in "Loss of Breath" with the narrator's reflection that he was "alive with the qualifications of the dead – dead with the propensities of the living". Mr. Lackobreath is the embodiment of a physical impossibility: being alive without respiration. Such impossibilities intrigued many during the 19th century because new discoveries refuted prior beliefs that were thought to be true. The separation of the body and one's essence, or life, is suggested with the narrator's comment, "that die I did not. My body was, but I had no breath to be, suspended" [emphasis in original]. Yet another physical impossibility perceived and suggested in Poe's tale is resuscitation. There were points in the tale wherein Mr. Lackobreath was motionless, such as after the ride on the coach and after his body underwent surgical procedures and experimentation. Soon after, though, the character was aroused and brought back to life. Further exploring the limit of matter and transcendence of science, during his search for his breath early in the story, Mr. Lackobreath suggests that his breath, an indicator of the living, "might even have a tangible form".

Similarly, Poe explores "absurd metaphysicianism" with the mention of Schelling, a German philosopher. In the tale, the narrator notes, "In a very short time Schelling himself would have been satisfied with my entire loss of self-identity." Schelling investigated whether the idea of personal identity is lost at death and the singular entity of an individual beyond life and death. Mr. Lackobreath represents these concerns because he continues to identify as himself despite carrying characteristics of the dead, such as lacking respiration; however, by losing the ability to communicate effectively, he loses his identity. He ultimately cannot be defined as alive nor dead, yet everything he is continues to be beyond these limits.

=== Pseudoscience ===
In Poe's time, pseudoscience was used as a means to explain maladies and connect patients with medicine without the need for intervention from a physician. The common public was highly attracted to pseudoscience as a result of poor communication between physicians and patients. The knowledge that physicians had about medicine was also inconsistent, and this served as another factor that made pseudoscience appealing. This lack of reliability and resources led to many attempting to cure diseases or illnesses at home with common pseudoscience practices. There were no legitimate pain killers, so mesmerism and trance were practices used for anaesthetic purposes. Using accessible medical treatises, the public and writers were able to infer and attempt to diagnose.

Rapidly developing medical technology in the nineteenth century also required an explanation, and this is where mesmerism played a large role. Mesmerism is present in "Loss of Breath" with the reanimation of Mr. Lackobreath using electricity. Mesmerism is also consistently conveyed throughout the tale with the convergence of life and death, which is embodied by Mr. Lackobreath. Mr. Lackobreath's descriptions of symptoms indicative of dyspnea, as he self-diagnoses, is also a manner in which pseudoscience is present. For example, he notes his anxiety and "spasmodic action of the muscles of the throat". The mesmeric experiments gave way to sensationalism, which many critics accused Poe of using. Considered the "language of sensation", Poe used sensationalism via the mesmeric trance. Mr. Lackobreath represented an artificial death state that pushes the boundaries of human potential, and explored the sensations and awareness felt in the conscious transition from life to death.

== Historical context ==
=== Nineteenth-century medicine ===
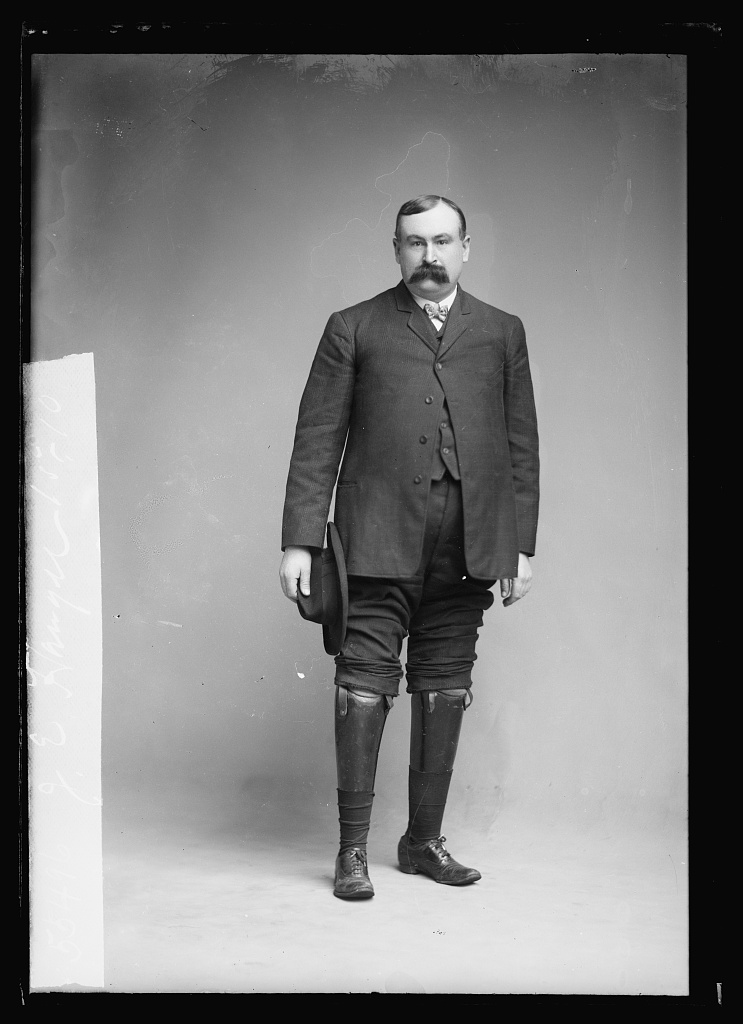
James Edward Hanger (1843–1919), an American Civil War veteran and prosthetist

During the nineteenth century, America was making great scientific advancements, and theories known today were being discovered. In this prewar period, physics especially was thriving with the discoveries of electrical resistance and conductance and electromagnetic induction, for example. Science was suggesting newfound human potential, and this stirred a growing fascination, interest, and even fear over new medical ideas, concepts, and practices. Many of these were expressed in writing and art. One of the fields that was advancing at the time was the prosthetic field. The prosthesis was being further explored and applied. The idea of artificial body parts is expressed in "Loss of Breath". When searching for his breath, the narrator mentions stumbling upon "a set of false teeth, two pair of hips, an eye". The repeated dismembering, separation, and unification of body parts in "Loss of Breath" can also be attributed to the emergence of prosthetics. For example, the narrator comments, "all my limbs were dislocated", "breaking of both my arms", and "cut off my ears"; however, these never proved crippling to the narrator.

Furthermore, this was a time that used surgical procedures and experiments for investigation; however, there was no absolute way to diagnose death or determine the exact moment of death. There were numerous cases of premature burials in the nineteenth century and this concerned many. Ultimately, some individuals felt the need to invent mechanisms within coffins which may alert those around it of life within it; these are oftentimes referred to as a safety coffin. As a result, Poe was not the only one preoccupied with premature interment. Although Poe explicitly expressed this concern in "The Premature Burial", he rather implicitly but, nonetheless, conveyed this in "Loss of Breath" with the premature burial of not only Mr. Lackobreath but also Mr. Windenough. Mr. Lackobreath is falsely declared or assumed dead in multiple instances: by the travellers on the coach, the practising physician, the surgeon, the apothecary, and the hangman. After suffering from an epileptic attack, Mr. Windenough is taken for dead. The narrator cares to note that he "busied [himself] in speculations about the mortality within", conveying the doubts of the time.

== Criticism of medical practitioners ==
A popular sentiment during the nineteenth century was a lack of trust in physicians. Poe oftentimes expressed this in his writing, with "Loss of Breath" being among his sharpest satires of the profession. The extent of intrusion and invasion of one's body by an anatomist was emphasized and caused fear. There was a concern with how the cadaver would be "raped" with surgical instruments, and a fear of the unknown and giving one's body freely and willingly to practitioners that may not know what they are doing. Sometimes, a mere coma or temporary suspended animation was the cause of premature autopsy or burial. This criticism is conveyed in "Loss of Breath" when the surgeon does not hesitate to cut into Mr. Lackobreath's body immediately, failing to notice that he was actually alive prior to doing so. For example, "Having cut off my ears, however, he discovered signs of animation." Despite recognizing signs of life, the surgeon proceeded to remove organs for dissection. The apothecary is also deemed ignorant as he curiously experiments with Mr. Lackobreath's body and fails to observe the signs of life as the narrator struggled to depict such. Poe characterized the limited knowledge among physicians with the practising physician, the surgeon, and the apothecary. On the other hand, in the public vault, Mr. Lackobreath found that Mr. Windenough was actually alive, while he was considered dead after suffering from an epileptic seizure. Poe suggests that common folk in the public vault can determine the state of death or life of another better than working practitioners and physicians. Another criticism of the medical practices was the lack of accurate instruments and technology. For example, the practising physician in the coach had nothing but a pocket-mirror to determine whether Mr. Lackobreath was alive, which led to an inaccurate conclusion.

Poe also expands on the faulty speech and diagnoses of practitioners. Many considered physicians to provide patients with incomplete or inconsistent information during Poe's time. Doctors were criticized for avoiding a clear naming of the disease. The narrator in "Loss of Breath" mocks this because he diagnoses himself as having dyspnea by noting several common symptoms of it, but never explicitly stating so. He details his symptoms to prove his knowledge; for example, shortness of breath is one of the symptoms, which is emphasized with the character's complete lack of breath. Furthermore, dyspnea is associated with spasms in the throat, which the narrator notes, "I find, not upon the current of the breath, but upon a certain spasmodic action of the muscles of the throat."

== Publication history ==
The short story was initially published on 10 November 1832 as "A Decided Loss" in the Saturday Courier, Vol. II, No. 35. In this first version, the characters are not given any name and the narrator is deceased while being experimented upon by the apothecary. It was revised and printed with the new name, "Loss of Breath", in 1835, in the Southern Literary Messenger. It was revised again and printed in The Broadway Journal in 1846.
