= Landor's Cottage =

- Short story by Edgar Allan Poe

Text available at Wikisource
- Original title: Landor's Cottage: A Pendant to 'The Domain of Arnheim'
- Country: United States
- Language: English

Publication
- Published in: The Flag of Our Union
- Publication type: Periodical
- Publisher: Frederick Gleason
- Publication date: June 9, 1849

"Landor's Cottage" is a short story by American writer Edgar Allan Poe. Published in the June 9, 1849 edition of The Flag of Our Union, the story follows an unnamed narrator as they travel through valleys, searching for the village of B—— before nightfall.

== Plot ==
The story is a first-person narrative in which the narrator seeks to find a village before night. They walk with their dog, Ponto, and enjoy the scenery and the road as they follow overgrown carriage tracks through a field. The sound of water leads them to a building hidden in the mist of a waterfall. The narrator admires a beautiful cottage, then travels into a valley to a village. There, they are greeted by a mastiff, and knock on the door of a house. A young woman, Annie, invites them inside, where they meet Mr. Landor in the parlor. After describing his residence, the story concludes by saying the story was written simply to paint a picture, "as I found it", of Mr. Landor's valley home, with the "particulars of Mr. Landor himself" possibly forming the subject for their next article.

== Publication history ==
Poe wrote the story in late 1848 or early 1849. In a letter dated January 21, 1849, he wrote to Annie L. Richmond, saying "[n]ot long ago", he sent the story to Metropolitan for review. But after the magazine cancelled, with only two released issues, the story was returned to Poe and he later sent it to The Flag of Our Union in April or May 1849.

Originally, the tale was subtitled, "A Pendant to the 'Domain of Arnheim'", "The Domain of Arnheim" being a short story by Poe published in March 1847 in John Inman's Columbian Magazine.

In 1865, French poet, Charles Baudelaire translated and published "Landor's Cottage" in Grotesque and Serious Stories through Michel Lévy Frères.

== Analysis ==
In Joan Dayan's essay, The Road to Landor's Cottage: Poe's Landscape of Effect, she argues that Poe was not merely painting a picturesque scene, as the narrator states by the tale's conclusion, "[i]t is not the purpose of this work to do more than give, in detail, a picture of Mr. Landor's residence—as I found it", but instead, to subvert expectations through language. In her own words, "[a]n abrupt termination to what seemed to be an endless series of measures, colors and forms joining to construct a picture or decompose a vision...the last sentence sounds a false note."

Dayan finds Poe to be a "destroyer of meaning." Using "figures that obscure straightforward exposition", he constructs his language in such a way that, through the context of a typical Poe horror tale, the reader is always anticipating a shocking reveal. When the narrator describes a crowded pond full of fish, Dayan sees "those countless tulips amassed within the thick-scented valley" described earlier. She is reminded of "Ligeia's abundant hair or the excessively white and numerous teeth of Berenice for these initially common landscape elements". She uses the narrator following a road as an example: It would "signal an approach toward something sinister or at least unknowable."

As for obscuring straightforward language, Dayan claims in "[n]ot knowing how a slope could be called a hill only at its northern face, why a hill has been distinguished from a slope, a slope from an eminence," and that "these series of appellations amount to no more than successive approximations that defy definition." However, Benjamin Franklin Fisher IV in his A Gathering of Poe Essays concludes that Dayan may be misinterpreting the story because 'eminences' and 'slopes' are only synonyms for each other and the 'hills' are merely "higher slopes".
