= The Spectacles (short story) =

- Short story by Edgar Allan Poe
- Country: United States
- Language: English
- Genres: Comedy; Short story

Publication
- Published in: Philadelphia Dollar Newspaper
- Media type: Print (Periodical)
- Publication date: March 1844

"The Spectacles" is a short story by Edgar Allan Poe, first published in March 1844 in the Philadelphia Dollar Newspaper. It is one of Poe's comedy tales.

== Plot summary ==
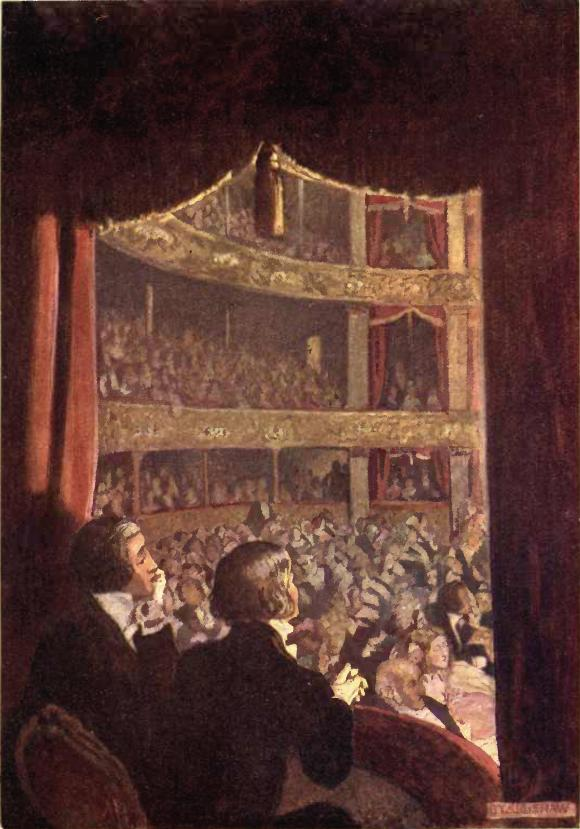
Illustration by Byam Shaw for a London edition dated 1909

The narrator, 22-year-old Napoleon Buonaparte Froissart, changes his last name to "Simpson" as a requirement to inherit a large sum from a distant cousin, Adolphus Simpson. At the opera he sees a beautiful woman in the audience and falls in love instantly. He describes her beauty at length, despite not being able to see her well; he requires spectacles but, in his vanity, "resolutely refused to employ them". His companion Talbot identifies the woman as Madame Eugenie Lalande, a wealthy widow, and promises to introduce the two. He courts her and proposes marriage; she makes him promise that, on their wedding night, he will wear his spectacles.

When he puts on the spectacles, he sees that she is a toothless old woman. He expresses horror at her appearance, and even more so when he learns she is 82 years old. She begins a rant about a very foolish descendant of hers, one Napoleon Buonaparte Froissart. He realizes that she is his great-great-grandmother. Madame Lalande, who is also Mrs. Simpson, had come to America to meet her husband's heir. She was accompanied by a much younger relative, Madame Stephanie Lalande. Whenever the narrator spoke of "Madame Lalande", everyone assumed he meant the younger woman. When the elder Madame Lalande discovered that he had mistaken her for a young woman because of his eyesight, and that he had been openly courting her instead of being civil to a relative, she decided to play a trick on him with the help of Talbot and another confederate. Their wedding was a fake. He ends by marrying Madame Stephanie and vows to "never be met without SPECTACLES" — having acquired a pair of his own at last.

== Publication history and response ==
"The Spectacles" was first published in the Philadelphia Dollar Newspaper in the March 27, 1844 issue. Contemporary critics suggested that the piece was paid by the word, hence its relatively high length, especially for a work of humor. Upon its reprinting in the Broadway Journal in March 1845, Poe himself acknowledged he was "not aware of the great length of 'The Spectacles' until too late to remedy the evil".

The editor of the Philadelphia Dollar Newspaper printed "The Spectacles" with the comment that "it is one of the best from [Poe's] chaste and able pen and second only to the popular prize production, 'The Gold-Bug.'" Editor John Stephenson Du Solle reprinted the story in his daily newspaper Spirit of the Times in Philadelphia, saying, "Poe's Story of 'The Spectacles' is alone worth double the price of the paper." It was first published overseas in the May 3, 1845, issue of London-based Lloyd's Entertaining Journal.

== Major themes ==
Besides warning readers to obey their eye doctors, Poe seems to be addressing the concept of "love at first sight" – in fact, the first line of the story points out that "it was the fashion to ridicule the idea". Yet, the story is presented to "add another to the already almost innumerable instances of the truth of the position" that love at first sight does exist. The irony is that the narrator does not have a "first sight" of the woman he falls in love with, due to his lack of spectacles.

Additionally, the story is based around vanity. The narrator changes his name, with "much repugnance", from Froissart to Simpson, "a rather usual and plebeian" name, in order to receive an inheritance. His original patronym, he says, elicited in him "a very pardonable pride". This same pride kept him from wearing spectacles. Madame Lalande admits that she was teaching him a lesson.

The name of "Napoleon Buonaparte" makes obvious reference to the Corsican general Napoleon. The story also has very strong Oedipal tones.

Scholar Carmen Trammell Skaggs noted that the story, though intended to be humorous, nevertheless showed Poe's awareness of the opera. He references the soprano singer Maria Malibran and the San Carlo, and he also describes vocal technique in a way that implies a close knowledge of the subject. Skaggs also emphasizes Poe's role as a music critic for the New York Evening Mirror and, later, the Broadway Journal.
