= Godey's Lady's Book =

Women's magazine published in the US

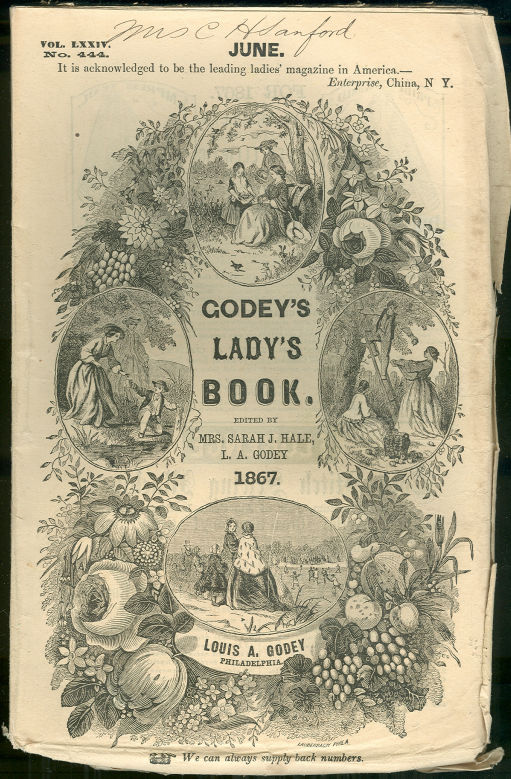
Cover from June 1867 issue

Godey's Lady's Book, alternatively known as Godey's Magazine and Lady's Book, was a women's magazine that was published in Philadelphia from 1830 to 1896. It was the most widely circulated magazine in the period before the American Civil War. Its circulation rose from 70,000 in the 1840s to 150,000 in 1860. In the 1860s Godey's considered itself the "queen of monthlies". After several changes, it ceased publication in 1896.

== Overview ==
The magazine was published by Louis A. Godey of Philadelphia for 48 years (1830–1878). Godey intended to take advantage of the popularity of gift books, many of which were marketed specifically to women. Each issue contained poetry, articles, and engravings created by prominent writers and other artists of the time. Sarah Josepha Hale (author of "Mary Had a Little Lamb") was its editor from 1837 until 1877 and only published original, American manuscripts. Although the magazine was read and contained work by both men and women, Hale published three special issues that only included work done by women.

When Hale started at Godey's, the magazine had a circulation of ten thousand subscribers. Two years later, it jumped to 40,000 and by 1860 had 150,000 subscribers.

In 1845, Louis Godey began copyrighting each issue of the magazine to prevent other magazine and newspaper editors from infringing their texts. This move, a first in the United States, was criticized by editors at the Baltimore Saturday Visiter. They called it a "narrowly selfish course" and stated that Godey would "rue it bitterly".

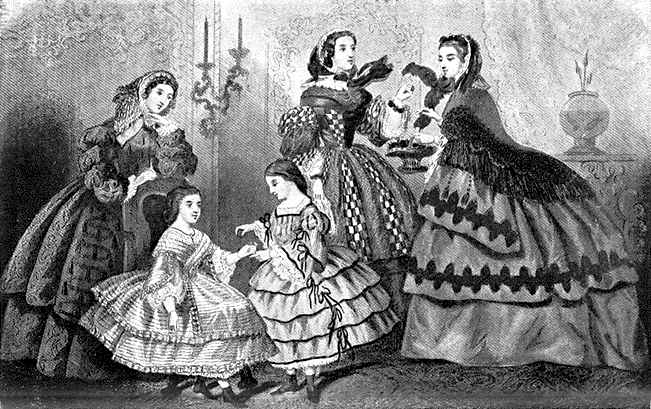
An 1859 fashion plate from Godey's Lady's Book showing crinoline fashions

The magazine was expensive for the time; subscribers paid $3 per year (for comparison, The Saturday Evening Post was only $2 per year). Even so, it was the most popular journal in its day. Under Hale's editorship, the list of subscribers to Godey's reached 150,000. Hale took advantage of her role and became influential as an arbiter of American taste. She used some of her influence to further several causes for women. For example, she created a regular section with the heading "Employment for Women" beginning in 1852 to discuss women in the workforce.

In general, Godey disliked discussing political issues or controversial topics in his magazine. In the 1850s, he dismissed Sara Jane Lippincott ("Grace Greenwood") as assistant editor for denouncing slavery in the National Era. Lippincott publicly denounced Godey in response and Godey later recanted. Nevertheless, he forbade his journal from taking a position during the American Civil War. In fact, during the war, the magazine made no acknowledgment of it whatsoever, and readers looked elsewhere for war-related information. In the process, Godey's lost about one-third of its subscribers.

Godey sold the magazine in 1877 to John Hill Seyes Haulenbeek before his death in 1878. After further changes of ownership, and a name change to "Godey's Magazine" to reflect a broader content, it ceased publication in 1896.

== Contents ==
The magazine is best known for the hand-tinted fashion plate that appeared at the start of each issue, which provide a record of the progression of women's dress. Publisher Louis Godey boasted that in 1859 it cost $105,200 to produce the Lady's Book, with the coloring of the fashion-plates costing $8,000. Beginning in 1853, almost every issue also included an illustration and pattern with measurements for a garment to be sewn at home. A sheet of music for piano provided the latest waltz, polka or galop.

Fashion plates found in Godey's, accompanied by descriptions of the garment and for what it was to be used, caused everyday feminine activities to be depicted in a consumer light. For example, Godey's fashion plates present walking, riding, and even domestic cooking as a chance to participate in fashion and consumer culture (i.e. a woman's walking suit). “[Godey's] promoted a new clothing calendar, one not divided by seasons or unique events like weddings, but that elevated and transformed quotidian occasions like walking and taking tea into significant opportunities for self-fashioning and performance.”

Edgar Allan Poe had one of his earliest short stories "The Visionary" (later renamed "The Assignation") printed in Godey's in 1834. He also published several other works in the magazine: "A Tale of the Ragged Mountains" (April 1844), "The Oblong Box" (September 1844), "Thou Art the Man" (November 1844), and "The Cask of Amontillado" (1846). Other contributors included Nathaniel Hawthorne, Oliver Wendell Holmes, Washington Irving, James Kirke Paulding, William Gilmore Simms, Nathaniel Parker Willis, and Frances Hodgson Burnett.

== Influence ==
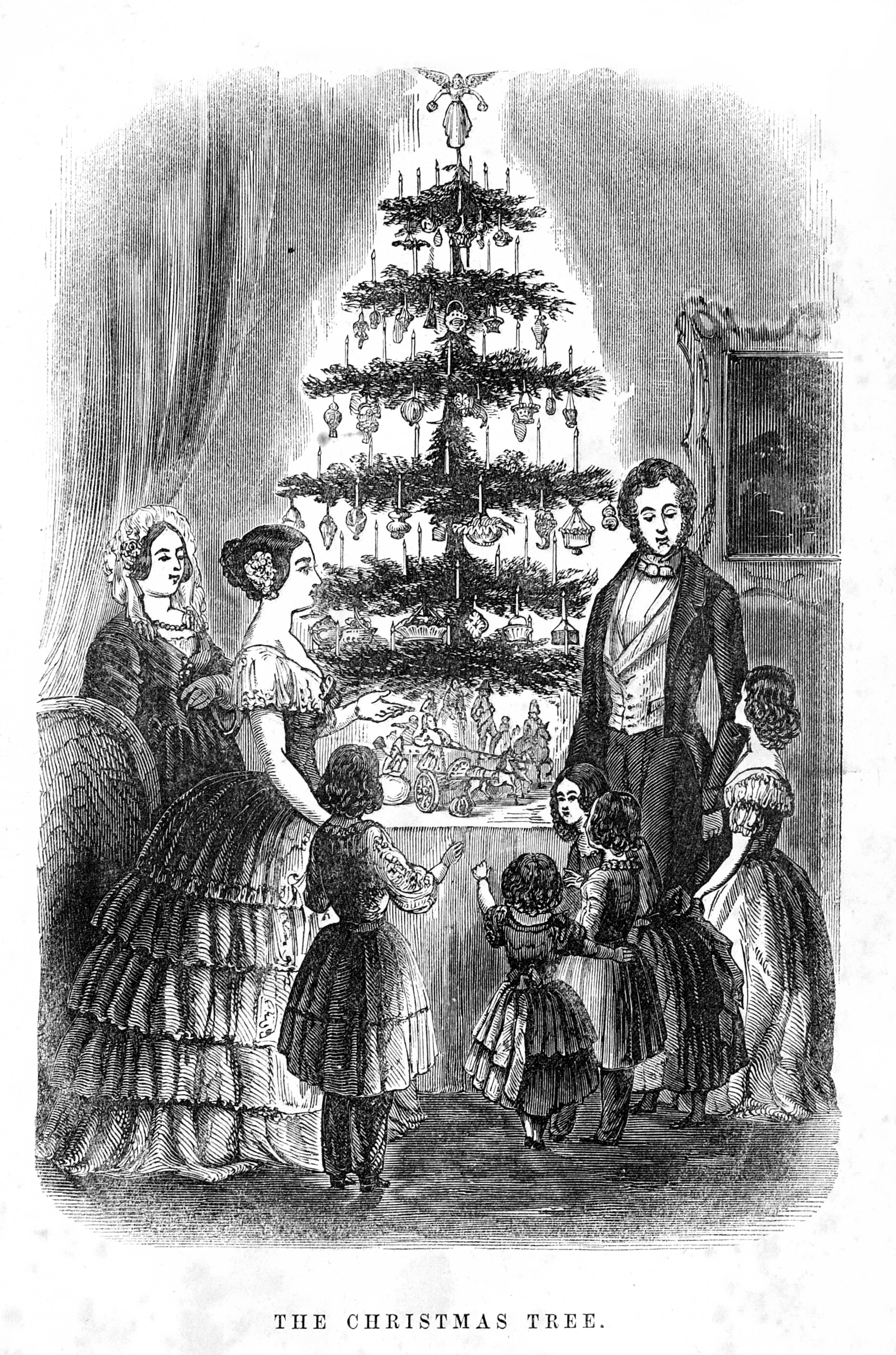
Queen Victoria style of Christmas tree 1848, a picture adapted for Godey's Lady's Book, December 1850

Magazine editor Sarah Hale used her role to influence various causes. She used the magazine, for example, to advocate the education of women. Some of her articles focused on writing techniques and offered reading lists similar to those offered to college students. She wrote about schools that accepted women as students and praised Vassar College, which opened in 1865, and personally assisted in funding it. She believed that women's education should be similar to that of men and advocated that more professions be open to women, including medicine.

Hale also used her editorial space and influence to advocate for the establishment of a national Thanksgiving holiday. Hale presented a series of appealing articles in her magazine featuring descriptions of food and recipes now considered 'typical' of Thanksgiving, such as roasted turkeys, savory stuffing, and pumpkin pies. In 1858 Hale petitioned the President of the United States, James Buchanan, to declare Thanksgiving a national holiday.

She held up Queen Victoria as a role model of feminity, morality and intellect, and Godey's hired Lydia Sigourney to report on the royal activities in London. The tradition of a white wedding is commonly credited to Queen Victoria's choice to wear a white wedding dress at her wedding to Prince Albert in 1840. With American women following styles or dress set by the young Queen, less than a decade after her wedding Godey’s incorrectly claimed that a white wedding gown had been a long-standing tradition representing female virginity, writing: “Custom has decided, from the earliest ages, that white is the most fitting hue, whatever may be the material. It is an emblem of the purity and innocence of girlhood, and the unsullied heart she now yields to the chosen one.” However, custom previous to Victoria's wedding ceremony had been to wear colorful gowns.

A woodcut of the British Royal family with their tree at Windsor Castle was copied in Godey's at Christmas 1850. The engraving was based on an earlier image of Queen Victoria and her decorated Christmas tree previously published in The Illustrated London News in December 1848. The Godey's version removed Victoria's tiara and Prince Albert's mustache altering their faces to remake the engraving into an American scene. It was the first widely circulated picture of a decorated evergreen Christmas tree in America, and art historian Karal Ann Marling called it "the first influential American Christmas tree". Folk-culture historian Alfred Shoemaker summed up that "in all of America there was no more important medium in spreading the Christmas tree in the decade 1850–60 than Godey's Lady's Book". The image was reprinted in 1860 and, by the 1870s, erecting a Christmas tree had become common in the United States home.

== See also ==
- Arthur's Magazine, later merged into Godey's Lady's Book
- Arthur's Lady's Home Magazine, a similar publication
- List of women's magazines
