= The Conchologist's First Book =

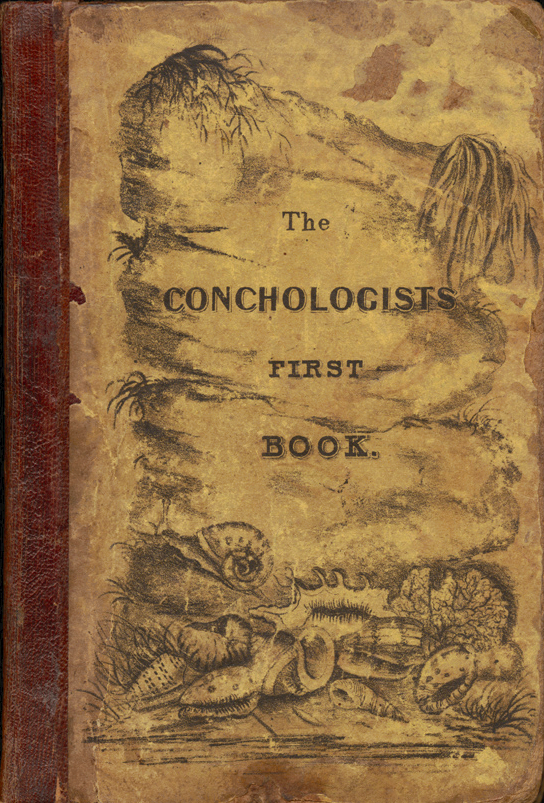
- Cover for the first edition
- Author: Edgar Allan Poe
- Language: English
- Genre: Scientific textbook
- Publisher: Haswell, Barrington, and Haswell
- Publication date: 1839
- Publication place: United States
- Media type: Print

The Conchologist's First Book (sometimes subtitled with Or, A System of Testaceous Malacology) is an illustrated textbook on conchology issued in 1839, 1840, and 1845. The book was originally printed under Edgar Allan Poe's name. The text was based on Manual of Conchology by Thomas Wyatt, an English author and lecturer.

== Preparation of the text and publication ==
Wyatt's original book, Manual of Conchology, had been published by Harper & Brothers. Wyatt's book contained multiple illustrations of shells and carried the cover price of $8, a price too high for both beginners and advanced students of conchology. Wyatt intended a cheaper, concise edition to be used in schools with a price of $1.50, but Harper's did not want to produce a second edition that would compete with sales of the first. Poe was an experienced editor at the time, but was still facing financial difficulties. Wyatt had said, "Poe needed money very sorely at the time," and so Poe allowed the use of his name to popularize the book. The Philadelphia-based publishing firm Haswell, Barrington, and Haswell paid Poe $50 for the right to use his name on the title page. However, Poe's contribution was not just his name. In addition to writing the preface and introduction, Poe made some significant changes to Wyatt's original text. Poe translated the French text by Georges Cuvier into English, worked on the accounts of the animals, constructed a new classification scheme, and organized the book. Poe also drew on his acquaintance and association with Dr. Edmund Ravenel, an "eminent conchologist", who had resided on Sullivan's Island during Poe's army service.

== Reception ==
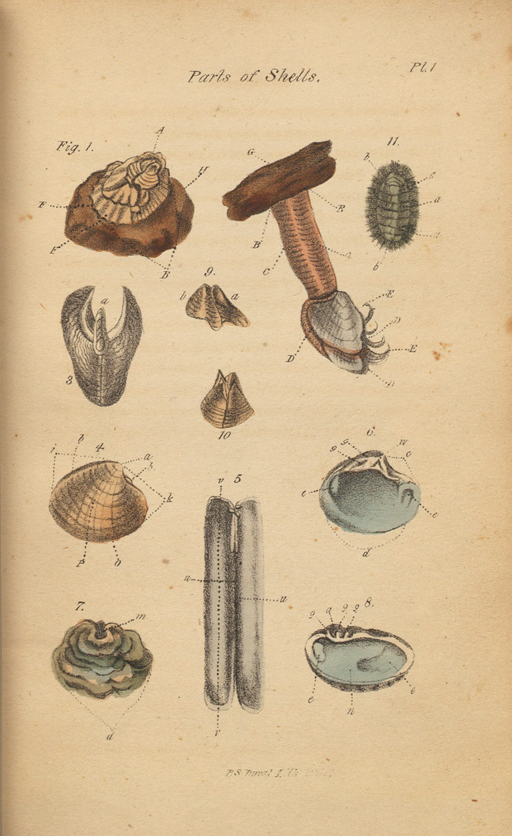
The second edition of the book included colored illustrations

The new edition sold out within two months and was used in schools as had been hoped, though Poe received no royalties for its sales. It was the only volume by Poe to go into a second edition in the United States during his lifetime. The edition was the cause of several accusations of plagiarism against Poe. In 1844, Poe tried to publish more of his work with Harper's (which had also printed his novel The Narrative of Arthur Gordon Pym of Nantucket) but was informed by a friend, "They have complaints against you... grounded on certain movements of yours."

Poe denied the charges and wrote that he would sue over the allegation: "This charge is infamous, and I shall prosecute for it, as soon as I settle my accounts with the 'Mirror.'" As he explained the book:

I wrote it in conjunction with Professor Thomas Wyatt, and Professor McMultrie... my name being put to the work, as best known and most likely to aid its circulation. I wrote the Preface and Introduction, and translated from Cuvier, the accounts of the animals, etc. All School-books are necessarily made in a similar way.

A second edition appeared in 1840 with Poe's name on the title page, but the 1845 edition appeared without it.

Wyatt's book, in turn, had taken much material from The Conchologist's Textbook by the British naturalist Thomas Brown without attribution. Brown's book had been published in Glasgow, Scotland in 1837. Brown had based his text on the previous work of Jean-Baptiste Lamarck and Carl Linnaeus, noting on the title page that his book was "embracing the arrangements of Jean-Baptiste Lamarck and Linnaeus". Poe had penciled in as the last sentence to the preface of his personal copy of the first edition an acknowledgment to Brown: "Also to Mr. T. Brown upon whose excelent [sic] book he has very largely drawn". However, this acknowledgement was not incorporated into the second edition.

== Significance ==
The American paleontologist Stephen Jay Gould wrote that Poe made significant contributions to the text by his editing and, more importantly, by translating Cuvier's passages into English. John H. Lienhard contends that in simplifying a rather esoteric subject, Poe made significant contributions in popularizing science in the United States.
