= The Journal of Julius Rodman =

Unfinished novel by Edgar Allan Poe

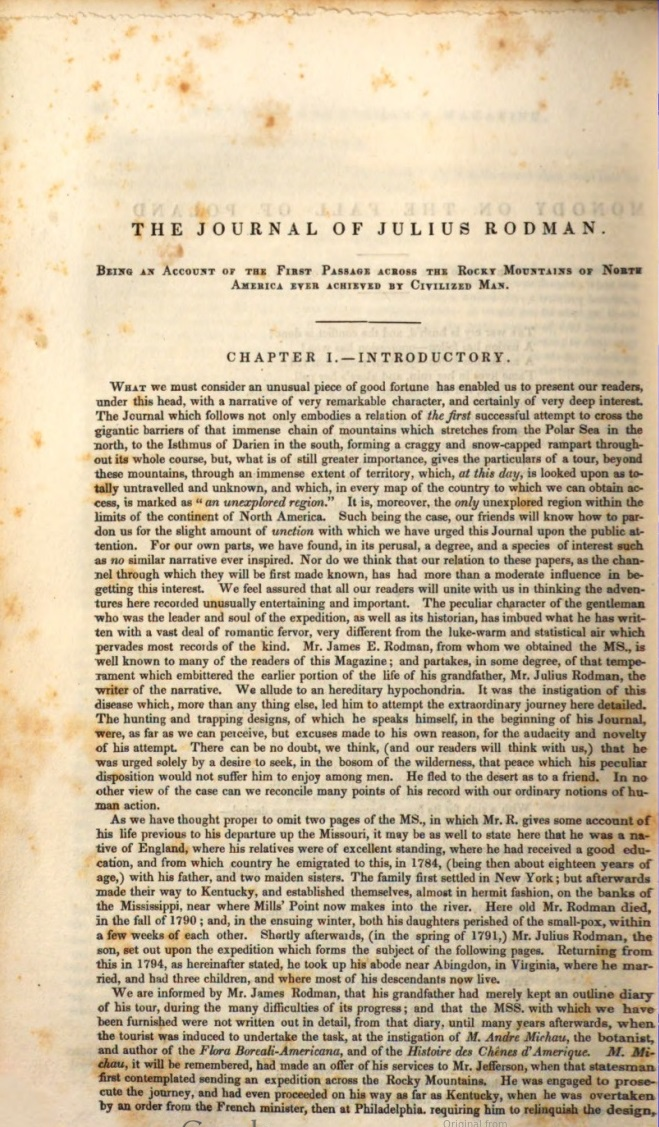
- Author: Edgar Allan Poe
- Original title: The Journal of Julius Rodman, Being an Account of the First Passage across the Rocky Mountains of North America Ever Achieved by Civilized Man
- Language: English
- Series: First of six installments or chapters
- Genre: Adventure novel
- Publisher: Burton's Gentleman's Magazine (serial)
- Publication date: January 1840
- Publication place: United States
- Media type: Print (Periodical)

The Journal of Julius Rodman, Being an Account of the First Passage across the Rocky Mountains of North America Ever Achieved by Civilized Man is an unfinished serial novel by American author Edgar Allan Poe published in 1840.

== Plot ==
The Journal of Julius Rodman is a fictionalized account of the first expedition across the Western Wilderness, crossing the Rocky Mountains. The journal chronicled a 1792 expedition led by Julius Rodman up the Missouri River to the Northwest. This 1792 expedition would have made Rodman the first European to cross the Rocky Mountains. The detailed journal chronicles events of the most surprising nature, and recounts "the unparalleled vicissitudes and adventures experienced by a handful of men in a country which, until then, had never been explored by 'civilised man'."

Julius Rodman was an English emigrant who first settled in New York, then moved to Kentucky and Mississippi. His expedition which departed from Mills' Point up the Missouri River with several companions was described in a diary. The manuscript of the diary was submitted by his heir, James E. Rodman.

Rodman is accompanied on his expedition by Pierre Junôt; Alexander Wormley; Toby; Andrew Thornton; and the five Greely brothers, John, Robert, Meredith, Frank, and Poindexter. The party is described as "mere travellers for pleasure", abandoning commercial or pecuniary motives. They traveled by canoe and by a thirty foot long keelboat which was bulletproof. The travelers described the White Cliffs of the Missouri: "The face of these remarkable cliffs, as might be supposed, is chequered with a variety of lines formed by the trickling of the rains upon the soft material, so that a fertile fancy might easily imagine them to be gigantic monuments reared by human art, and carved over with hieroglyphical devices." In the final chapter, a ferocious attack by two grizzly bears on the expedition party is described: "We had scarcely time to say a word to each other before two enormous brown bears (the first we had yet encountered during the voyage) came rushing at us open-mouthed from a clump of rose-bushes." Their fierceness was detailed: "These animals are much dreaded by the Indians, and with reason, for they are indeed formidable creatures, possessing prodigious strength, with untamable ferocity, and the most wonderful tenacity of life." A member of the party, Greely, is attacked and mauled by one of the bears. Rodman and another member, the Prophet, assist him. They shoot the bear but cannot stop the attack. Subsequently, Rodman and the Prophet are attacked. Cornered on the cliff, they are saved from death by Greely, who shoots the bear at point-blank range: "Our deliverer, who had fought many a bear in his life-time, had put his pistol deliberately to the eye of the monster, and the contents had entered his brain."

== Publication history ==
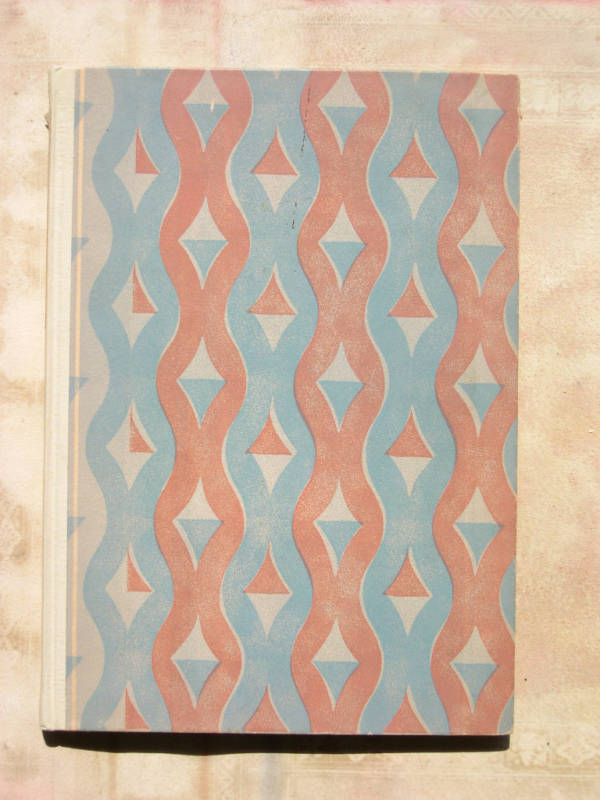
1947 cover of reprint by The Colt Press with colored wood engravings by Mallette Dean

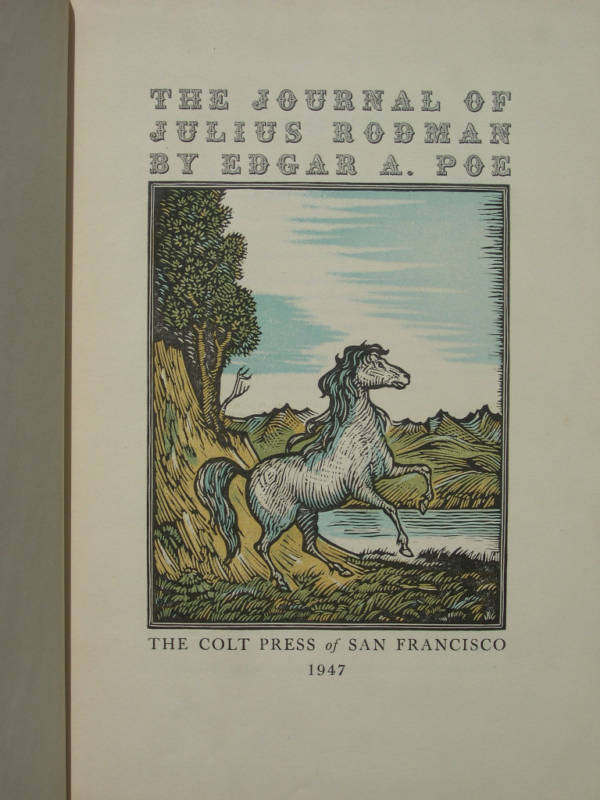
1947 reprint title page by The Colt Press, San Francisco

Six installments of the novel were published in Burton's Gentleman's Magazine's January through June issues in 1840. At the time, Poe was a contributing editor of the journal. He was fired from the job in June 1840 by William Burton and refused to continue the novel.

The work was reprinted in 1947 by The Colt Press in San Francisco as a hardcover book with wood engravings by Mallette Dean and with an introduction by Jane Bissell Grabhorn. In 2008, Pushkin Press republished the novel in a new illustrated edition with an afterword by Michael David. In 2009, Chris Aruffo made an audio recording of the novel as part of a series.

== Reception ==
In 1840, members of the United States Senate believed the story to be a true account. Robert Greenhow (1800–1854), a native of Richmond, Virginia, whose family may have known Poe, wrote a paragraph about the work in U.S. Senate Document of the 26th Congress, 1st Session, Volume IV (1839–40), pages 140-141, entitled "Memoir, Historical and Political, on the Northwest Coast of North America, and the Adjacent Territories; Illustrated by a Map and a Geographical View of Those Countries". The document stated, "It is proper to notice here an account of an expedition across the American continent, made between 1791 and 1794, by a party of citizens of the United States, under the direction of Julius Rodman, whose journal has been recently discovered in Virginia, and is now in course of publication in a periodical magazine at Philadelphia." Greenhow admitted that the full expedition had not yet been completely reported.

This unintended "hoax" on the U.S. Senate suggests Poe's ability to add credibility to his fiction. In 1844, Greenhow's "Memoir" was expanded and reprinted in book form as The History of Oregon and California and Other Territories on the North-West Coast of North America. In its second edition, references to Julius Rodman were removed, implying Greenhow learned of his error.
