= Broadway Journal =

American newspaper

The Broadway Journal, January 4, 1845, Vol. 1, No. 1.

The Broadway Journal was a short-lived New York City-based newspaper founded by Charles Frederick Briggs and John Bisco in 1844 and was published from January 1845 to January 1846. In its first year, the publication was bought by Edgar Allan Poe, becoming the only periodical he ever owned, though it failed after only a few months under his leadership.

== History ==
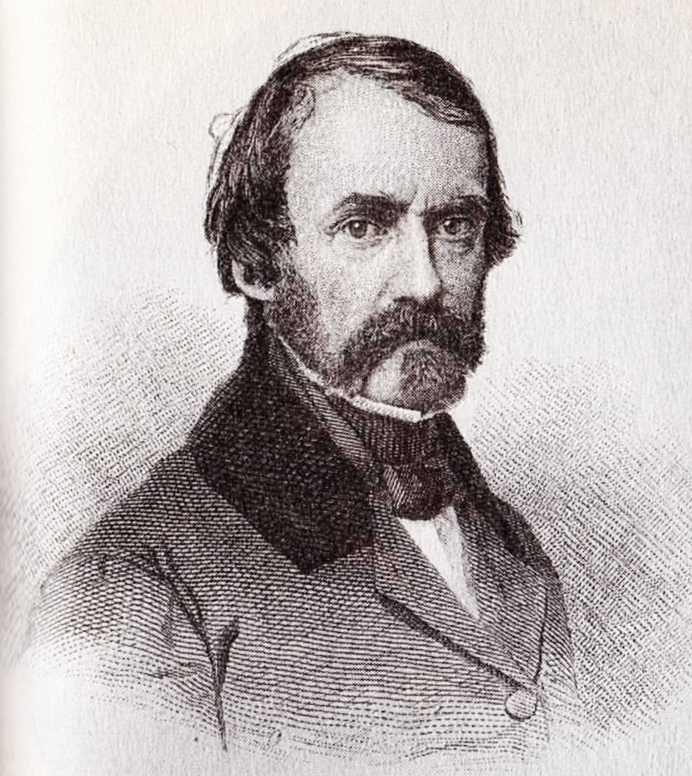
Charles Frederick Briggs, one of the two founders of the Broadway Journal

Briggs, previously known as a satire novelist under the pseudonym "Harry Franco", wrote a letter to James Russell Lowell on December 7, 1844, announcing his intentions to start a journal. "The name will be, for the sake of individuality and a-part-from-other-peopleness, the Broadway Journal, or Review, or Chronicle, or Broadway Something". Upon its founding as the Broadway Journal, Briggs handled the editorial duties and solicited for contributors while his business partner John Bisco handled the publishing and financial concerns.

On February 21, 1845, Edgar Allan Poe signed a year-long contract to become an editor of the publication. He also agreed to write at least one page worth of original material per week. He received one-third of the profits as well. Soon, however, Poe's caustic reputation as a critic began to bother Briggs and he intended to get rid of both Poe and Bisco. He was, however, unsuccessful in finding new financial backers when Bisco raised his price. Poe, for a time, considered selling his own portion of the journal to Evert Augustus Duyckinck or Cornelius Mathews. Briggs tried to buy out Bisco, who asked for more money than Briggs was willing to pay. By June, however, Briggs resigned due to financial difficulties and, in October, Bisco sold his part of the newspaper to Poe for $50 (Poe paid with a note endorsed by Horace Greeley). Poe, then, had full editorial control and ownership of the Broadway Journal.

Poe published new versions of many of his works, including "The Masque of the Red Death," "The Oval Portrait," and others. He also continued his role as a literary critic, including accusations of plagiarism against Henry Wadsworth Longfellow. He also used the Broadway Journal for a very public flirtation with Frances Sargent Osgood and to raise money for his never-realized dream of a new magazine to be named The Penn.

Poe was unable to keep the publication financially successful, though he had hoped to turn it around. A loan of $50 from Rufus Wilmot Griswold in October 1845 helped sustain it for a short time. In a November 15, 1845, letter to friend and poet Thomas Holley Chivers he vowed, "I will make a fortune of it yet." Even so, the publication officially ended with a final issue dated January 3, 1846, which included the valedictory:

Unsuspected engagements demanding my whole attention, and the objects being unfulfilled so far as regards myself personally, for which the Broadway Journal was established, I now, as its editor, bid farewell - as cordially to foes as to friends. -Edgar A. Poe

After taking over full control of the Journal, Poe had asked for the support of friends. Referring to this after its closure, Cornelia Wells Walter of the Boston Evening Transcript wrote a poem:

To trust in friends is but so so
Especially when cash is low;
The Broadway Journal's proved "no go" —
Friends would not pay the pen of POE.

== Content ==
The Broadway Journal attempted to be a more serious intellectual journal compared to others at the time. Because of this, it had a smaller audience and was less financially successful. It emphasized literary reviews but also featured criticism of Art, theater, and music as well as poetry and articles on politics.

== See also ==
Other American journals that Edgar Allan Poe was involved with include:

- American Review: A Whig Journal
- Burton's Gentleman's Magazine
- Godey's Lady's Book
- Graham's Magazine
- Southern Literary Messenger
- The Stylus
