= Baltimore Saturday Visiter =

Logo of Baltimore Saturday Visiter in October 1833

The Baltimore Saturday Visiter was a weekly periodical in Baltimore, Maryland, in 1832. It published some of the early works of Baltimore writer Edgar Allan Poe.

== History ==
Baltimore Saturday Visiter was founded in 1832 by Charles Cloud and Lambert Wilmer, a friend of Edgar Allan Poe. The periodical was initially popular. It later became abolitionist, and in 1847 was absorbed by The National Era, an abolitionist publication in Washington D.C.

Poe submitted to the Visiter six tales as entries to a contest sponsored by the publication. The newspaper promised a $50 prize for the best tale and a $25 prize for the best poem submitted by October 1, 1833. In response, about 100 entries were received, but the judges chose Poe's "MS. Found in a Bottle" for its originality. In addition to the $50 prize, the story was published in the October 19 issue of the Visiter. The contest, however, had some controversy. The winner of the poetry portion of the contest, "Henry Wilton," was revealed to actually be John Hewitt, the editor of the Visiter. Poe claimed Hewitt had won by "underhanded means."

== Notes ==
- ^1 Alternately named the Saturday Morning Visiter (1832–33), Baltimore Saturday Visiter (1833–34), Baltimore Visiter (1834–40), Saturday Morning Visiter (1840–41), and Saturday Morning Visitor (1841–47).
