= Tales of Mystery & Imagination =

Edgar Allan Poe anthology

Tales of Mystery & Imagination (often rendered as Tales of Mystery and Imagination) is a popular title for posthumous compilations of writings by American author, essayist and poet Edgar Allan Poe and was the first complete collection of his works specifically restricting itself to his suspenseful and related tales.

== Background ==
In 1839, during Poe's lifetime, a collection of his tales was published, but it did not include some selections which were written later, including "The Murders in the Rue Morgue" and "A Descent into the Maelström". The first posthumous collection of Poe's works was compiled in 1850 and included a memoir from Rufus Wilmot Griswold, but this did not confine itself to his tales of suspense and related tales. Several collections of Poe's prose and poetry followed. The precursor to Tales of Mystery and Imagination was a collection of Poe's works entitled Tales of Mystery, Imagination and Humor. The title "Tales of Mystery and Imagination" was first used by "The World's Classics", London, and printed by Grant Richard, 48 Leicester Sq. in 1902. The title of this collection was then adopted by Padraic Colum in 1908 in view of the growing reputation of Poe's taste for suspense, especially in the context of what his French critic M. Brunetiere called events "on the margin" of life. The original collection, in keeping with its title, deliberately excluded Poe's poems, comedies and essays. In his introduction to the 1908 edition Colum cites a reason for his adoption of this selection: his opinion that "tales" as opposed to "short stories" were so short that they tended to lack descriptions of socially important experiences. Colum hence also left out two works as too lengthy, these being The Narrative of Arthur Gordon Pym of Nantucket and "The Unparalleled Adventure of One Hans Pfaall".

Colum's 1908 collection of Poe's tales was published as a book specifically aimed at the general reading public by the influential publishing house of Geoffrey Newnes Ltd. using its Home Library Book Company, as part of "John O'London's" Home Library.

== Publication history ==
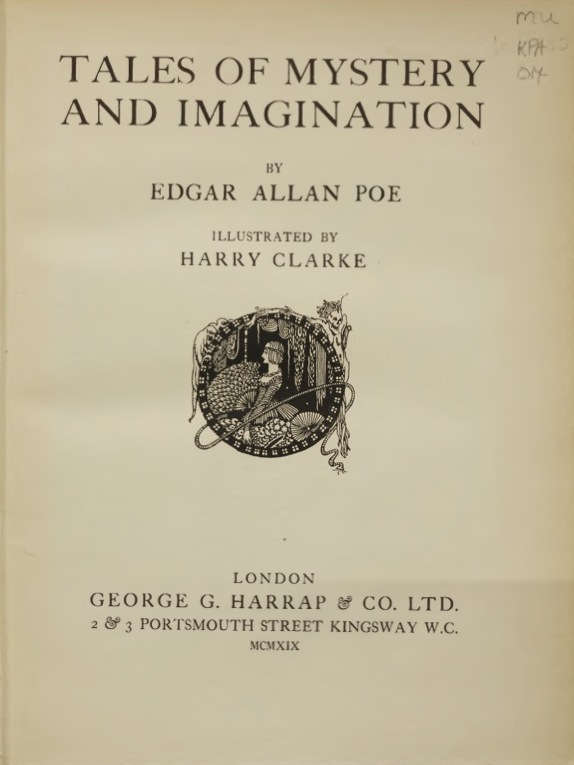
Frontispiece from a 1919 edition; artwork by Harry Clarke.

The 1908 version of Tales of Mystery and Imagination has been reproduced many times since under this same title by several publishers across the world for over 100 years, and Colum's selection of tales forms the backbone of subsequent versions under this same name. Everyman's Library produced their own copies of the 1908 version for several decades. The title of the 1908 book, together with its formula of compiling Poe's most bewildering tales into a single volume, continues to be used by other publishers. For instance, Pan Macmillan published an edition in 2016.

In 1919, London's George G. Harrap and Co. published an edition illustrated by Harry Clarke in black and white. In 1923, an expanded edition was released with many more illustrations, including eight color plates. In 1935, English illustrator Arthur Rackham produced another illustrated version of Tales of Mystery and Imagination.

In 1990, despite not being a novel, Tales of Mystery and Imagination was ranked at 23rd place in The Top 100 Crime Novels of All Time, a ranking by the members (all crime writers) of the Crime Writers' Association in Britain. A similar ranking was made in 1995 by the Mystery Writers of America, putting this novel in 3rd place.

== Stories ==
The following list of stories was included in the Everyman's Library edition, first published in 1908:

- "William Wilson"
- "A Tale of the Ragged Mountains"
- "The Domain of Arnheim"
- "Landor's Cottage"
- "The Elk"
- "The Island of the Fay"
- "The Sphinx"
- "The Gold-Bug"
- "The Man of the Crowd"
- "Shadow"
- "Silence"
- "The Collquy of Monos and Una"
- "The Conversation of Eiros and Charmion"
- "The Fall of the House of Usher"
- "Ligeia"
- "Eleonora"
- "Berenice"
- "Morella"
- "The Oval Portrait"
- "King Pest"
- "The Masque of the Red Death"
- "The Cask of Amontillado"
- "Metzengerstein"
- "The Pit and the Pendulum"
- "Hop-Frog"
- "A Descent into the Maelström"
- "MS. Found in a Bottle"
- "The Premature Burial"
- "The Facts in the Case of M. Valdemar"
- "The Tell-Tale Heart"
- "Mellonta Tauta"
- "The Thousand-and-Second Tale of Scheherazade"
- "The Oblong Box"
- "The Spectacles"
- "X-ing a Paragrab"
- "The Imp of the Perverse"
- "The Balloon-Hoax"
- "The Murders in the Rue Morgue"
- "The Mystery of Marie Rogêt"
- "The Purloined Letter"
- "Thou Art the Man"
- "Loss of Breath"
- "Bon-Bon"
- "The Devil in the Belfry"
- "The Black Cat"

== Adaptations ==
A musical album entitled Tales of Mystery and Imagination by The Alan Parsons Project uses the same title. It contains tracks based on three of these tales and several others, including poetry, with some narration by Orson Welles. Alan Parsons Project also used the title "The Gold Bug" for a track on their The Turn of a Friendly Card album.The title, and Poe himself, are also mentioned in the Van Morrison song "Fair Play" from the album Veedon Fleece.

== See also ==
- Harry Clarke - Darkness In Light, a documentary film on an illustrator of this collection.
- Edgar Allan Poe in television and film
