= The Philosophy of Furniture =

1840 essay by Edgar Allan Poe on interior decoration

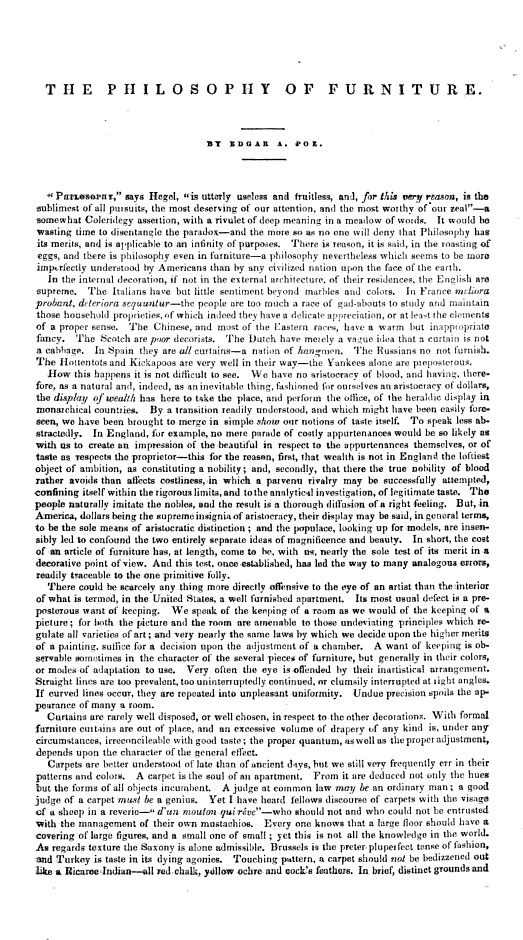
First page of "The Philosophy of Furniture", as published in Burton's Gentleman's Magazine, May 1840 issue

"The Philosophy of Furniture" is an essay written by American author Edgar Allan Poe and published in 1840. It presents Poe's theories on interior decorating.

== Overview ==
Poe begins by suggesting that the English are the "supreme" examples of internal decoration, above the Italians, French, Chinese, Scotch, Dutch, Spanish and Russians. "Yankees", he says, "are preposterous". He blames this American failing on a lack of aristocracy by blood, having instead "an aristocracy of dollars". Because of that, decoration in America has become a "mere parade of costly appurtenances" to create an "impression of the beautiful". He contrasts this with England, where wealth is not the loftiest ambition to constitute "nobility".

As a result, Poe says, "there could be nothing more directly offensive to the eye of an artist than the interior of what is termed in the United States... a well-furnished apartment". Because decorating rooms is a form of art, it should be judged similarly to any other work of art. The elements of a room should work well together, just as in a painting.

Poe begins giving his advice, starting with curtains. Excessive drapery, he says, is "irreconcilable with good taste". Curtains should be chosen based on the general character of the room. He puts strong emphasis on carpets, which he calls "the soul of the apartment". From the carpet, the colors and forms of the rest of the room can be determined. He recommends patterns "of no meaning". as "the abomination of flowers or representations of well-known objects of any kind should not be endured". Carpets, curtains, tapestry, or even ottoman coverings and upholstery of any kind should be "rigidly Arabesque". Gaudy patterns "glorious with all hues" are a cloth version of a kaleidoscope and only serve worshipers of Mammon.

Gas lighting is "inadmissible", Poe says, because it is harsh and unsteady. "No one having both brains and eyes will use it", he says. He also dismisses large chandeliers as "the quintessence of all that is false in taste or preposterous in folly".

In the essay, Poe continued his criticism of the country lacking aesthetic taste and attributed excess in American homes to a deterioration in values and further expressed a concern for pursuit of dollars and rank in American society.

== Poe's ideal room ==
Poe's ideal room, he says, is oblong, about thirty feet long and twenty-five feet wide. It should have only one door, not too wide, with two windows on another side. The windows should be large, to the floor, and open into a veranda, with rose wood frames, "more massive than usual". A double-layer of silver and "exceedingly rich crimson silk" with gold-colored ropes tying them open. Those tints of crimson and gold, he says, should be echoed throughout the room to determine its "character". The carpet in particular should match these tones.

The walls should be papered in a silver gray with small, crimson Arabesque designs. On the walls should hang relatively large paintings, "chiefly landscapes", and three or four portraits of women with "ethereal beauty", painted in the manner of Thomas Sully and hung flat on the walls, not with cords. Only one mirror should be included in the room and it should be circular and hung "so that a reflection of the person can be obtained from it in none of the ordinary sitting-places of the room".

He also calls for two large sofas with crimson silk decorated with a modest gold flower pattern with matching "conversation chairs". A rose-wood pianoforte should be left with keys visible. The room should also have an octagonal marble table, left uncovered. He also recommends "two or three hundred magnificently bound books".

== Publication history ==
"The Philosophy of Furniture" was first published in the May 1840 issue of Burton's Gentleman's Magazine. It was later republished in the Broadway Journal on May 3, 1845, as "House of Furniture". It was written during a period in which Poe produced a wide range of works from "extremes of high discourse and slapstick", according to biographer Kenneth Silverman, that included "The Conversation of Eiros and Charmion", "The Business Man", and "The Man That Was Used Up".

== In popular culture ==
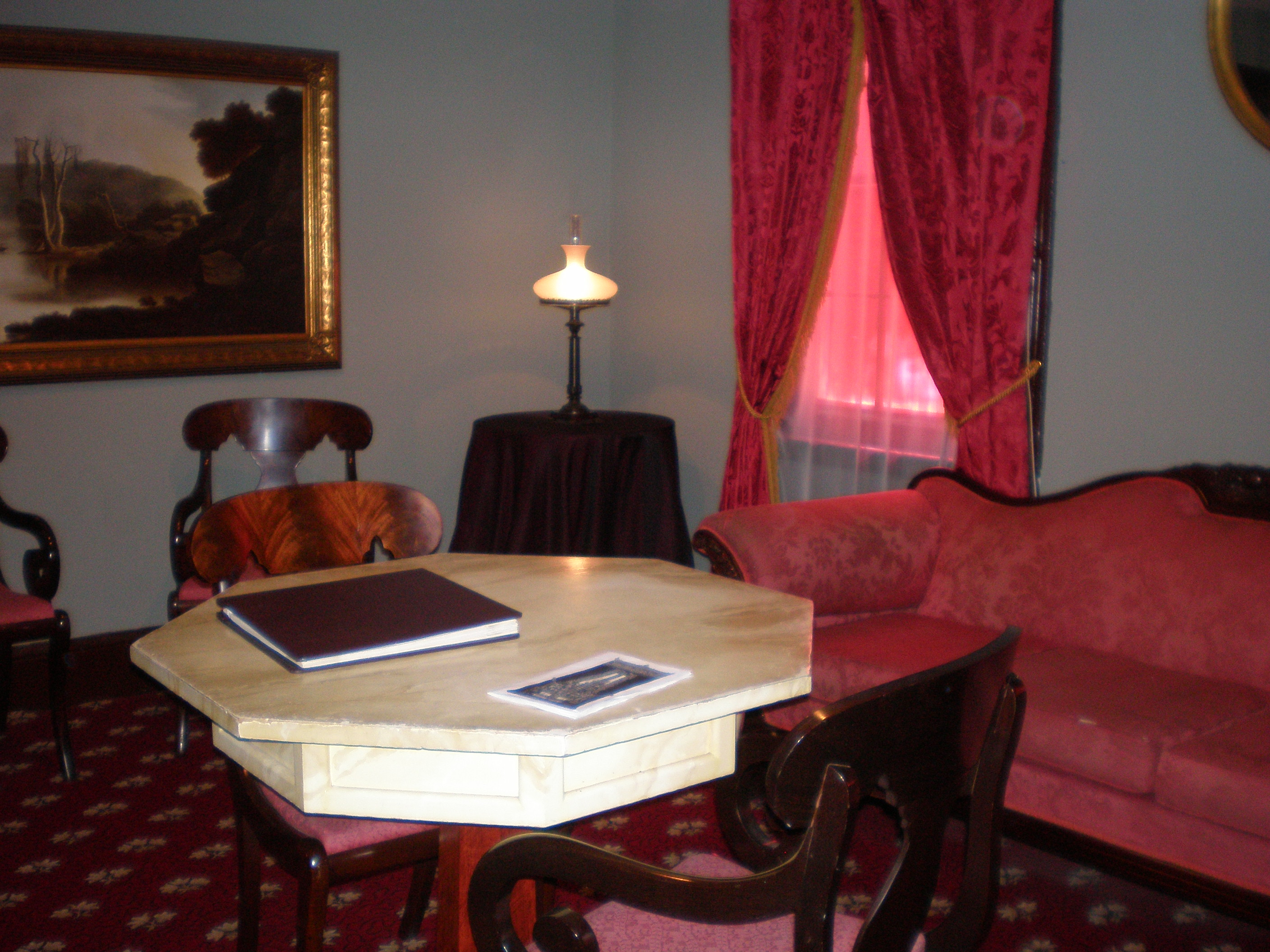
The Reading Room at the Edgar Allan Poe National Historic Site recreates "The Philosophy of Furniture".

The Edgar Allan Poe National Historic Site in Philadelphia, Pennsylvania has recreated a room based on "The Philosophy of Furniture". It is the only furnished room at the site. Referred to as the "Reading Room", it also contains Poe's collected works (some works in other languages) and audio inspired by Poe. The room includes a reproduction of a painting by Sully and an eight-sided table, as Poe recommends.

Roberto Bolaño's 1996 work Nazi Literature in the Americas cites Poe's "The Philosophy of Furniture" in its entry on the work of fictional Argentine poet Edelmira Thompson de Mendiluce. The entry describes her creation of a book entitled Poe's Room. This piece takes Poe's essay as its point of departure, leading to Mendiluce's creation of an imperfect replica of the room at her Azul ranch. The original essay, as well as her subsequent process of interpretation of its guidelines and the final, somewhat altered result, are dealt with therein.
