= Tales of the Grotesque and Arabesque =

1840 book by Edgar Allan Poe

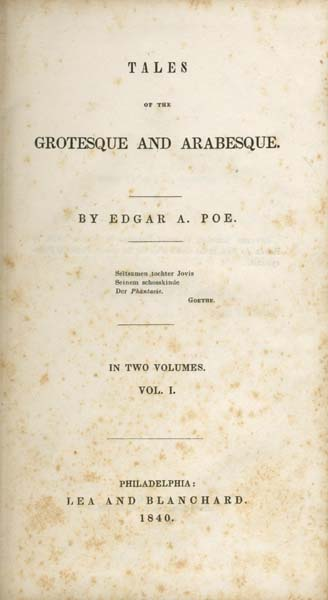
- Title page for volume I
- Author: Edgar Allan Poe
- Language: English
- Genre: Horror short stories and satire
- Publisher: Lea & Blanchard
- Publication date: 1840
- Publication place: United States

Tales of the Grotesque and Arabesque is a collection of previously published short stories by Edgar Allan Poe, first published in 1840.

== Publication ==
It was published by the Philadelphia firm Lea & Blanchard and released in two volumes. The publisher was willing to print the collection based on the recent success of Poe's story "The Fall of the House of Usher". Even so, Lea & Blanchard would not pay Poe any royalties; his only payment was 20 free copies. Poe had sought Washington Irving to endorse the book, writing to him, "If I could be permitted to add even a word or two from yourself... my fortune would be made".

In his preface, Poe wrote the now-famous quote defending himself from the criticism that his tales were part of "Germanism". He wrote, "If in many of my productions terror has been the thesis, I maintain that terror is not of Germany but of the soul".

The collection was dedicated to Colonel William Drayton, anonymous author of The South Vindicated from the Treason and Fanaticism of the Northern Abolitionists (Philadelphia: H. Manly, 1836), whom Poe likely met while stationed in Charleston, South Carolina; when Drayton moved to Philadelphia, Pennsylvania, Poe continued to correspond with him. Drayton was a former member of Congress turned judge and may have subsidized the book's publication.

== Critical response ==
Contemporary reviews were mixed. The anonymous critic in the Boston Notion suggested that Poe's work was better suited for readers of the future; people of the time should consider it "below the average of newspaper trash... wild, unmeaning, pointless, aimless... without anything of elevated fancy or fine humor". Alexander's Weekly Messenger, on the other hand, remarked that the stories were the "playful effusion of a remarkable and powerful intellect". Likewise, the New York Mirror complimented the author's intellectual capacity, his vivid descriptions, and his opulent imagination. Even with those positive reviews, the edition did not sell well. When Poe requested a second release in 1841 with eight additional tales included, the publisher declined.

== "Grotesque" and "Arabesque" ==
When its publication was announced in Burton's Gentleman's Magazine, its one-line description said that its title "pretty well indicates their [stories'] character". There has been some debate, however, over the meaning of Poe's terms "Grotesque" and "Arabesque". Poe probably had seen the terms used by Sir Walter Scott in his essay "On the Supernatural in Fictitious Composition". Both terms refer to a type of Islamic art used to decorate walls, especially in mosques. These art styles are known for their complex nature. Poe had used the term "arabesque" in this sense in his essay "The Philosophy of Furniture".

Poe may have been using these terms as subdivisions of Gothic art or Gothic architecture in an attempt to establish similar subdivisions in Gothic fiction. For example, the "grotesque" stories are those where the character becomes a caricature or satire, as in "The Man That Was Used Up". The "arabesque" stories focus on a single aspect of a character, often psychological, such as "The Fall of the House of Usher". A distant relative of Poe, modern scholar Harry Lee Poe, wrote that "grotesque" means "horror", which is gory and often disgusting, and "arabesque" means "terror", which forsakes the blood and gore for the sake of frightening the reader. Even so, accurately defining Poe's intentions for the terms is difficult and subdividing his tales into one category or another is even more difficult.

== Contents ==
Vol. I

- "Morella"
- "Lionizing"
- "William Wilson"
- "The Man That Was Used Up: A Tale of the Late Bugaboo and Kickapoo Campaign"
- "The Fall of the House of Usher"
- "The Duc de L'Omelette"
- "MS. Found in a Bottle"
- "Bon-Bon"
- "Shadow: A Parable"
- "The Devil in the Belfry"
- "Ligeia"
- "King Pest: A Tale Containing an Allegory"
- "The Signora Zenobia"
- "The Scythe of Time"

Vol. II

- "Epimanes"
- "Siope"
- "The Unparalleled Adventure of One Hans Pfaall"
- "A Tale of Jerusalem"
- "Von Jung"
- "Loss of Breath"
- "Metzengerstein"
- "Berenice"
- "Why the Little Frenchman Wears His Hand in a Sling"
- "The Visionary"
- "The Conversation of Eiros and Charmion"
- "Appendix" (to be appended to the "Hans Pfaall" story)

Poe later revised several of these tales and republished them under new titles:

"The Visionary" as "The Assignation"
"Siope: A Fable" as "Silence: A Fable"
"Von Jung" as "Mystification"
"The Signora Zenobia" as "How to Write a Blackwood Article"
"The Scythe of Time" as "A Predicament"
"Epimanes" as "Four Beasts in One: The Homo-Cameleopard"
"Shadow: A Fable" as "Shadow: A Parable"
