= The Business Man =

The Business Man or The Businessman may refer to:

- The Businessman (novel), a 1984 novel by Thomas M. Disch
- "The Business Man" (short story), an 1840 short story by Edgar Allan Poe
- An alternate name for the 1935 diesel-electric streamliner Flying Yankee

== See also ==
- Businessman (disambiguation)
