= Edgar Allan Poe National Historic Site =

House in Philadelphia, Pennsylvania

- Edgar Allan Poe House
- U.S. National Register of Historic Places
- U.S. National Historic Landmark
- U.S. National Historic Site
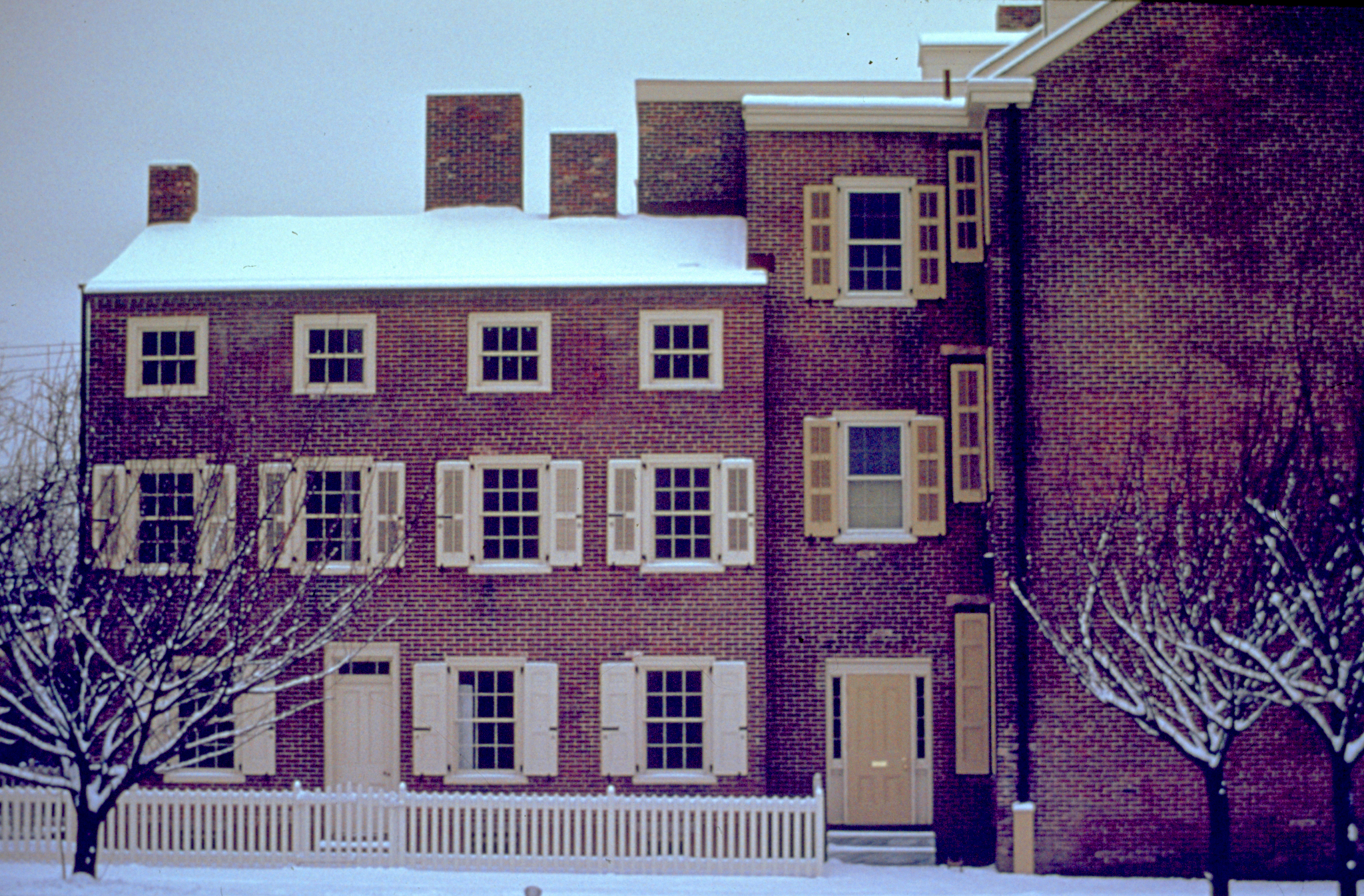
- Poe lived in the smaller section on the left; the larger section was built later and now serves as the building's entrance and visitor center.

- Location within Philadelphia Location within Pennsylvania Location within the United States
- Location: 532 N. 7th St., Philadelphia, Pennsylvania, U.S.
- Coordinates: 39°57′42″N 75°9′1″W
- Area: 0.52 acres (0.0021 km^{2})
- Built: 1842
- Architect: William Alburger, John Evans
- Visitation: 8,131 (2024)
- Website: Edgar Allan Poe National Historic Site
- NRHP reference No.: 66000689

Significant dates
- Added to NRHP: October 15, 1966
- Designated NHL: December 29, 1962

The Edgar Allan Poe National Historic Site is a preserved home once rented by American author Edgar Allan Poe, located at 532 N. 7th Street, in the Spring Garden neighborhood of Philadelphia, Pennsylvania. Though Poe lived in many houses over several years in Philadelphia (1838 to 1844), it is the only one which still survives. It was designated a National Historic Landmark in 1962.

== Poe's time in Philadelphia ==
Poe lived in at least three different locations in Philadelphia, including homes on Arch Street, on 16th and Locust Streets, and on Coates Street near 25th Street.

While living in Philadelphia, Poe published some of his most well-known works, including "The Tell-Tale Heart," "The Murders in the Rue Morgue," and "The Gold-Bug". It has been called his most prolific period. Poe published 31 stories during his time in Philadelphia as well as several literary criticism pieces, including his February 1841 review of Charles Dickens's novel Barnaby Rudge: A Tale of the Riots of 'Eighty.

In reviewing the novel, which inspired Poe's 1845 poem "The Raven", he correctly predicted the novel's resolution before its final serialized installment was published. Dickens is said to have remarked, "The man must be the devil". Poe's years in the city have been described as the happiest of his life.

== Home's history ==
The Historic Site is the only one of Poe's Philadelphia homes still standing and is located in the historical Spring Garden district on the northern edge of Philadelphia.

Poe rented the house early in 1843 and is believed to have lived there for about a year or less along with his wife Virginia and his aunt/mother-in-law Maria Clemm. It is uncertain when the family moved into the home, which was then at the corner of Seventh Street and Brandywine Alley (no longer extant) though believed to be some time before June. In a letter to James Russell Lowell dated June 20, 1843, Poe invites Lowell to visit him: "My address is 234 North Seventh St., above Spring Garden, West Side." The neighborhood was then predominantly made up of Quakers. Speculation as to which stories and poems were written in this home are unprovable, but suggestions include "A Tale of the Ragged Mountains", "The Balloon-Hoax", and "Eulalie".

Maria Clemm, Poe's mother-in-law and aunt, maintained the home for the small family. A neighbor later recalled: "Mrs. Clemm was always busy. I have seen her mornings clearing the front yard, washing the windows and the stoop, and even white-washing the palings. You would notice how clean and orderly everything looks." A visitor referred to the home as little more than a lean-to. Poe occasionally had difficulty paying rent, though the landlord, a plumber, was tolerant of this. The family moved out the first week in April 1844 and made their way to New York. The family's decision to move out of the home may have been prompted by Virginia's health, as she was struggling with tuberculosis.

Several families lived in the home after Poe until it was purchased by Richard Gimbel, son of the founder of Gimbels department store, in 1933. A fan of Poe, he refurbished the home and opened it as a museum. In his will, he left the property to the city of Philadelphia.

It was designated a National Historic Landmark in 1962. The National Park Service began overseeing the property in 1978, reopening the home to the public in 1980.

== Home today ==
The site combines both Poe's former residence and two adjoining houses which were not built until after Poe left Philadelphia. The rooms of the house are left in arrested decay and are not furnished to look like they did during Poe's time. The neighboring residences include a welcome area, gift shop, a film screening room, and some minor exhibits.

The site includes a reading room decorated based on Poe's theories in "The Philosophy of Furniture", which is the only room on the site furnished to look like it did in the 19th century,. This was not part of Poe's original home and is not meant to suggest Poe had a similarly decorated room. The room includes a complete collection of Poe's works, including criticism, and audio interpretations of his work. A statue outside of the home depicts a large raven, representative of one of Poe's most famous poems, "The Raven" (1845). The cellar in the house resembles one described in "The Black Cat" (1843), also written while Poe lived in Philadelphia. Though the house does not include any items originally owned by the Poe family, many items are collected nearby at the Free Library of Philadelphia.

The site is affiliated with the Independence National Historical Park and is estimated to receive 18,500 visitors annually. The home has been closed for fire safety upgrades since July 2024. Before the closure, the site was typically open Friday-Sunday, 9 AM to 5 PM (closed from noon to 1 PM) with scheduled guided tours or self-guided tours at any time. Admission is free. Paid membership in the Friends of Poe Society, which also sponsors events throughout the year, aids in the upkeep of the home.

== Photo gallery ==
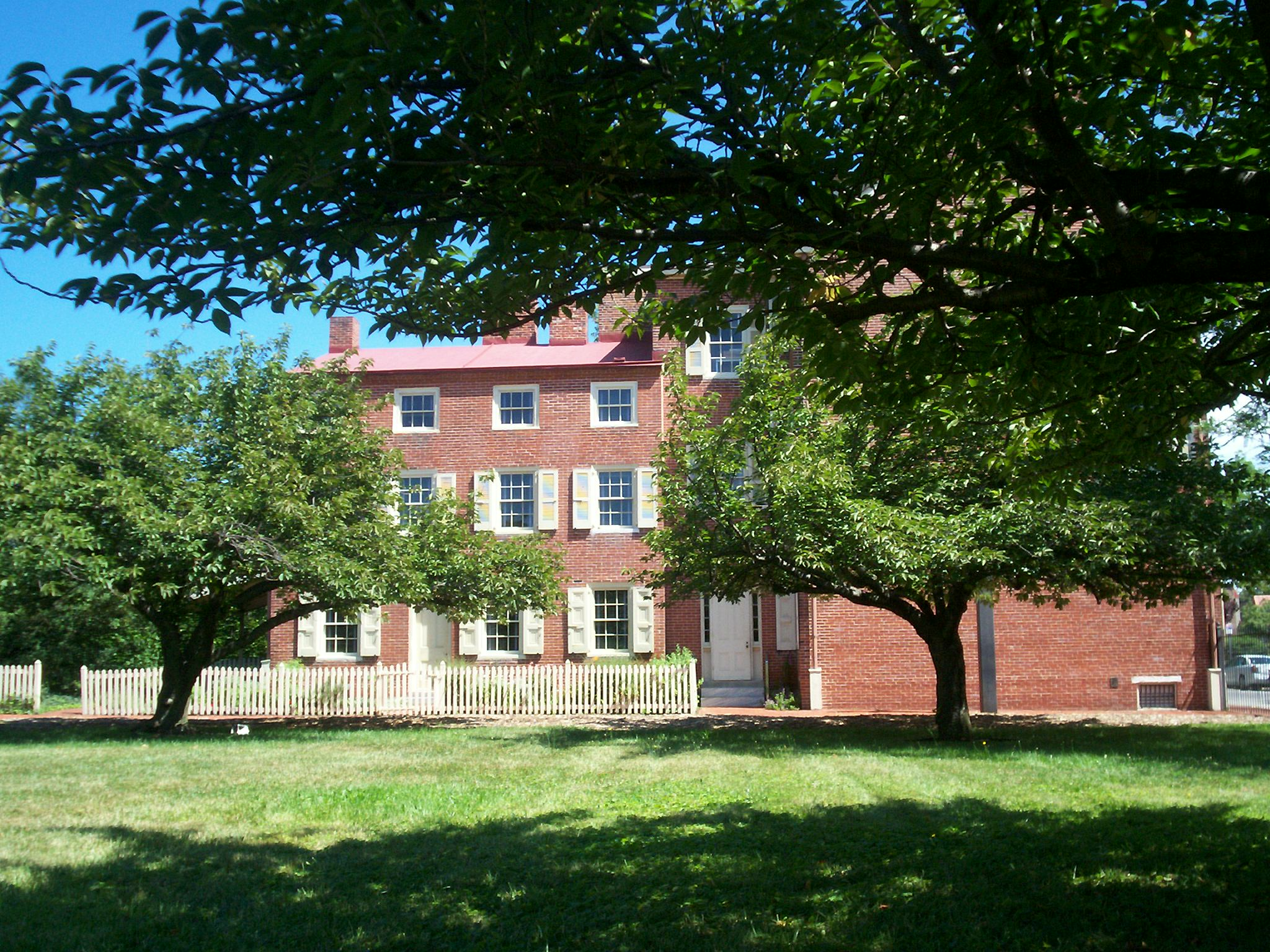
530-532 N. 7th St., Philadelphia, Pennsylvania, USA

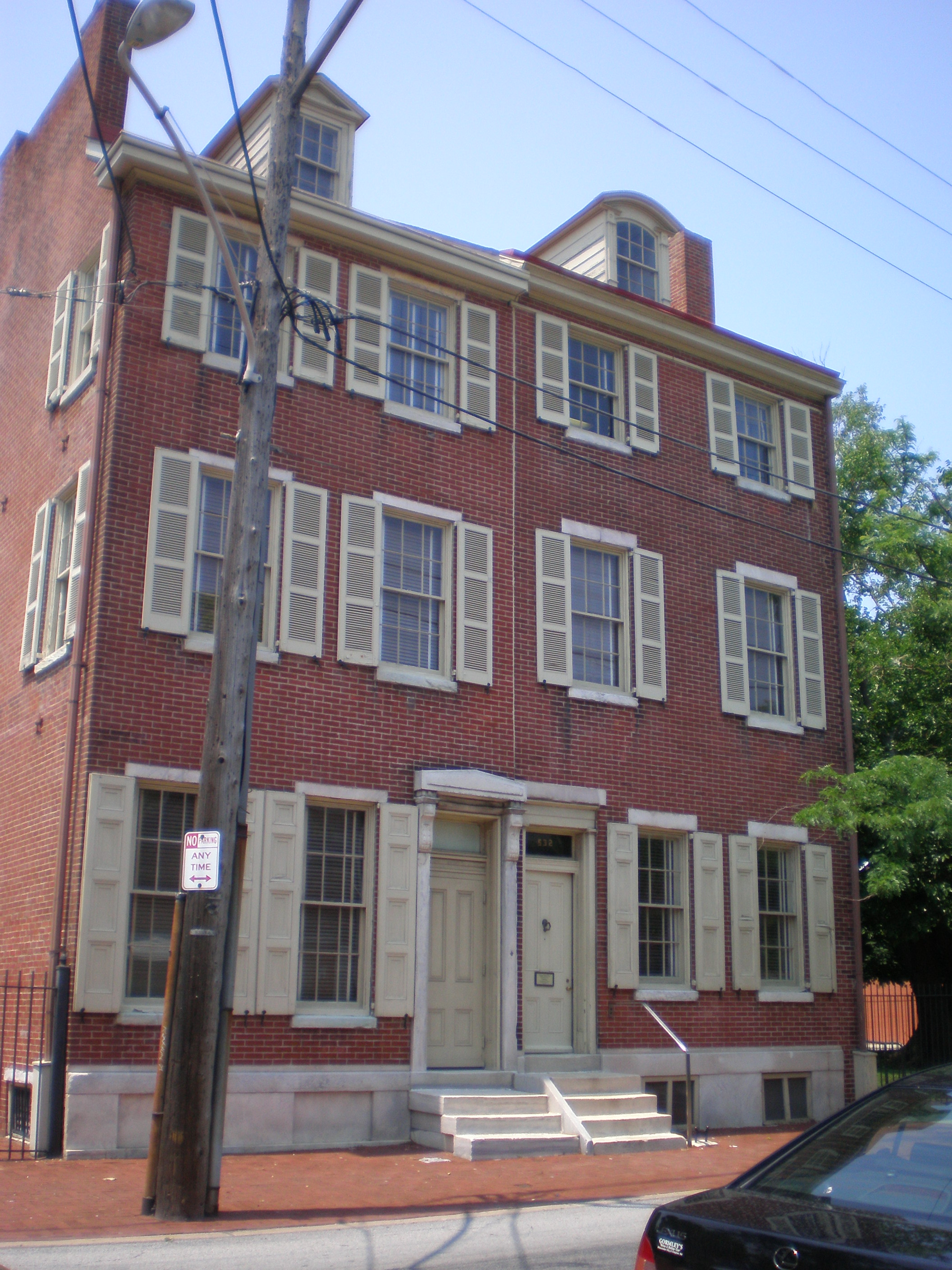
View of the Poe Historic Site from 7th Street. Visitors entrance is the door on the right.

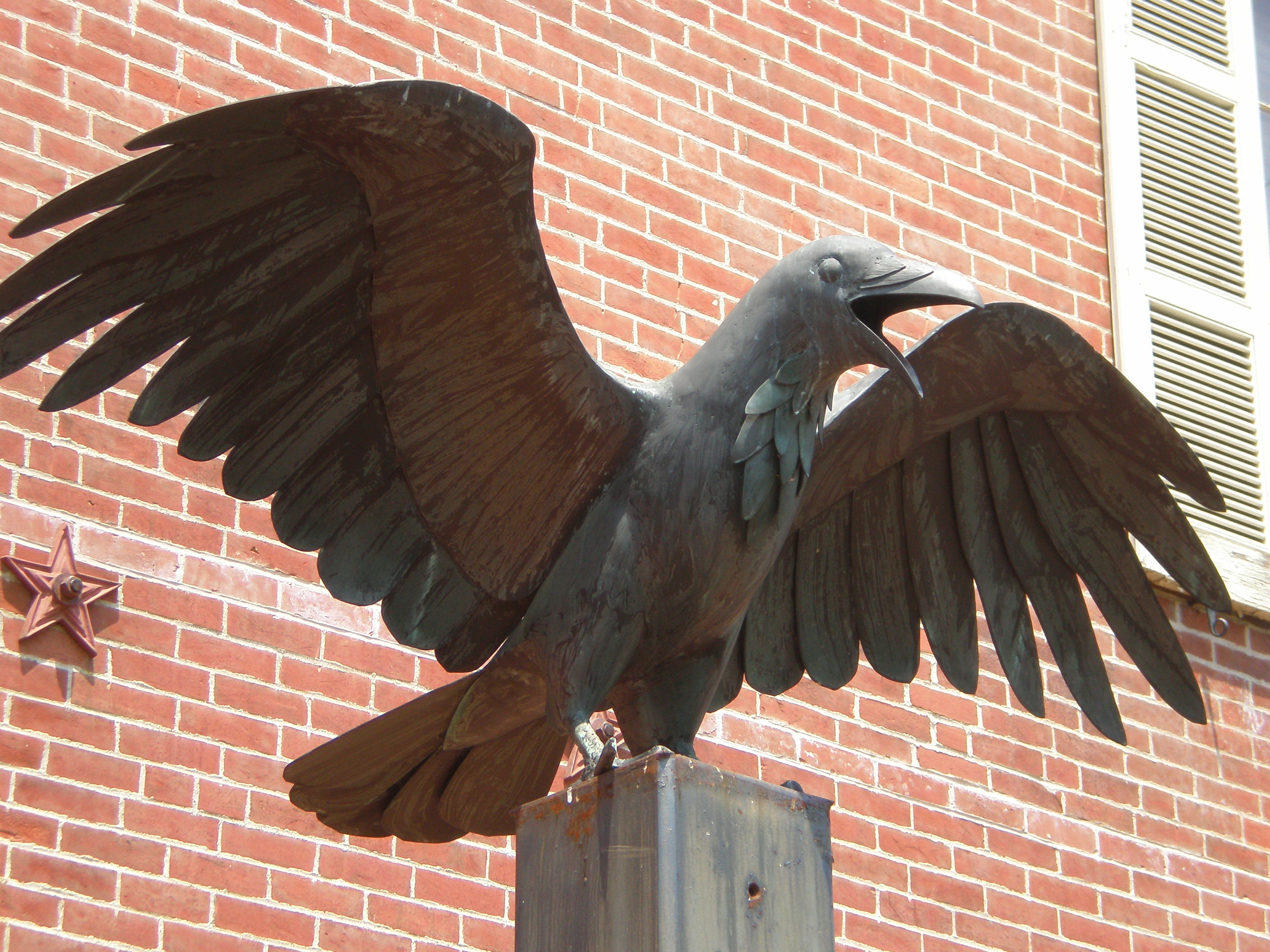
A detail of the raven statue outside the home.

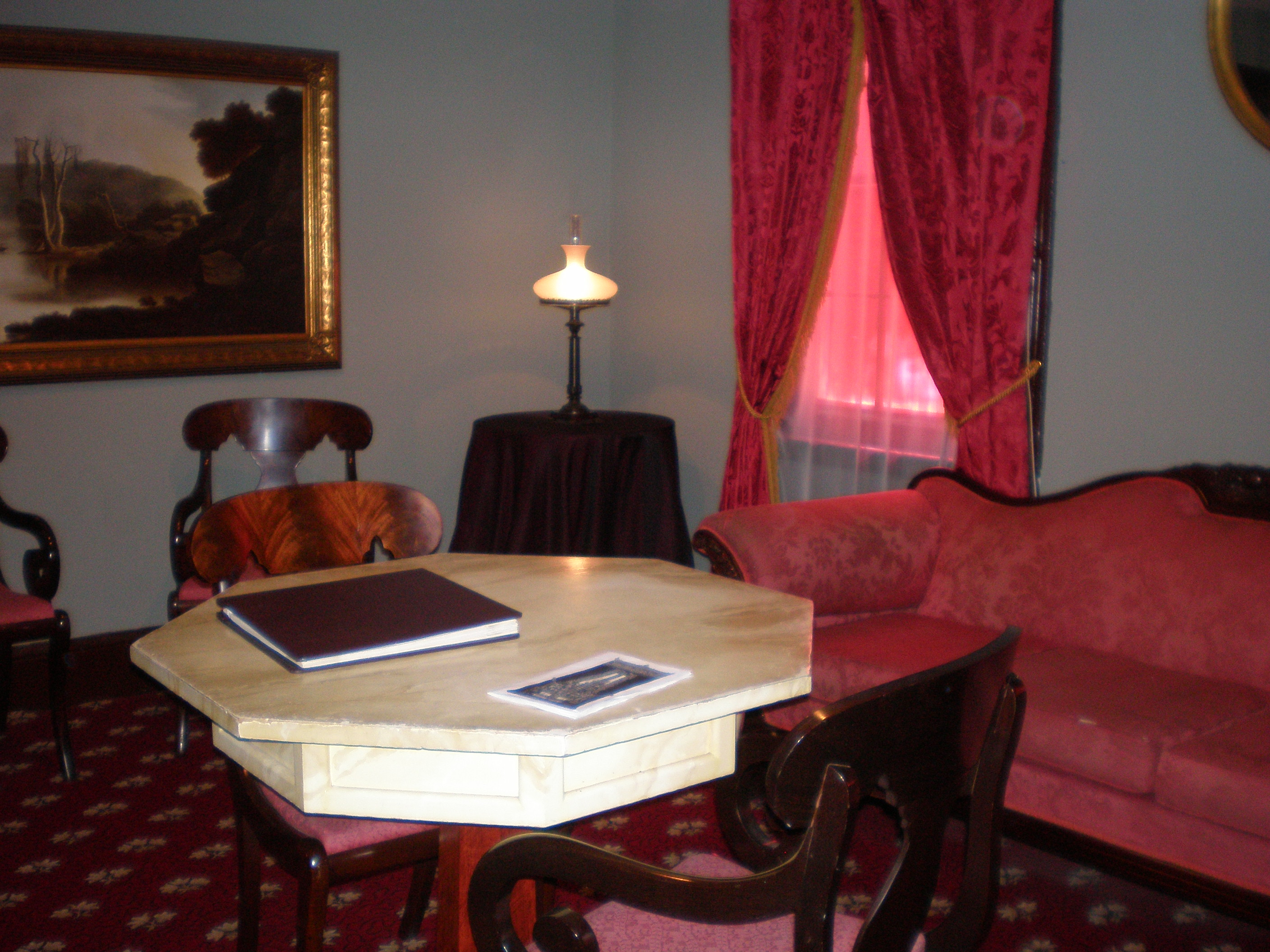
The reading room at the Poe National Historic Site, based on Poe's essay "The Philosophy of Furniture."

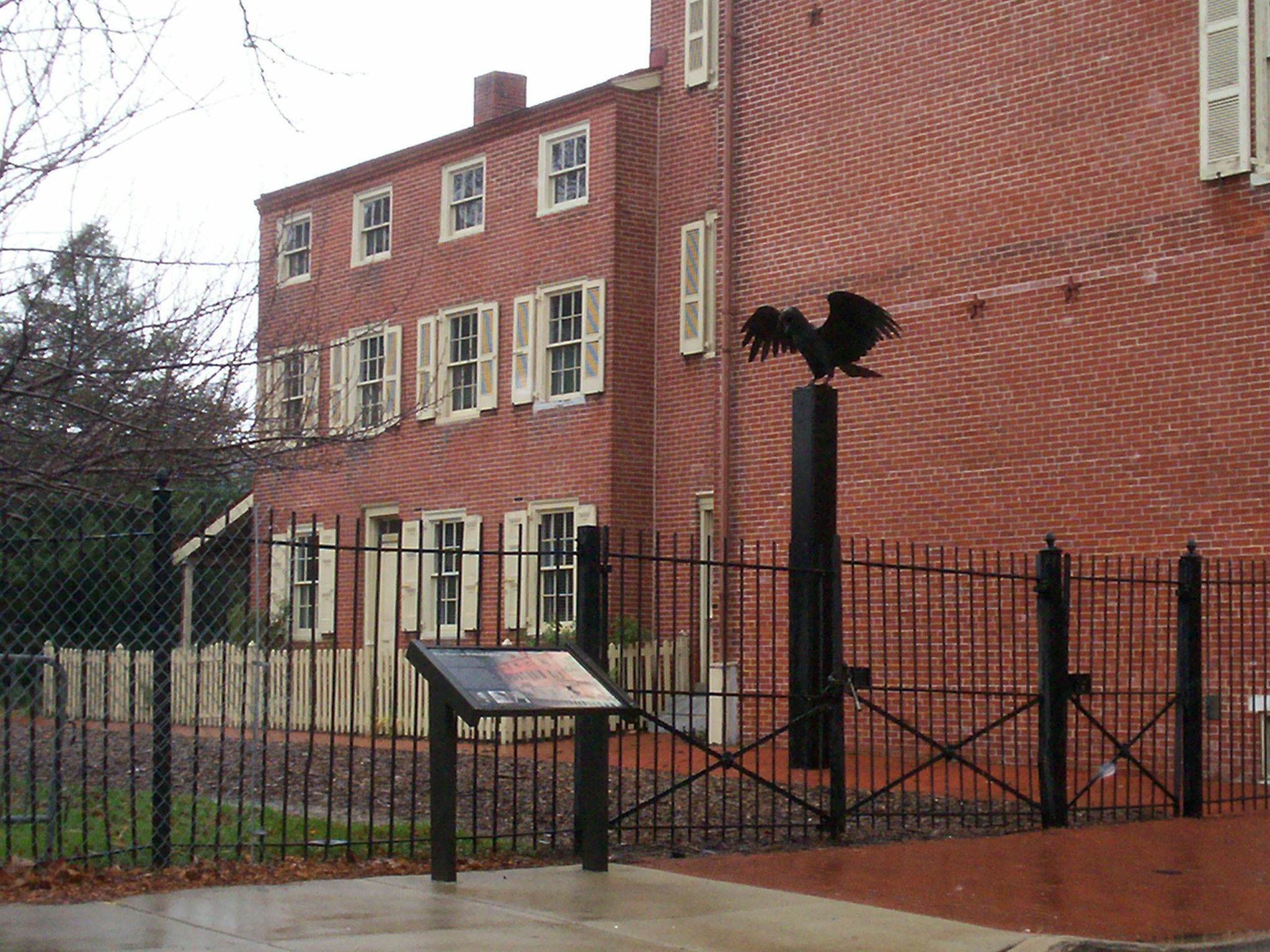
Edgar Allan Poe National Historic Site, as seen from N. 7th Street

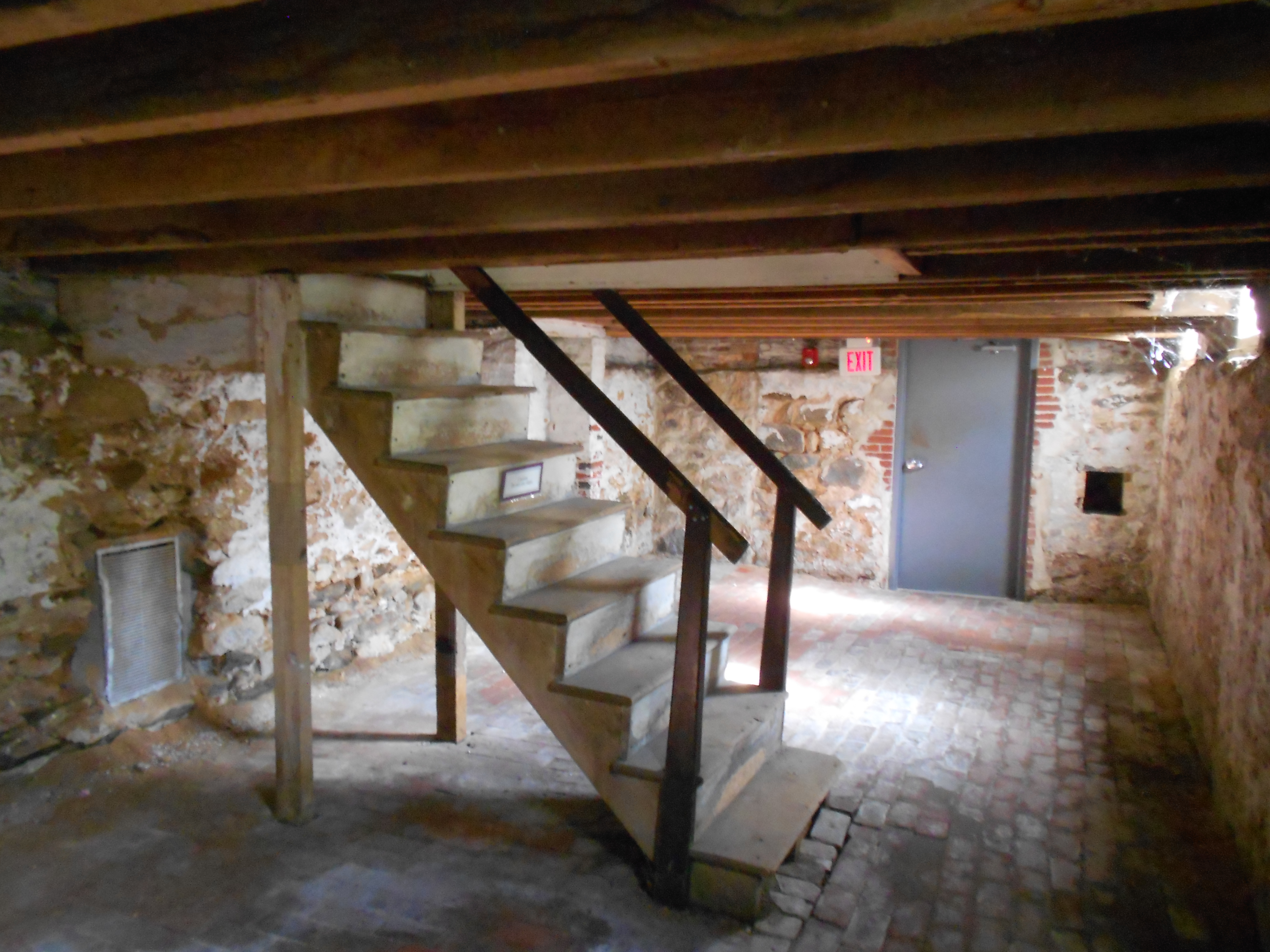
Basement of the house

== See also ==
- Edgar Allan Poe House and Museum in Baltimore
- Edgar Allan Poe Museum in Richmond, Virginia
- Edgar Allan Poe Cottage in the Bronx, New York City
- List of National Historic Landmarks in Philadelphia
- National Register of Historic Places listings in North Philadelphia
