= The Fall of the House of Usher =

1839 short story by Edgar Allan Poe

- Short story by Edgar Allan Poe
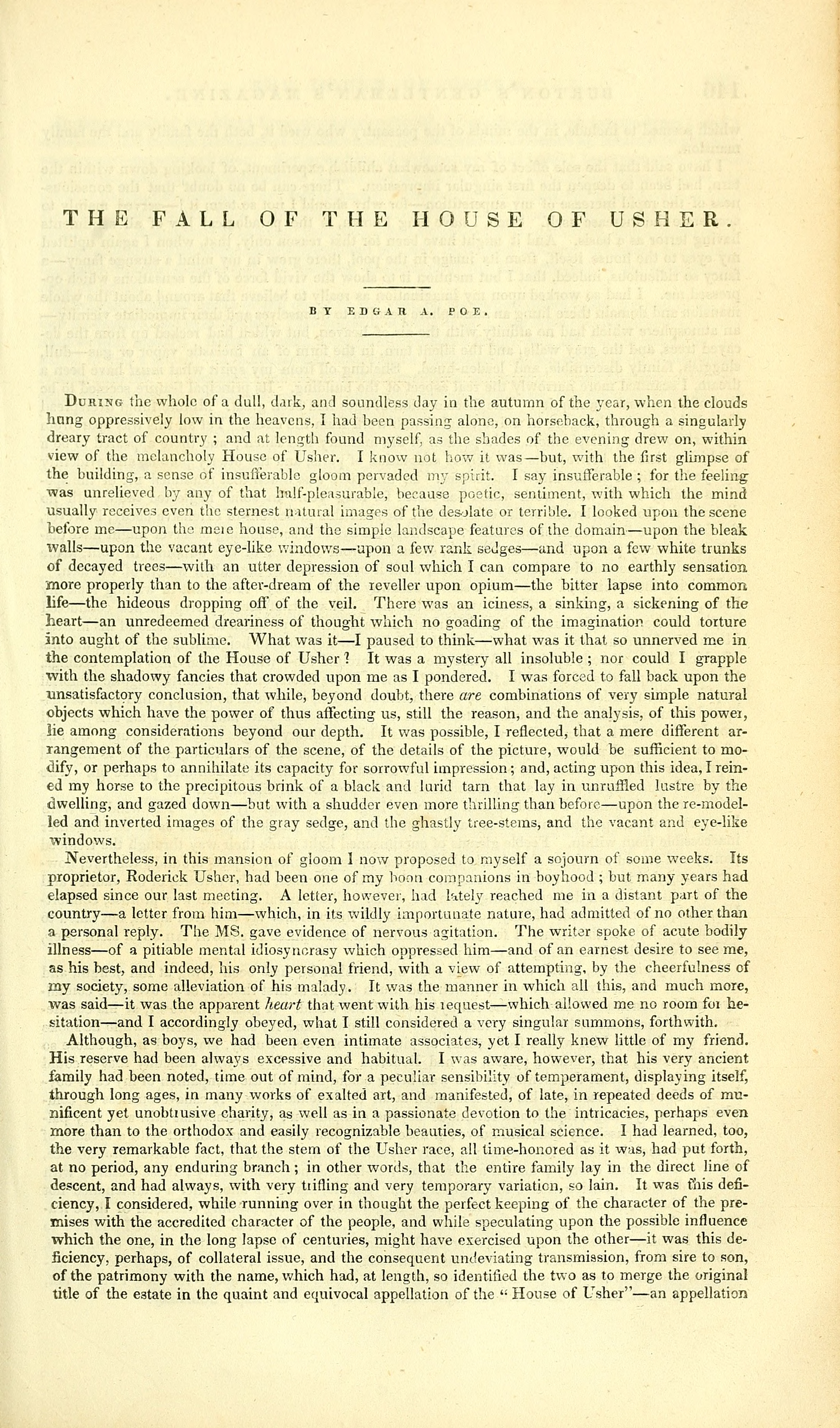
- First appearance in Burton's Gentleman's Magazine (September 1839)
- Country: United States
- Language: English
- Genres: Gothic, horror

Publication
- Published in: Burton's Gentleman's Magazine
- Publication date: September 1839

"The Fall of the House of Usher" is a short story by American writer Edgar Allan Poe, first published in 1839 in Burton's Gentleman's Magazine, then included in the collection Tales of the Grotesque and Arabesque in 1840. The short story, a work of Gothic fiction, includes themes of madness, family, isolation, and metaphysical identities.

The story features an unnamed narrator's visit to the decaying mansion of his childhood friend Roderick Usher and his sister Madeline. There, he learns of Roderick's illness and attempts to keep him entertained. Madeline dies and is buried and the narrator assists in putting her body in the family tomb within the mansion. Madeline, however, was still alive and escapes her tomb to seek revenge on her brother. The narrator flees the house as it collapses on the final members of the family.

"The Fall of the House of Usher" has become one of Poe's most well-known works of prose. It has been frequently adapted into various media.

== Plot ==
An unnamed narrator visits the family mansion of his childhood friend, Roderick Usher, having received a letter from him complaining of an illness and asking for his help. As he arrives, the narrator notices a thin crack extending from the roof, down the front of the house and into the adjacent tarn. Roderick's twin sister, Madeline, is also ill and falls into cataleptic, deathlike trances. Roderick and Madeline are the only remaining members of the Usher family.

The narrator is impressed with Roderick's paintings and attempts to cheer him by reading with him and listening to his improvised musical compositions on the guitar. Roderick sings "The Haunted Palace", then tells the narrator that he thinks the house he lives in to be alive, and that this sentience arises from the arrangement of the masonry and vegetation surrounding it. Further, Roderick believes that his fate is connected to the family mansion.

After Madeline apparently dies, Roderick insists that she be entombed for two weeks in the vault beneath the house before being permanently buried, fearing that her body will be exhumed for medical study. The narrator reluctantly aids him, and notes that Madeline's body has rosy cheeks, which sometimes appears in cadavers. Over the next week, both Roderick and the narrator find themselves increasingly agitated.

A storm begins, and Roderick comes to the narrator's bedroom (which is situated directly above the vault) in an almost hysterical state. Throwing the windows open to the storm, Roderick points out that the lake surrounding the house seems to glow in the dark, just as Roderick depicted in his paintings, but there is no lightning or other explainable source of the glow.

The narrator attempts to calm Roderick by reading aloud from a Medieval romance entitled The Mad Trist, a novel involving a knight named Ethelred who breaks into a hermit's dwelling in an attempt to escape an approaching storm, only to find a palace of gold guarded by a dragon. Ethelred also finds a shining brass shield hanging on a wall. Upon the shield is inscribed:

Who entereth herein, a conqueror hath bin;
Who slayeth the dragon, the shield he shall win;

Ethelred swings his mace at the dragon, which dies with a piercing shriek. When he attempts to take the shield from the wall, it falls to the floor with an unnerving clatter.

As the narrator reads of the knight's forcible entry into the dwelling, he and Roderick hear cracking and ripping sounds from somewhere in the house. When the dragon's death cries are described, a real shriek is heard, again within the house. As he relates the shield falling from off the wall, a hollow metallic reverberation can be heard throughout the house. At first, the narrator ignores the noises, but Roderick becomes increasingly hysterical. Roderick eventually declares that he has been hearing these sounds for days, and that they are being made by Madeline, who was in fact alive when she was entombed.

Madeline appears at the bedroom door, bloodied from her arduous escape from the tomb. In a final fit of rage, she attacks her brother, scaring him to death as she herself expires. Horrified, the narrator flees the mansion and sees a blood-red moon illuminating the widening crack in the house. The House of Usher splits in two and the fragments sink away into the tarn.

== Character descriptions ==
=== Narrator ===
In "The Fall of the House of Usher", Poe's unnamed narrator is called to visit the House of Usher by Roderick Usher, the narrator's childhood friend. As his "best and only friend," Roderick writes of his illness and asks that the narrator visit him. The narrator is persuaded by Roderick's desperation for companionship. Though sympathetic and helpful, the narrator is continually made to be an outsider, watching the narrative unfold without fully becoming a part of it. The narrator also exists as Roderick's audience as the men have not remained close. Roderick is convinced of his impending demise and the narrator is gradually drawn into this belief after being brought forth to witness the horrors and hauntings of the House of Usher.

From his arrival, the narrator notes the family's deep isolation, as well as the cryptic and special connection between Madeline and Roderick, the final living members of the Usher family. Throughout the tale and her varying states of consciousness, Madeline completely ignores the narrator's presence. After Roderick Usher claims that Madeline has died, the narrator helps Usher entomb Madeline in an underground vault despite noticing Madeline's flushed, lifelike appearance.

During one sleepless night, the narrator reads aloud to Usher as eerie sounds are heard throughout the mansion. He witnesses Madeline's reemergence and the subsequent, simultaneous death of the twins. The narrator is the only character to escape the House of Usher, which he views as it cracks and sinks into the mountain lake.

=== Roderick Usher ===
Roderick Usher is the twin of Madeline Usher and one of the last living members of the Usher family. Roderick writes to the narrator, his boyhood friend, about an ongoing illness. When the narrator arrives, he is startled to see Roderick's eerie and off-putting appearance. He is described by the narrator as having:

gray-white skin; eyes large and full of light; lips not bright in color, but of a beautiful shape; a well-shaped nose; hair of great softness — a face that was not easy to forget. And now the increase in this strangeness of his face had caused so great a change that I almost did not know him. The horrible white of his skin, and the strange light in his eyes, surprised me and even made me afraid. His hair had been allowed to grow, and in its softness, it did not fall around his face but seemed to lie upon the air. I could not, even with an effort, see in my friend the appearance of a simple human being.

Roderick Usher is a recluse. He is unwell both physically and mentally. In addition to his constant fear and trepidation, Madeline's catalepsy contributes to his decay as he is tormented by the sorrow of watching his sibling die. The narrator states:

He admitted ... that much of the peculiar gloom which thus affected him could be traced ... to the evidently approaching dissolution of ... his sole companion.

According to Terry W. Thompson, Roderick meticulously plans for Madeline's burial to prevent "resurrection men" from stealing his beloved sister's corpse for dissection, study, or experimentation as was common in the 18th and 19th centuries for medical schools and physicians in need of cadavers.

Roderick and Madeline are twins and the two share an incommunicable connection that critics conclude may be either incestuous or metaphysical, as two individuals in an extra-sensory relationship embodying a single entity. To that end, Roderick's deteriorating condition speeds his own torment and eventual death.

Like Madeline, Roderick is connected to the mansion, the titular House of Usher. He believes the mansion is sentient and responsible, in part, for his deteriorating mental health and melancholy. Despite this admission, Usher remains in the mansion and composes art containing the Usher mansion or similar haunted mansions. His mental health deteriorates faster as he begins to hear Madeline's attempts to escape the underground vault she was buried in, and he eventually meets his death out of fear in a manner similar to the House of Usher's cracking and sinking.

=== Madeline Usher ===
Madeline Usher is the twin sister of Roderick Usher. She is deathly ill and cataleptic. She appears near the narrator, but never acknowledges his presence. She returns to her bedroom where Roderick claims she has died. The narrator and Roderick place her in a tomb despite her flushed, lively appearance. In the tale's conclusion, Madeline escapes from the tomb and returns to Roderick, scaring him to death.

According to Poe's detective methodology in literature, Madeline Usher may be the physical embodiment of the supernatural and metaphysical worlds. Her limited presence is explained as a personification of Roderick's torment and fear. Madeline does not appear until she is summoned through her brother's fear, foreshadowed in the epigraph, with a quote from French poet Pierre-Jean de Béranger: "Son cœur est un luth suspendu; / Sitôt qu'on le touche il résonne", meaning "His heart is a suspended lute; as soon as one touches it, it resonates".

== Publication history ==
"The Fall of the House of Usher" was first published in September 1839 in Burton's Gentleman's Magazine. It was revised slightly in 1840 for the collection Tales of the Grotesque and Arabesque. It contains Poe's poem "The Haunted Palace", which earlier was published separately in the April 1839 issue of Baltimore Museum.

In 1928, Éditions Narcisse, predecessor to the Black Sun Press, published a limited edition of 300 numbered copies with illustrations by Alastair.

== Sources of inspiration ==
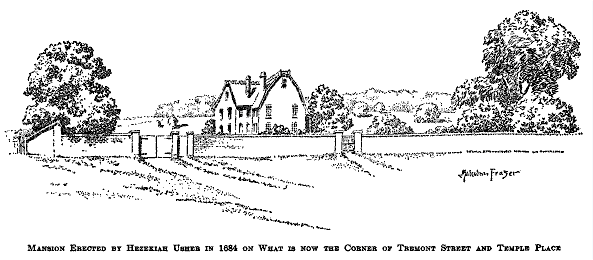
Home of Hezekiah Usher's son, Hezekiah

Poe's inspiration for the story may be based upon events of the Hezekiah Usher House, which was located on the Usher estate that is now a three-block area in downtown modern Boston, Massachusetts. Adjacent to Boston Common and bounded by Tremont Street to the northwest, Washington Street to the southeast, Avery Street to the south and Winter Street to the north, the house was constructed in 1684 and either torn down or relocated in 1830.

Another source of inspiration may be from an actual couple, Mr. and Mrs. Luke Usher, the friends and acting colleagues of his mother Eliza Poe. The couple took care of Eliza's three children (including Poe) during her time of illness and eventual death.

German writer E.T.A. Hoffmann, who was a role model and inspiration for Poe, published the story "Das Majorat" in 1819. There are many similarities between the two stories, including the physical breaking of a house, eerie sounds in the night, the story within a story and the house owner being called Roderich or Roderick. Because Poe was familiar with Hoffmann's works, he knew the story and drew from it using the elements for his own purposes.

Another German author, Heinrich Clauren's, 1812 story "Das Raubschloß", as translated into English by Joseph Hardman and published in Blackwood's Magazine in 1828 as "The Robber's Tower", may have served as an inspiration, according to Arno Schmidt and Thomas Hansen. As well as its sharing common elements, such as a young woman with a fear of premature burial interred in a sepulcher directly beneath the protagonist's chamber, stringed instruments, and the living twin of the buried girl, Diane Hoeveler identifies textual evidence of Poe's use of the story, and concludes that the inclusion of Vigiliae Mortuorum secundum Chorum Ecclesiae Maguntinae (Vigils for the Dead according to the Use of the Church of Mainz) is drawn from the use of a similarly obscure book in "The Robber's Tower".

The theme of the crumbling, haunted castle is a key feature of Horace Walpole's Castle of Otranto (1764), which largely contributed in defining the Gothic genre.

== Analysis ==
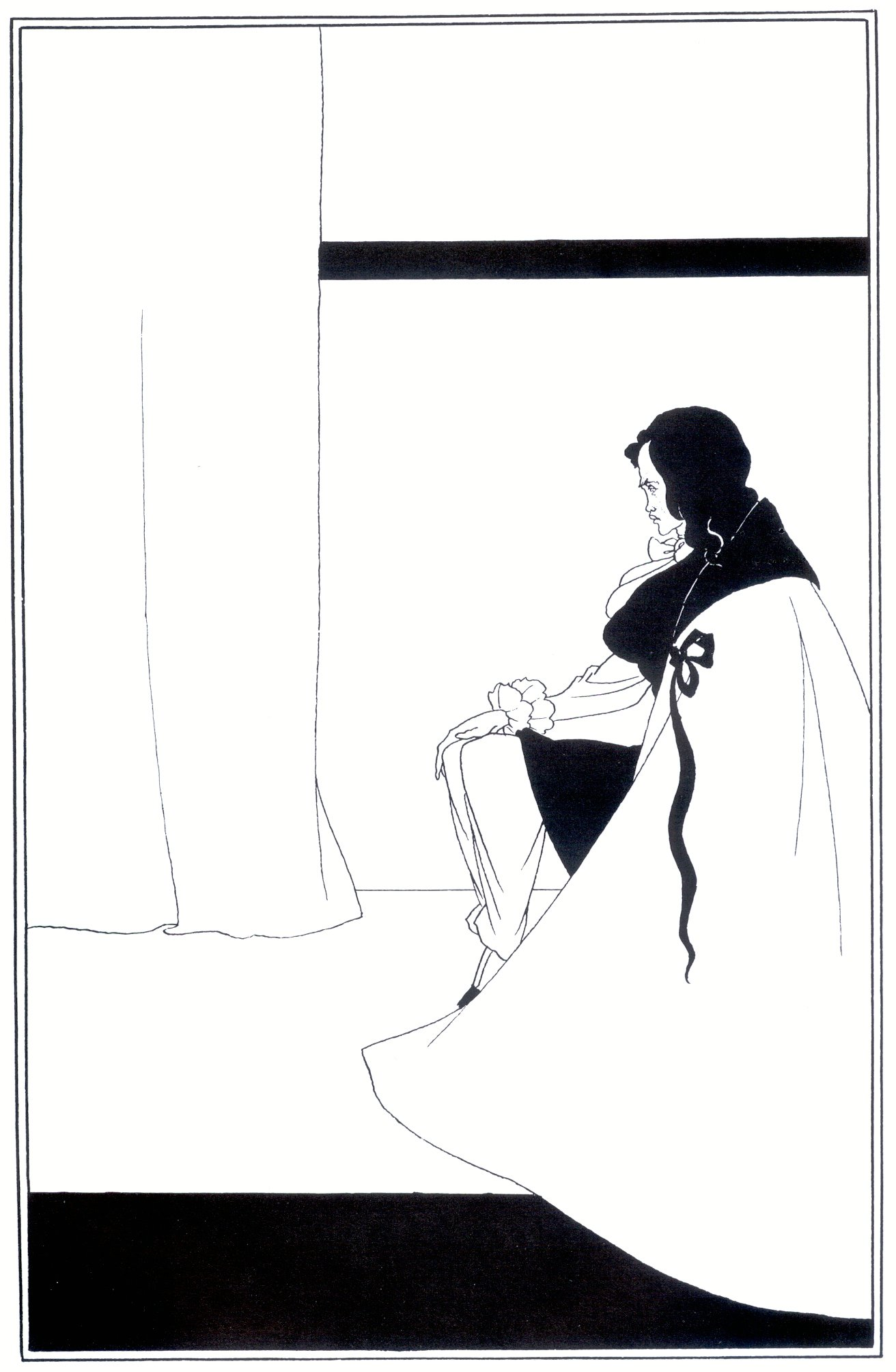
1894 illustration by Aubrey Beardsley.

"The Fall of the House of Usher" is considered the best example of Poe's "totality", wherein every element and detail is related and relevant.

The presence of a capacious, disintegrating house symbolizing the destruction of the human body continues to be a characteristic element in Poe's later work.

"The Fall of the House of Usher" shows Poe's ability to create an emotional tone in his work, specifically emphasizing feelings of fear, impending doom, and guilt. These emotions center on Roderick Usher, who, like many Poe characters, suffers from an unnamed disease. Like the narrator in "The Tell-Tale Heart", this disease inflames Roderick's hyperactive senses. The illness manifests physically but is based in Roderick's mental or even moral state. He is sick, it is suggested, because he expects to be sick based on his family's history of illness and is, therefore, essentially a hypochondriac. Similarly, he buries his sister alive because he expects to bury her alive, creating his own self-fulfilling prophecy.

The House of Usher, itself doubly referring both to the actual structure and the family, plays a significant role in the story. It is the first "character" that the narrator introduces to the reader, presented with a humanized description: Its windows are described as "eye-like" twice in the first paragraph. The fissure that develops in its side is symbolic of the decay of the Usher family and the house "dies" along with the two Usher siblings. This connection was emphasized in Roderick's poem "The Haunted Palace", which seems to be a direct reference to the house that foreshadows doom.

L. Sprague de Camp in his Lovecraft: A Biography wrote that "[a]ccording to the late [Poe expert] Thomas O. Mabbott, H.P. Lovecraft, in 'Supernatural Horror', solved a problem in the interpretation of Poe" by arguing that "Roderick Usher, his sister Madeline, and the house all shared one common soul".

The plot of this tale has prompted many critics to analyze it as a description of the human psyche, comparing, for instance, the House to the unconscious, and its central crack to a split personality. An incestuous relationship between Roderick and Madeline never is explicitly stated, but may be implied by the attachment between the two siblings.

Opium, which Poe mentions several times in both his prose and poems, is mentioned twice in the tale. The gloomy sensation occasioned by the dreary landscape around the Usher mansion is compared by the narrator to the sickness caused by the withdrawal symptoms of an opiate-addict. The narrator also describes Roderick Usher's appearance as that of an "irreclaimable eater of opium".

While there are no direct statements supporting their conclusions, scholars have demonstrated the language deployed by Roderick to describe his sister as full of hints of the possible incestuous relationship between the twins. They argue that this perversion is the actual cause of the fall of the house as well as an end to the lineage of Ushers.

=== Allusions and references ===
- The opening epigraph quotes "Le Refus" (1831) by the French songwriter Pierre-Jean de Béranger, translated to English as "his heart is a suspended lute, as soon as it is touched, it resounds". Béranger's original text reads "Mon cœur" (my heart) and not "Son cœur" (his/her heart).
- The narrator describes one of Usher's musical compositions as a "singular perversion and amplification of the wild air of the last waltz of Von Weber". Poe here refers to a popular piano work of his time – which, though going by the title "Weber's Last Waltz", was actually composed by Carl Gottlieb Reissiger. A manuscript copy of the music was found among Weber's papers upon his death in 1826 and the work was mistakenly attributed to him.
- Usher's painting reminds the narrator of the Swiss-born British painter Henry Fuseli.

Usher's library is mentioned to have "formed no small portion of the mental existence of the invalid [Roderick Usher]". A list of titles is provided in the story, all of which are allusions to real-world works. Several notable examples include:

- The Belphegor of Machiavelli, a tale involving demonic possession.
- Emanuel Swedenborg's Heaven and Hell, a book about divine visions and the afterlife.
- Directorium Inquisitorum, a list of heretical forbidden works.
- "Civitas Solis", a short Utopian work about a theocratic society. The philosopher and poet Tommaso Campanella believed that the world has a spiritual nature.

== Literary significance and criticism ==
"The Fall of the House of Usher" first appeared in Burton's.

Along with "The Tell-Tale Heart", "The Black Cat", and "The Cask of Amontillado", "The Fall of the House of Usher" is considered among Poe's more famous works of prose. As G.R. Thomson writes in his introduction to Great Short Works of Edgar Allan Poe, "the tale has long been hailed as a masterpiece of Gothic horror; it is also a masterpiece of dramatic irony and structural symbolism".

"The Fall of the House of Usher" has been criticized for being too formulaic, particularly in how Poe followed patterns established in his own works like "Morella" and "Ligeia", using stock characters in stock scenes and stock situations. Repetitive themes like an unidentifiable disease, madness, and resurrection are also criticized. Washington Irving explained to Poe in a letter dated November 6, 1839: "You have been too anxious to present your pictures vividly to the eye, or too distrustful of your effect, and had laid on too much colouring. It is erring on the best side – the side of luxuriance".

John McAleer maintained that Herman Melville's idea for "objectifying Ahab's flawed character" in Moby-Dick came from the "evocative force" of Poe's "The Fall of the House of Usher". In both Ahab and the house of Usher, the appearance of fundamental soundness is visibly flawed – by Ahab's livid scar, and by the fissure in the masonry of Usher.

== In other media ==
=== In film and television ===
The Fall of the House of Usher (1928), directed by Jean Epstein.

The Fall of the House of Usher (1928), directed by James Sibley Watson and Melville Webber.

La Chute de la maison Usher is a 1928 silent French horror film directed by Jean Epstein starring Marguerite Gance, Jean Debucourt, and Charles Lamy.

A second silent film version, also released in 1928, was directed by James Sibley Watson and Melville Webber.

A devout fan of the works of Poe, American director Curtis Harrington tackled the story in his first and last films. Casting himself in dual roles as Roderick and Madeline Usher in both versions, Harrington shot his original 10-minute silent short on 8mm in 1942, and he shot a new 36 minute version simply titled Usher on 35mm in 2000 which he intended to utilize in a longer Poe anthology film that never came to fruition. Both versions were included on the 2013 DVD/Blu-ray release Curtis Harrington: The Short Film Collection.

The December 5, 1949, episode of Lights Out was an adaptation of The Fall of the House of Usher starring Helmut Dantine, Pamela Conroy, and Stephen Courtleigh.

In 1950, a British film version of The Fall of the House of Usher was produced starring Gwen Watford, Kay Tendeter and Irving Steen.

In 1956, NBC Matinee Theater on US television broadcast The Fall of the House of Usher starring Marshall Thompson and Tom Tryon for episode 197.

In the Roger Corman film from 1960, released in the United States as House of Usher, Vincent Price starred as Roderick Usher, Myrna Fahey as Madeline and Mark Damon as Philip Winthrop, Madeline's fiancé. The film was Corman's first in a series of eight films inspired by the works of Edgar Allan Poe.

A television adaptation was produced by ATV for the ITV network in 1966 for the horror anthology series Mystery and Imagination. Episode 3 in 1966 was The Fall of the House of Usher.

In 1976, a 30-minute version of The Fall of the House of Usher was made for Short Story Showcase for American TV.

In 1979, Italian state channel RAI loosely adapted the short story, together with other Poe's works, in the series I racconti fantastici di Edgar Allan Poe. It was directed by Daniele D'Anza, with Roderick Usher played by Philippe Leroy; music was composed by pop band Pooh.

Filmed in 1979 but not released until 1982, American television network NBC broadcast the story, directed by James L. Conway and starring Martin Landau, Robert Hays, Ray Walston and Charlene Tilton.

Czech director Jan Švankmajer adapted the story into the 1980 short film Zánik domu Usherů, which made use of black and white photography and stop-motion techniques but no actors on screen at any moment.

In 1989, The House of Usher was a film produced by American, British, and Canadian companies starring Oliver Reed.

In 2002, Ken Russell produced a horror comedy version titled The Fall of the Louse of Usher.

The 2006 film The House of Usher from Australian director Hayley Cloake, starring Austin Nichols as Roderick Usher, was an update of the tale set in the modern era with a love interest for Roderick in the form of the best friend of his deceased sister.

The Fall of the House of Usher (2015), narrated by Christopher Lee, is an animated short film which is part of Extraordinary Tales.

Intrepid Pictures created an eight-episode limited series titled The Fall of the House of Usher for Netflix that is based on the works of Edgar Allan Poe. Mike Flanagan and Michael Fimognari each directed four episodes and executive produced the series, which premiered in 2023.

=== In theater and music ===
From 1908 to 1917, French composer Claude Debussy worked on an opera titled La chute de la maison Usher.

The lyrics of Alan Hull's song "Lady Eleanor", a 1971 hit single for British folk rock band Lindisfarne, were inspired by "The Fall of the House of Usher" and other Poe works.

"The Fall of the House of Usher" is a five-part instrumental suite on the 1976 album Tales of Mystery and Imagination by The Alan Parsons Project.

The Fall of the House of Usher is another operatic version, composed by Philip Glass in 1987 with a libretto by Arthur Yorinks, premiered at the American Repertory Theatre and the Kentucky Opera in 1988 and was revived at the Nashville Opera in 2009. The Long Beach Opera mounted a version of this work in February 2013 at the Warner Grand Theatre in San Pedro, Los Angeles.

The Fall of the House of Usher is an opera composed by Peter Hammill with a libretto by Chris Judge Smith released in 1991 on Some Bizzare Records; in 1999, Hammill revised his work and released it as The Fall of the House of Usher (Deconstructed & Rebuilt). This opera has never been performed live.

In 2002 Lance Tait wrote a one-act play, The Fall of the House of Usher, based on Poe's tale. Laura Grace Pattillo wrote in The Edgar Allan Poe Review (2006), "[Tait's] play follows Poe's original story quite closely, using a female Chorus figure to help further the tale as the 'Friend' (as Tait names the narrator) alternates between monologue and conversation with Usher."

In 2008, a musical adaptation ("Usher") won the Best Musical award at the New York International Fringe Festival.

The 2014 musical Ghost Quartet, written by the eponymous quartet, adapts the story and other works.

=== In literature ===
The Martian Chronicles, a 1950 collection of stories by Ray Bradbury, contains a novella called "Usher II," a homage to Poe. Its main character, William Stendahl, builds a house based on the specifications from Poe's story to murder his enemies.

Usher's Passing, a 1984 novel by Robert R. McCammon, is a gothic fiction novel based on the "true" story of the Usher family. Poe makes an appearance in the flashback that starts the novel.

The 2022 novel What Moves the Dead by American writer T. Kingfisher is a retelling of "The Fall of the House of Usher".
