= Businessman (disambiguation) =

A businessman is a business professional.

Businessman or Business Man may also refer to:

- Strictly Business (1962 film), also known as Businessmen, a 1962 Soviet film
- Businessman (film), a 2012 film by Puri Jagannadh
  - Businessman (soundtrack), a soundtrack album from the film
- "Business Man", a 2009 song by Crookers
- "Business Man", a song by Dizzee Rascal from the 2017 album Raskit
- "Business Man", a song by Tom Cardy from the 2021 EP Artificial Intelligence

== See also ==
- The Business Man (disambiguation)
