= The Man That Was Used Up =

Short story

- Short story by Edgar Allan Poe
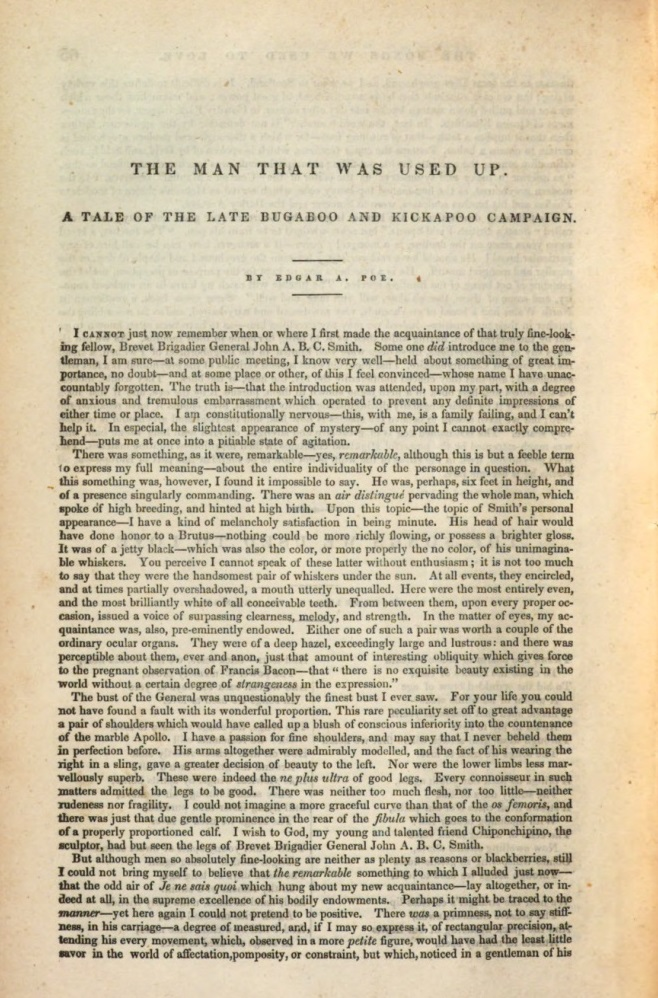

Text available at Wikisource
- Country: United States
- Language: English
- Genre: Satirical short story

Publication
- Published in: Burton's Gentleman's Magazine
- Media type: Print (Periodical)
- Publication date: August 1839

"The Man That Was Used Up: A Tale of the Late Bugaboo and Kickapoo Campaign", is a satirical short story by Edgar Allan Poe. It was first published in August 1839 in Burton's Gentleman's Magazine.

The story follows an unnamed narrator who meets famous war hero General John A. B. C. Smith and begins to suspect he has some deep secret behind his seemingly magnificent physical appearance. When others he asks only remark on the horrors of the Indian Wars and the wonders of their "age of invention," the narrator visits Smith at home, and finds he is but a heap of flesh whose body parts must be assembled piece by piece.

Scholars consider "The Man That Was Used Up" a satirical comment on America's brutal Indian Wars. They have looked for models for Smith, the most common being Winfield Scott, commander of the U.S. Army and a veteran of the Indian Wars among many other conflicts. Additionally, some scholars suggest that Poe is questioning the strong male identity as well as how humanity falls as machines become more advanced.

== Plot summary ==
An unnamed narrator meets the famous Brevet Brigadier General John A. B. C. Smith, "one of the most remarkable men of the age" and a hero of "the late tremendous swamp-fight, away down South, with the Bugaboo and Kickapoo Indians." Smith is an impressive physical specimen at six feet tall with flowing black hair, "large and lustrous" eyes, powerful-looking shoulders, and other essentially perfect attributes. He is also known for his great speaking ability, often boasting of his triumphs and about the advancements of the age.

The narrator wants to learn more about this heroic man. He finds that people do not seem to want to speak about the General when asked, only commenting on achievements of the "wonderfully inventive age" and how "horrid" the Native Americans whom the General had fought against had been. Whenever anyone seems on the verge of revealing some great secret about Smith, a distraction occurs to end or sidetrack the conversation. The narrator becomes increasingly determined to discover all he can and eventually decides to speak directly to Smith.

When he visits Smith's home, he finds an oddly shaped bundle on the floor that begins to speak. It is Smith himself, whose servant begins to "assemble" him as he converses with the narrator. Limbs and other body parts are attached one at a time, including a wig, a glass eye, and false teeth, until the man stands "whole" and ready to present himself in public. During his battles against the Native Americans, he was captured and severely mutilated; much of his body now consists of prostheses, which must be attached every morning and removed at night. The narrator now understands Smith's secret — he is "the man that was used up."

== Publication history ==
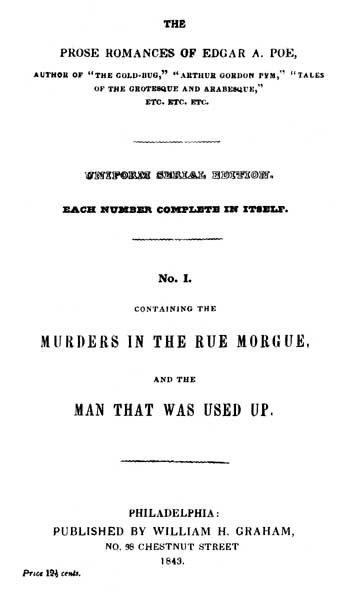
The Prose Romances of Edgar A. Poe, No. I, William H. Graham, Philadelphia, 1843.

"The Man That Was Used Up" was first published in Burton's Gentleman's Magazine in August 1839. Poe had joined the magazine in May, working as an editor and supplying poems, book reviews and articles starting with the June issue. It was his first piece of fiction for Burton's, and his twenty-first published magazine tale overall.

The tale was subsequently published in Poe's 1840 anthology Tales of the Grotesque and Arabesque. In 1843, Poe had the idea to print a series of pamphlets with his stories, though he ultimately printed only one: "The Man That Was Used Up" paired with "The Murders in the Rue Morgue". It sold for 12 and a half cents.

== Analysis ==
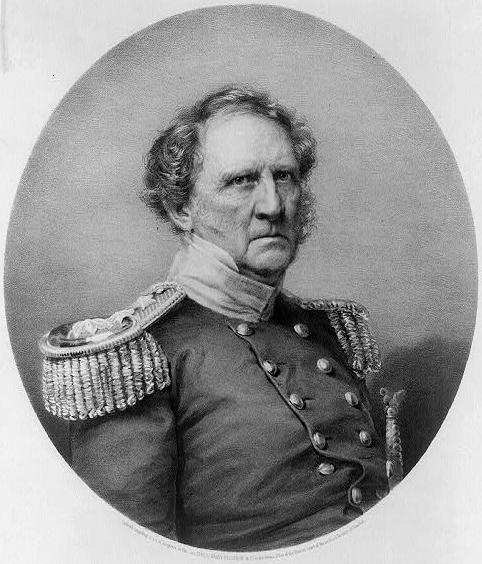
General Winfield Scott may have inspired "The Man That Was Used Up".

Critics have read "The Man That Was Used Up" in the context of the United States' bloody Indian removal campaigns, in particular the intractable Second Seminole War in Florida, which had been ongoing for four years when the story published. The Army's conventional battlefield approach had proven ineffective against the Seminoles' guerilla warfare tactics, and by the summer of 1839 many Americans of various political leanings saw the war as a shameful disaster. The war provided Poe an opportunity to satirize American hero-worship and militarized self-image. "The Man That Was Used Up" was a turning point for Poe; it was his first tale to take contemporary American culture as its subject after 20 stories that employed Old World settings and themes.

Critics have looked for real-world models for the character of General John A. B. C. Smith. Most commonly Smith is identified as a parody of General Winfield Scott, one of the longest-serving generals in American history who had commanded forces in the War of 1812 and went on to serve in the Mexican–American War and the American Civil War. Scott had been badly injured in the War of 1812 and participated in the Indian removal wars against the Seminoles and Muscogee; he had also served in the Black Hawk War in which a number of Kickapoo participated. Scott was a close relative of Louisa Patterson, the second wife of Poe's foster father John Allan, and he and Poe had met. At the time Poe wrote the tale in 1839, Scott was already considered a possible Whig candidate for the presidency; he went on to seek the nomination four times, receiving it in 1852 but losing the presidential election to Franklin Pierce.

Alternatively, it has been suggested that Poe may have been referring to Richard Mentor Johnson, Vice President of the United States under Martin Van Buren, who had fought Britain's Indian allies in the War of 1812 and bragged that he personally killed Tecumseh. J. Gerald Kennedy further suggests General Alexander Macomb, the Commanding General of the United States Army, as the model for General Smith. Contemporary accounts described Macomb as a dashing figure, but his performance in Florida was ineffectual and ruinous, which may have given Poe fodder for the superficially debonaire but secretly dismembered Smith.

According to scholar Leland S. Person, Poe is using the story as a critique of male military identity, which he knew well from his own military career and his studies at the United States Military Academy at West Point. It is a literal deconstruction of the identity of a military model of manhood according to postmodern narrative, that was given status after Indian removal campaigns of the 1830s. The story seems to suggest that the war hero has nothing left but the injuries he has received in battle to make up his identity. According to Shawn James Rosenheim, Poe also is questioning technology, suggesting that it will soon be difficult to distinguish man from machine. The story also has minor critiques of racism; the war hero was taken apart by Indians but is put together by his "old negro valet" named Pompey (a name Poe also uses in "A Predicament"), arguably undermining the power of white male dominance. Poe may also have been reacting to the popular "subversive" humor of the day, exaggerating the technique to the point of being inane.

The opening epigraph to the story is from Le Cid by Pierre Corneille and translates to:

"Weep, weep, my eyes and float yourself in tears!
The better half of my life has laid the other to rest."

The story bears a resemblance to "A Beautiful Young Nymph Going to Bed", a satiric poem by Jonathan Swift from 1731. Both works depict grotesquely artificial bodies: Swift's poem features a young woman preparing for bed by deconstructing, while Poe's story features an old man reconstructing himself to begin his day.

Some consider "The Man That Was Used Up" to be one of the earliest works of science fiction about cyborgs.
