= William Wilson (short story) =

Short story by Edgar Allan Poe

- Short story by Edgar Allan Poe
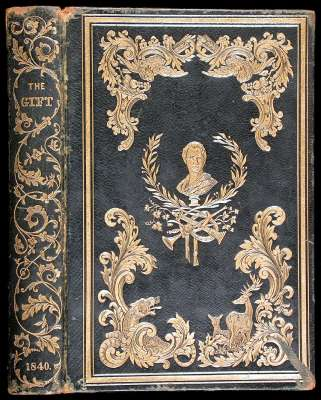
- The Gift, Carey and Hart, Philadelphia, 1840
- Country: United States
- Language: English

Publication
- Published in: Burton's Gentleman's Magazine
- Media type: Monthly magazine
- Publication date: October 1839

"William Wilson" is a short story by American writer Edgar Allan Poe, first published in 1839 in The Gift, with a setting inspired by Poe's formative years on the outskirts of London. The tale features a doppelgänger. It also appeared in the 1840 collection Tales of the Grotesque and Arabesque, and has been adapted several times.

== Plot summary ==
The story follows a man of "a noble descent" using the name "William Wilson", though the name is implied to be a pseudonym in the first sentence. Although denouncing his profligate past, he does not accept full blame for his actions and says that "man was never thus ... tempted before". The narration then segues into a description of Wilson's boyhood, spent in a school "in a misty-looking village of England".

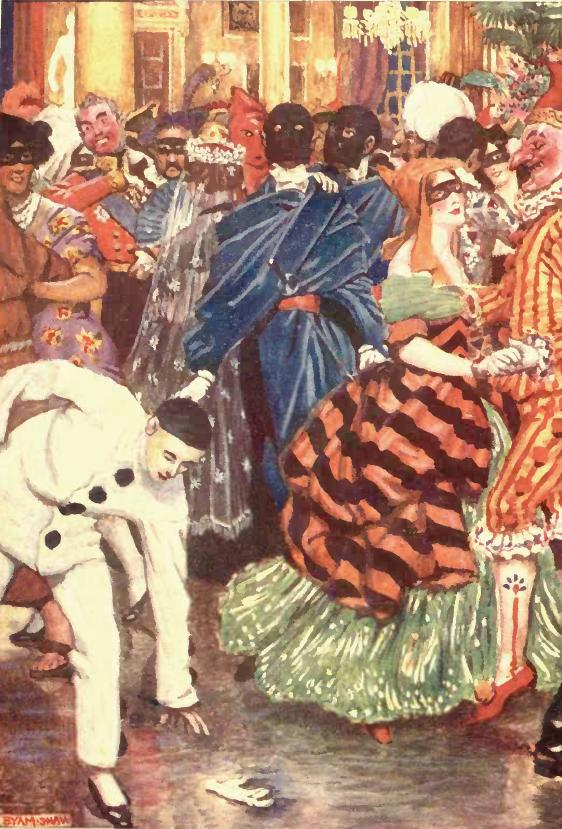
Wilson and his "double" at the carnival in an illustration by Byam Shaw for a London edition dated 1909

William meets another boy in school with the same name and roughly the same appearance, and is even born on the same date (January 19, Poe's birthday). William's name (he asserts that his actual name is only similar to "William Wilson") is embarrassing because it sounds "plebeian" or common, and it is irksome that he must hear the name twice as much on account of the other William.

The boy also dresses and walks like William, but can only speak in a whisper. He begins to give advice to William of an unspecified nature, which is not obeyed, as William resents the boy's "arrogance". One night, stealing into the other William's bedroom, recoils in horror at the boy's face—which now resembles his. William then immediately leaves the academy and, in the same week, the other boy follows suit.

William eventually attends Eton and the University of Oxford, gradually becoming more debauched and performing "mischief". For example, stealing from a man by cheating at cards. The other William appears with a covered face, and whispers a few words sufficient to alert others to William's behavior, and then leaves with no one seeing his face. William is haunted by the double in subsequent years, thwarting plans described by William as driven by ambition, anger and lust. In the latest caper, he attempts to seduce a married noblewoman at Carnival in Rome, but the other William stops him. The enraged protagonist drags the "unresisting" double—wearing identical clothes— into an antechamber, and, after a brief sword fight in which the double participates only reluctantly, stabs him fatally.

After William does this, a large mirror suddenly seems to appear. Reflected, he sees "mine own image, but with features all pale and dabbled in blood": apparently the dead double, "but he spoke no longer in a whisper". The narrator feels as if he is pronouncing the words: "In me didst thou exist—and in my death, see ... how utterly thou hast murdered thyself."

== Background ==
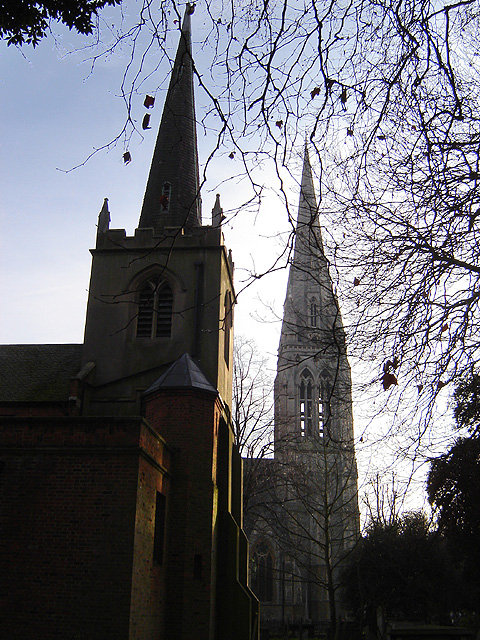
Stoke Newington retains two parish churches: St Mary's Old Church (left) and New Church (right)

The setting of "William Wilson" is semi-autobiographical and relates to Poe's residence in England as a boy. The "misty-looking village of England" of the story is Stoke Newington, now a suburb of north London. The school is based on the Manor House School which Poe attended from 1817 to 1820. Poe's headmaster there, the Reverend John Bransby, shares the same name as the headmaster in the story, though, in the latter, he acquires the dignity of being a "Doctor". This school has since been demolished. The church mentioned in the story is based on St Mary's "Old" Church, the original parish church of Stoke Newington. This building is still extant. In Poe's story the church is described to have a Gothic spire. The spire, however, was only added to the church in 1829, some nine years after Poe had left the school.

Additionally, Poe acknowledged that the idea of a story about the irritation one feels by meeting someone with the same name, thereby ruining a feeling of uniqueness, was inspired by Washington Irving's "An Unwritten Drama of Lord Byron". At the end of Irving's tale, the main character kills his double with his sword, only to see his own face behind the mask.

== Analysis ==
"William Wilson" clearly explores the theme of the double. This second self haunts the protagonist and leads him to insanity and also represents his own insanity. According to Poe biographer Arthur Hobson Quinn, the second self represents the conscience. This division of the self is reinforced by the narrator's admission that "William Wilson" is actually a pseudonym. The name itself is an interesting choice: "son" of "will". In other words, William Wilson has willed himself into being along with the double which shares that name.

Poe wrote the story very carefully and with subtlety. Sentences are balanced, with very few adjectives, and there is little concrete imagery beyond the description of Wilson's school. Pacing is purposely set as leisurely and measured using a formal style and longer sentences. Rather than creating a poetic effect or mood, as Poe recommends in "The Philosophy of Composition", Poe is creating a tale based on rationality and logic.

== Publication history ==
"William Wilson" was first published in 1839 in the anthology The Gift: A Christmas and New Year's Present (dated for 1840) edited by Eliza Leslie. Then the story appeared in the October 1839 issue of Burton's Gentleman's Magazine. The text in Burton's was accompanied by a note that said this piece of Poe's was "From The Gift of 1840". The story was reprinted in Cincinnati, Ohio, in The Daily Buckeye on October 26-30, 1839. It was also reprinted in 1845 in New York City, in both the Broadway Journal on August 30, and in The Spirit of the Times on September 5–8.

The tale was translated into French in December 1844, and printed in the Paris newspaper La Quotidienne in two installments. This was the first translation of Poe's work into a language other than English and the piece introduced Poe to France.

== Critical reception ==
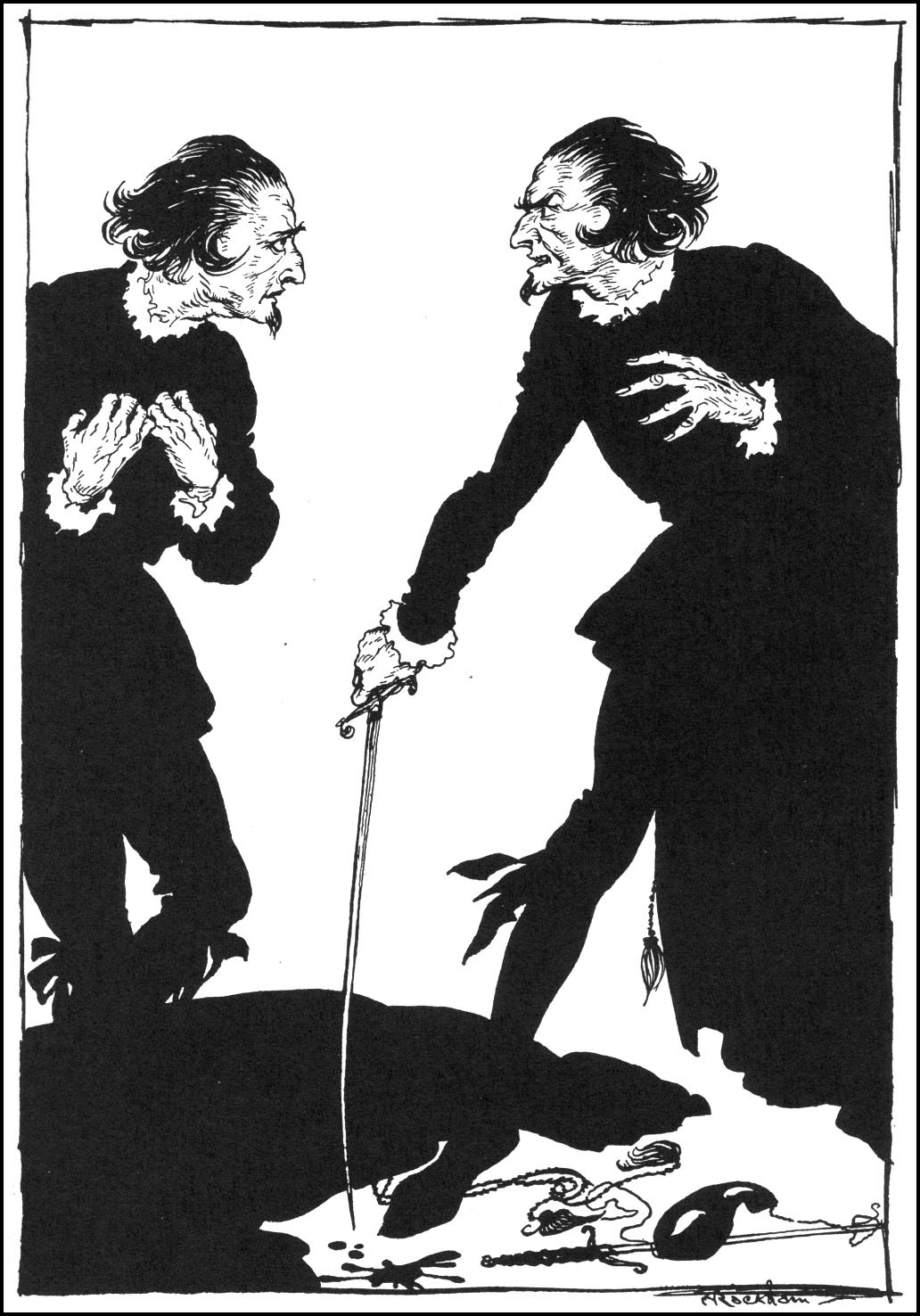
Wilson confronts his "double" in an illustration by Arthur Rackham, 1935

When Poe wrote to Washington Irving asking for a word of endorsement, he specifically requested a response to "William Wilson", calling it "my best effort". Irving responded, "It is managed in a highly picturesque Style and the Singular and Mysterious interest is well sustained throughout". Thomas Mann said of Fyodor Dostoevsky's The Double: A Petersburg Poem, which explores a similar doppelgänger theme, "by no means improved on Edgar Allan Poe's 'William Wilson,' a tale that deals with the same old romantic motif in a way far more profound on the moral side and more successfully resolving the critical [theme] in the poetic".

In Poe's review of Nathaniel Hawthorne's Twice-Told Tales, Poe noted that the short story "Howe's Masquerade" was similar to "William Wilson". As he wrote, "not only are the two general conceptions identical but there are various points of similarity".

== Adaptations ==
In 1913, "William Wilson" was freely adapted into The Student of Prague, a German film directed by Stellan Rye and Paul Wegener and starring Wegener. A 1926 version was also made in Germany and directed by Henrik Galeen and starred Conrad Veidt. A third German adaptation, made in 1935, was directed by Arthur Robison and starred Anton Walbrook.

In 1943, "William Wilson" was adapted as a radio play for The Weird Circle on the Mutual Broadcasting System.

A French-Italian collaboration was released in 1968 called Spirits of the Dead or Histoires extraordinaires. The film is composed of three vignettes, directed by Roger Vadim, Louis Malle and Federico Fellini and starring Alain Delon and Brigitte Bardot. The other two segments adapt Poe's "Metzengerstein" and "Never Bet the Devil Your Head". It would also form the basis for The Smithereens' song of the same name, from their 1989 album 11.

In 1968, Editora Taika in Brazil published a comic adaptation in Album Clássicos de Terror #6. Art was by Osvaldo Talo. It was reprinted in Clássicos de Terror (2nd series) #5 in June 1973.

In 1974, Skywald published a comic adaptation in Nightmare #19 (June 1974), adapted by Al Hewetson, with art by Alfonso Font. This was reprinted by Mehmet K. Benli Turkey in Vampirella #3 (October 25, 1976) and Vampirella # (1977); and by Eternity Comics in Edgar Allan Poe: The Tell-Tale Heart and Other Stories #1 (June 1988).

In 1976 the BBC anthology series Centre Play aired an adaptation written by Hugh Whitemore featuring Norman Eshley as the title character along with Stephen Murray, Anthony Daniels, and Robert Tayman.

In 1976, British filmmaker Peter de Rome made a loose adaptation of the story with his second and final feature, The Destroying Angel, a hybrid of horror movie and gay porn film, produced by New York studio Hand in Hand Films. The film is about a man on sabbatical from seminary who experiences inner conflict between his sexual desires and his call to the cloth, which is made manifest through the appearances of his doppelgänger. The stabbing scene in Poe's story is the one moment that is directly paralleled in the film. Peter de Rome said he was inspired to make this film when he saw a portrait of Poe and realized that Poe was, essentially, visually his own doppelganger.

In 1979, Ediciones de la Urraca in Argentina published a comic adaptation in El Péndulo #2 (October 1979). Adaptation was by Guillermo Saccomanno, art was by Alberto Breccia. This was reprinted by Les Humanoïdes Associés in France in Le Cœur révélateur (1992 and September 1995) and by Doedyeeditores in Argentina in El gato negro y otras historias (2011).

In 1979, Bloch Editores S.A. in Brazil published a comic adaptation in Aventuras Macabras #12 (1979). The adaptation and art were by José Menezes.

In 1999, Spanish director Jorge Dayas released a 35 mm animated short film, awarded in Animadrid 2000 and Málaga Film Festival.

== References in other works ==
There are strains of the story of "William Wilson" in Andrew Taylor's "The American Boy", in which Edgar Allan Poe himself is featured as a character.

Nabokov's Lolita has been cited as at least a parody of the story.

In Jean-Luc Godard's 1963 film Pierrot Le Fou, the main character, Ferdinand, summarizes the story as an example of things that he and the other protagonist, Marianne, could perform to earn money.

Paul Auster's novel The New York Trilogy features a character named Quinn who writes under the pseudonym "William Wilson". The novel uses intertextuality to explore the nature of identity and reality.

In Stephen King's novel The Outsider, the detective character Anderson draws a parallel between the case he investigates and Poe's story "William Wilson". Stephen King also told the media that the novel is partly inspired by this story. King also refers to "William Wilson" in his 1980 novel Firestarter, in which a man subjected to mind control begins dangerously obsessing over the Poe story.
