= Blackwood's Magazine =

British magazine (1817–1980)

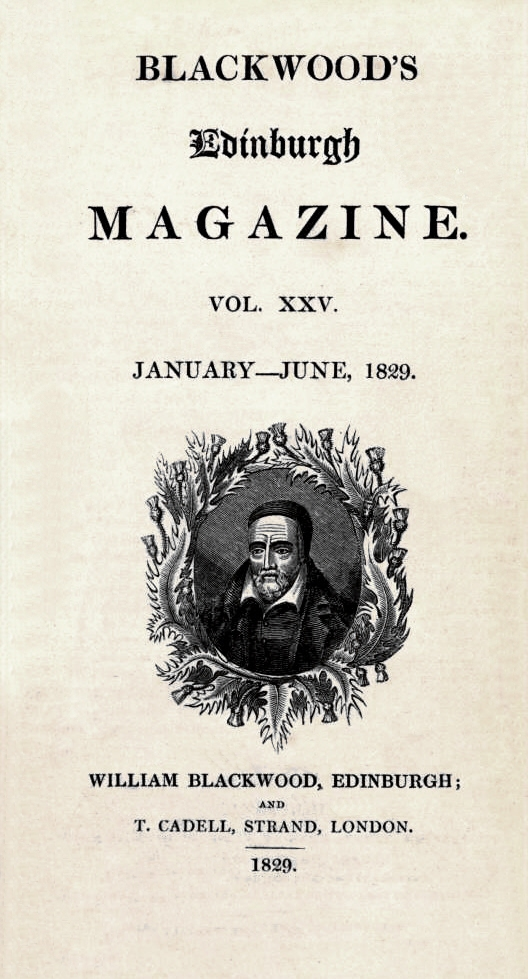
- Title page to volume XXV, January–June 1829
- Categories: Miscellany
- Frequency: Monthly
- Founder: William Blackwood
- Founded: 1817
- Final issue: 1980
- Company: Blackwood
- Country: United Kingdom
- Based in: Edinburgh, Scotland
- Language: English
- ISSN: 0006-436X

Blackwood's Magazine was a British magazine and miscellany printed between 1817 and 1980. It was founded by publisher William Blackwood and originally called the Edinburgh Monthly Magazine, but quickly relaunched as Blackwood's Edinburgh Magazine. Nicknamed Maga, it was affiliated with Tory politics and a controversial tone described by scholars as "brilliant, troubling, acerbic"; "bold and forceful"; "riotous ... blackguardly"; and full of "puffery, and scurrilous critique". Having published a host of significant authors, literature scholar William B. Cairns judged it the best British literary journal between 1815 and 1833. In 1838, it was the inspiration for the short story "How to Write a Blackwood Article" by Edgar Allan Poe. The magazine went into decline in the aftermath of World War II and saw its final issue in December 1980.

== History ==
Publisher William Blackwood of Edinburgh launched Blackwood's in 1817 as a Tory literary journal to rival the Whig-supporting Edinburgh Review. Nicknamed Maga, it was more conservative and controversial than the Quarterly Review of London. The first issue was April 1817, edited by Thomas Pringle and James Gleghorn. In September, Blackwood took over editorship and hired John Gibson Lockhart and William Maginn to serve as assistant editors. For all its conservative credentials the magazine published the works of radicals of British romanticism such as Percy Bysshe Shelley and Samuel Taylor Coleridge, as well as early feminist essays by American John Neal. Through John Wilson the magazine was a keen supporter of William Wordsworth, parodied the Byronmania common in Europe and angered John Keats, Leigh Hunt and William Hazlitt by referring to their works as the "Cockney School of Poetry". The controversial style of the magazine got it into trouble when, in 1821, John Scott, the editor of the London Magazine, fought a duel with Jonathan Henry Christie over libellous statements in the magazine. Scott was shot and killed.

In 1824, Blackwood's became the first British literary journal to publish work by an American with an essay by John Neal that got reprinted across Europe. Over the following year and a half the magazine published Neal's American Writers series, which is the first written history of American literature. Blackwood's relationship with Neal eroded after publishing Neal's novel Brother Jonathan at a great financial loss in 1825. Around this time, the magazine began publishing horror fiction to increase its audience.

Literature scholar William B. Cairns considered Blackwood's the most important British literary periodical between 1815 and 1833, noting especially the influence of Neal's contributions. The editors of a six-volume 2016 academic collection of Blackwood's articles called it "the most brilliant, troubling, acerbic and imaginative periodical of the post-Napoleonic age". Literature scholar Fritz Fleischmann described the magazine as subscribing to an "aesthetic belief in original thoughts expressed in bold and forceful language". The editor of a 1959 academic Blackwood's collection used the words "riotous" and "blackguardly". Literature scholar Jonathan Elmer described it as "a journal that took pleasure in self-conscious play with pseudonym, puffery, and scurrilous critique." Despite publishing Neal, Maga became famous for attacking American culture.

Important contributors included: George Eliot, Joseph Conrad, John Buchan, George Tomkyns Chesney, Samuel Taylor Coleridge, Felicia Hemans, James Hogg, Charles Neaves, Thomas de Quincey, Elizabeth Clementine Stedman, William Mudford, Margaret Oliphant, Hugh Clifford, Mary Margaret Busk and Frank Swettenham. Robert Macnish contributed under the epithet, Modern Pythagorean. It was an open secret that Charles Whibley contributed anonymously his Musings without Methods to the Magazine for over twenty-five years. T. S. Eliot described them as "the best sustained piece of literary journalism that I know of in recent times".

World War II is considered Maga's turning point. The magazine was subject to paper rationing, the allotment being based on the company's worst year, 1939. After the war, Blackwood's competed poorly with new magazines and suffered from reduced interest in literary magazines. By the early 1970s, the magazine gained a reputation for being dated and was largely rejected by younger authors and readers. Subscriptions declined over that decade.

Editorship remained exclusively in the hands of Blackwood family members through Douglas Blackwood, great-great-grandson of William Blackwood, who served in that role from 1948 through 1976. Douglas Blackwood handed over the business to his son Mike Blackwood, who remained as Managing Director through the final issue in December 1980.

== Cultural references ==
Edgar Allan Poe published a short story entitled "How to Write a Blackwood Article" in November 1838 as a companion piece to "A Predicament". The story satirizes Blackwood's by ironically employing the magazine's famously controversial tone.

== See also ==
- Tait's Edinburgh Magazine
- The Young Men's Magazine
