= Bon-Bon (short story) =

- Short story by Edgar Allan Poe
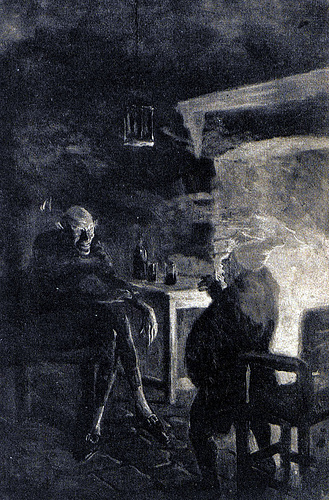
- Early 20th-century illustration by T. S. Coburn
- Original title: The Bargain Lost
- Country: United States
- Language: English
- Genres: Satirical; Short story

Publication
- Publisher: Philadelphia Saturday Courier
- Media type: Print (periodical)
- Publication date: December 1, 1831

"Bon-Bon" is a comedic short story by Edgar Allan Poe, first published in December 1832 in the Philadelphia Saturday Courier. Originally called "The Bargain Lost", it follows Pierre Bon-Bon, who believes himself a profound philosopher, and his encounter with the Devil. The story's humor is based on the verbal interchange between the two, which satirizes classical philosophers such as Plato and Aristotle. The Devil reveals that he has eaten the souls of many of these philosophers.

The story, which received moderate praise, was originally submitted by Poe as "The Bargain Lost", and was his entry to a writing contest. Though none of the five stories he submitted won the prize, the Courier printed them all, possibly without paying Poe for them. This early version of the story has many differences from later versions, which Poe first published as "Bon-Bon" in 1835.

== Plot summary ==
Pierre Bon-Bon is a well-known French restaurant owner and chef, known both for his omelettes and his metaphysical philosophies. The narrator describes him as profound and a man of genius, as even the man's cat knew. Bon-Bon, who has "an inclination for the bottle", is drinking around midnight on a snowy winter night when he hears a voice. He recognizes it as that of the Devil himself, who then appears in a black suit in the style of the previous century, and which is a bit too small for him. He wears green spectacles, and has a stylus behind one ear and a large black book in his breast pocket.

The two engage in conversation, Bon-Bon pressing the Devil for a philosophical exchange. He hopes to "elicit some important ethical ideas" that he can publish to make himself famous. Bon-Bon learns that the Devil has never had eyes, but is convinced his vision is better and "more penetrating" than Bon-Bon's. The Devil can see the thoughts of others and, as he puts it, "my vision is the soul".

The two share several bottles of wine until Bon-Bon cannot speak without hiccuping. The Devil, who explains that he eats souls, gives a long list of famous philosophers he has eaten, and his assessments of how each of them tasted. Bon-Bon suggests that his own soul is qualified for a stew or soufflé and offers it to his visitor at a bargain. The Devil refuses after Bon-Bon slaps him upon the back, saying that he cannot take advantage of the man's "disgusting and ungentlemanly" drunken state. As the Devil leaves, Bon-Bon tries to throw a bottle at him, but the iron lamp hanging above him comes loose and hits him on the head, prostrating him.

== Publication history ==
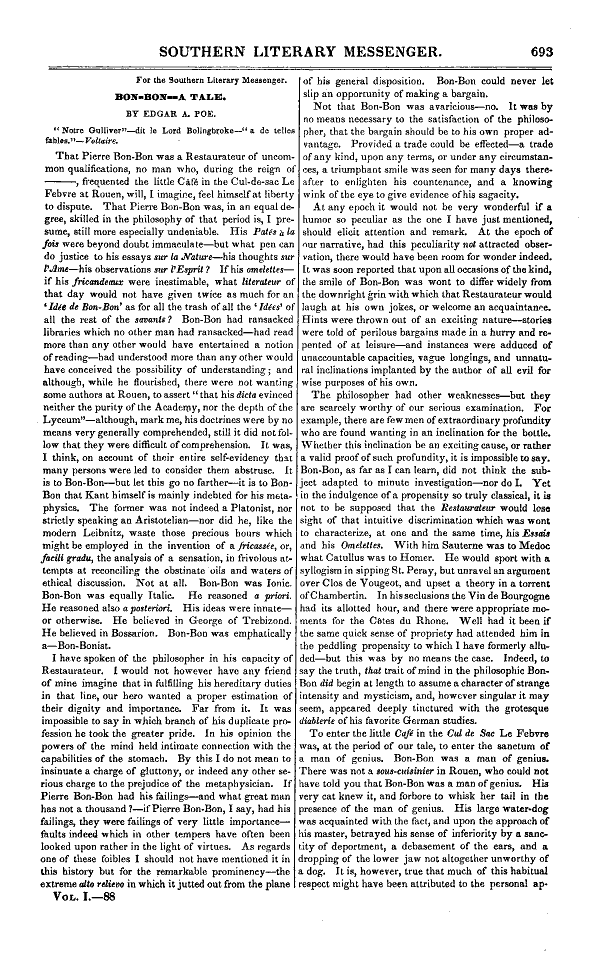
First publication under the title "Bon-Bon—A Tale", Southern Literary Messenger, August 1835

Poe submitted "Bon-Bon" to the Philadelphia Saturday Courier under the title "The Bargain Lost" as an entry to a writing contest. Poe also submitted four other tales: "Metzengerstein", "The Duke de L'Omelette", "A Tale of Jerusalem", and "A Decided Loss". Though none of his entries won the $100 prize, the editors of the Courier were impressed enough that they published all of Poe's stories over the next few months.

"The Bargain Lost" was published on December 1, 1831. It is unclear if Poe was paid for its publication. There were several differences between this version and later versions: originally, the main character was named Pedro Garcia, his encounter was not with the Devil himself but with one of his messengers, and the story took place in Venice rather than France. The original text included the line "It was a dark and stormy night" as a tribute to Edward Bulwer-Lytton. The line was removed in later editions.

Poe retitled the story "Bon-Bon—A Tale" when it was republished in the Southern Literary Messenger in August 1835. It was later published in Tales of the Grotesque and Arabesque in 1845.

The original epigraph preceding the story was from William Shakespeare's As You Like It: "The heathen philosopher, when he had a mind to eat a grape, would open his lips when he put it into his mouth, meaning thereby that grapes were made to eat and lips to open". Poe's final version of the story had a longer epigraph in verse from Les Premiers Traits de l'erudition universelle (The Most Important Characteristics of Universal Wisdom) by Baron Bielfeld.

== Critical response ==
An editorial in the Philadelphia Saturday Courier thanked Poe for submitting the stories. The writer, presumably the editor, Lambert A. Wilmer, added that "we have read these tales, every syllable, with the greatest pleasure, and for originality, richness of imagery and purity of the style, few American authors in our opinion have produced any thing superior". A reviewer in the Winchester Republication wrote "Mr. Poe's 'Bon-Bon' is quite a unique and racy affair". William Gwynn, editor of the Baltimore Gazette, wrote that the story "sustains the well established reputation of the author as a writer possessing a rich imaginative genius, and a free, flowing and very happy style".

== Themes and analysis ==
Like many of Poe's early tales, "Bon-Bon" was, as Poe wrote, "intended for half banter, half satire" and explores attempts at surviving death. Poe pokes fun at the pretentiousness of scholars by having his character make references to classic Greek and Latin authors, only to hear that their souls have been eaten. The comedy in the story is verbal, based on turns of phrase, funny euphemisms, and absurd names.

The phrase "Bonbon" stems from the French word bon, "good", and is often used to describe sweet eatables. Poe also draws on the ancient Greek tradition of the soul as pneuma, an internal flame that converts food into a substance that passes into the blood. As the narrator of "Bon-Bon" says, "I am not sure, indeed, that Bon-Bon greatly disagreed with the Chinese, who held that the soul lies in the abdomen. The Greeks at all events were right, he thought, who employed the same words for the mind and the diaphragm."

Among the Devil's victims are Plato, Aristophanes, Catullus, Hippocrates, Quintilian and François Marie Arouet (the real name of Voltaire). As Bon-Bon offers his own soul, the Devil sneezes, referring to an earlier moment in the story when the Devil says that men dispel bad ideas by sneezing.

== Adaptations ==
"Bon-Bon" has not been adapted for the screen, but a rewritten version was performed off Broadway in 1920.
