= The Conversation of Eiros and Charmion =

1839 short story by Edgar Allan Poe

- Short story by Edgar Allan Poe
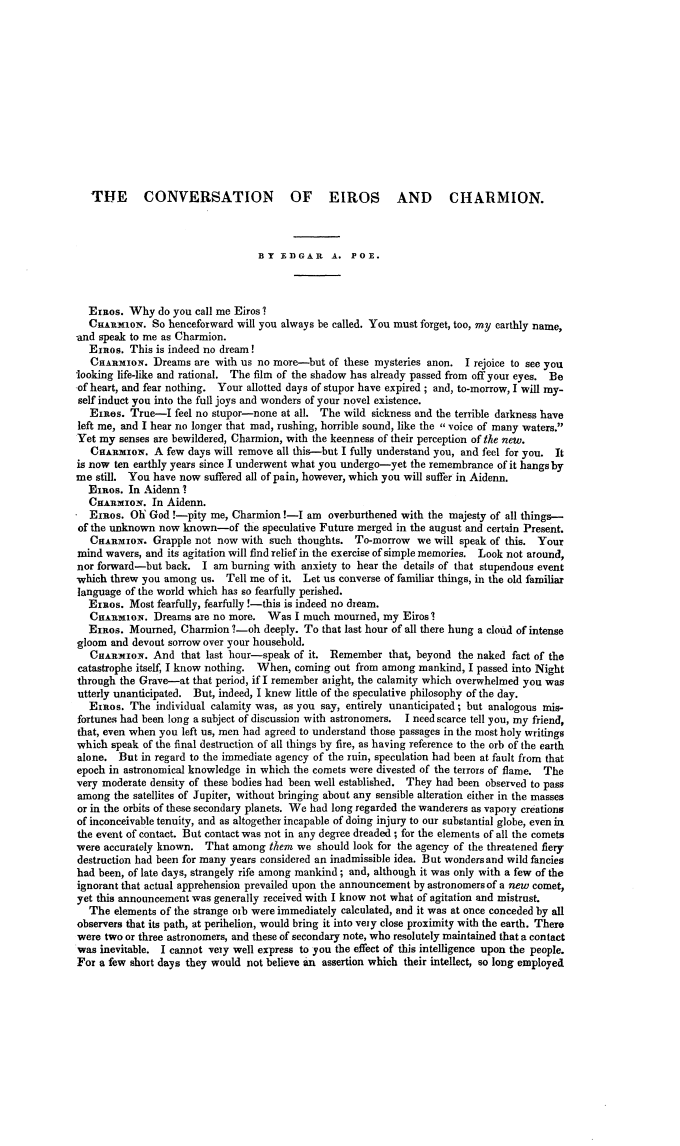
- Country: United States
- Language: English
- Genre: Science fiction

Publication
- Published in: Burton's Gentleman's Magazine
- Media type: Print (periodical)
- Publication date: December 1839

"The Conversation of Eiros and Charmion" is a short story by Edgar Allan Poe, an apocalyptic science fiction story first published in Burton's Gentleman's Magazine in December 1839.

== Plot summary ==
Two people, who have been renamed Eiros and Charmion after death, discuss the manner in which the world ended. Eiros, who died in the apocalypse, explains the circumstances to Charmion, who died ten years previously:

A new comet is detected in the Solar System; comets are well understood by astronomers, who believe that, being very tenuous, they could have no effect on the Earth, and are not related to ancient prophecies of the destruction of the world. Astronomers calculate that the comet is approaching the Earth; as it does so, they study it, and people increasingly take an interest.

When it is almost upon Earth, people experience exhilaration, which is at first assumed to be relief that the comet has no harmful effects; but this is followed by pain and delirium; it is as though the ancient prophecies, once dismissed by astronomers, have been confirmed. This effect on people's behavior is discovered to be caused by the loss of nitrogen from the atmosphere, leaving pure oxygen, which finally bursts into flame when the comet nucleus hits.

== Publication history ==
"The Conversation of Eiros and Charmion" was first published in the December 1839 issue of Burton's Gentleman's Magazine and was included that same month in the collection Tales of the Grotesque and Arabesque.

== Analysis ==
Poe, writing this story in 1839, was capitalizing on the excitement in the 1830s caused by William Miller's predictions of the end of the world. Miller predicted in 1831 that the world would end in 1843.

In the early 19th century, several comets were seen; in particular, Halley's Comet returned in 1835, and there was interest in Encke's Comet, whose periodicity had recently been calculated; it appeared in 1838, and its return was expected in 1842. All this aroused people's interest; comets were traditionally associated with prophecies of the end of the world.

Donald Olson and Shaun B. Ford at Texas State University speculate that Lexell's Comet and Biela's Comet inspired the story. Biela's Comet was reputed to have caused a "comet panic" in 1832, after a miscalculation of the comet's trajectory suggested collision with Earth. Astronomers in Paris, like the astronomers in the story, sought to allay the public's fear by noting that Biela's Comet was believed to have no mass. In the story, a vaporous comet strikes the Earth, depleting the atmosphere of nitrogen. Olson and Ford also suggest possible sources of Poe's knowledge of both comets: Elijah Hinsdale Burritt's The Geography of the Heavens and John Herschel's 1835 A Treatise on Astronomy. Another astronomy book for young people, James Ferguson's 1819 edition of An Easy Introduction to Astronomy for Young Gentlemen and Ladies, might have been available to a young Poe. Poe's foster father John Allan provided Poe with a telescope when Poe was a teenager, and the researchers speculate Ferguson's book may have also been a gift. The book includes a passage of dialogue between a brother and sister (Neander and Eudosia) discussing the possibility of a comet setting the world on fire and then dismissing that possibility because of the tenuous nature of comets.

Eiros and Charmion are named after Cleopatra's attendants, Iras and Charmion (or Charmian); they are mentioned by the Greek historian Plutarch in his biography of Mark Antony (in his work Parallel Lives); they appear in William Shakespeare's play Antony and Cleopatra, and John Dryden's play about Antony and Cleopatra, All for Love.

== See also ==
- Comets in fiction
