= Burton's Gentleman's Magazine =

Literary publication in Philadelphia, 1837–1840

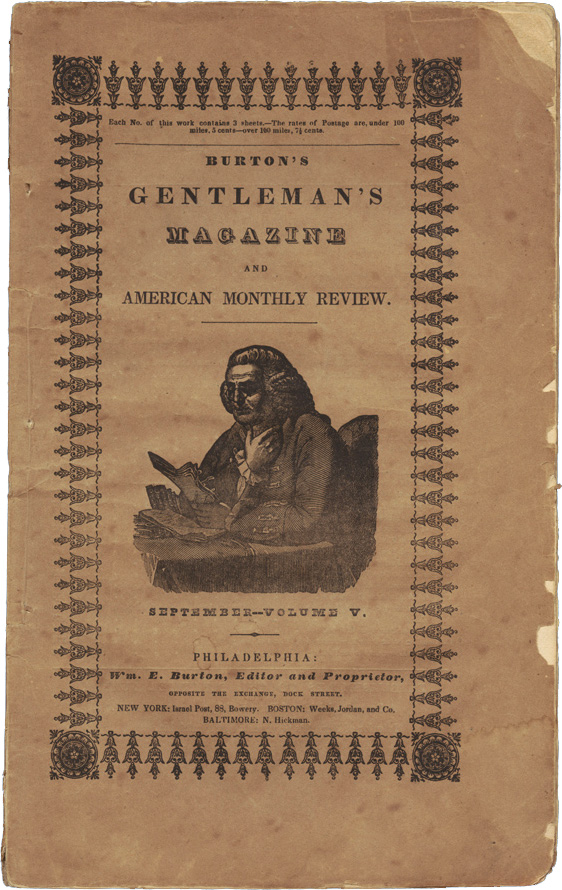
September 1839 issue of Burton's Gentleman's Magazine, which included the first publication of "The Fall of the House of Usher"

Burton's Gentleman's Magazine and American Monthly Review (sometimes ...and Monthly American Review or, more simply, Burton's Magazine) was a literary publication published in Philadelphia from 1837 to 1840. Its founder was William Evans Burton, an English-born immigrant to the United States who also managed a theatre and was a minor actor. Edgar Allan Poe was an editor and contributor in 1839–40.

== Overview ==
William Evans Burton teamed with publisher Charles Alexander to produce a magazine inspired by the successful The Gentleman's Magazine in London. To offset the financial adversity amidst the Panic of 1837, they focused on local authors and nationalist themes, signaled in part by a frontispiece with both patriotic and gentlemanly imagery as well as an illustration of Benjamin Franklin. Burton hoped to create a magazine that would be "worthy of a place upon every parlour table of every gentleman in the United States". The magazine included poems, fiction, and essays, with an emphasis on sporting life. Articles featured sailing, cricket, hunting, and more. To compete with other magazines of the time, Burton's included extra illustrations and thicker paper than standard.

They released their first issue in July 1837 and Burton bought out his partner to become the sole owner in December 1838.

=== Edgar Allan Poe ===
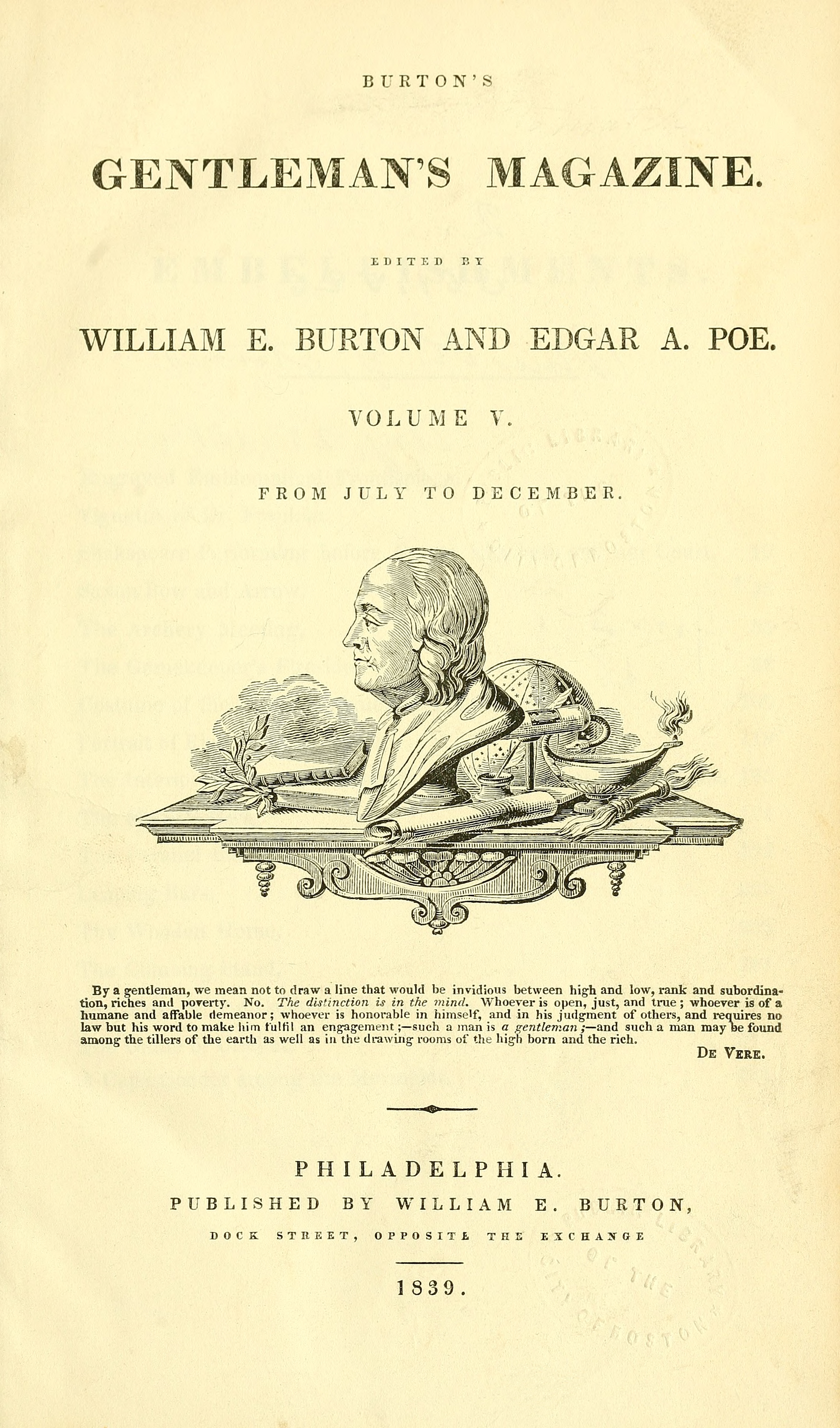
Frontispiece for Volume 5 (July–December 1839) of Burton's Gentlemen's Magazine, listing both Burton and Poe as editors

The magazine's most famous contributor and one-time editor was Edgar Allan Poe. Poe approached Burton to offer his services in May 1839. The June issue of that year included the notice that its owner had "made arrangements with Edgar A. Poe, Esq., late Editor of the Southern Literary Messenger, to devote his abilities and experience to a portion of the Editorial duties of the Gentlemen's Magazine". Poe agreed to provide about 11 pages of original material per month and his name was added next to Burton's. His role included editing articles and proofreading as well as original contributions like critical reviews. Burton offered Poe $10 a week for his services and estimated he would need to dedicate only two hours a day. In Burton's, Poe published now several of his own original tales including "The Man That Was Used Up" (August 1839), "The Fall of the House of Usher" (September 1839), "William Wilson" (October 1839), "Morella" (November 1839), "The Conversation of Eiros and Charmion" (December 1839) and "The Business Man" (February 1840). Disagreements between the two caused Burton to fire Poe in June 1840.

=== Merger ===
Burton lost interest in publishing and wanted to return to his drama background. To raise money for a new theater, he sold the magazine with its list of 3,500 subscribers for $3,500 to George Rex Graham. It was then merged with Atkinison's Casket to become Graham's Magazine, which began publication with the December 1840 issue. Burton urged Graham to "take care of my young editor" by rehiring Poe.

== See also ==
Other American journals that Edgar Allan Poe was involved with include the following:

- American Review: A Whig Journal
- Broadway Journal
- Godey's Lady's Book
- Graham's Magazine
- Southern Literary Messenger
- The Stylus
