= A Predicament =

Short story by Edgar Allan Poe

- Short story by Edgar Allan Poe
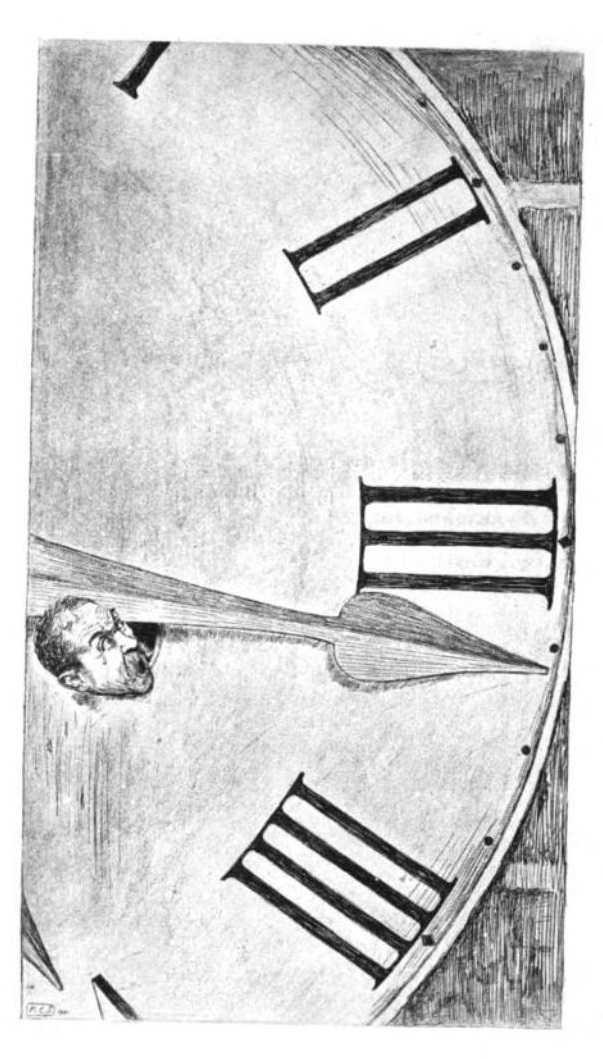
- 1894 illustration

Text available at Wikisource
- Original title: The Scythe of Time
- Language: English
- Genre: Humor/Satire

Publication
- Media type: short story

"A Predicament" is a humorous short story by Edgar Allan Poe, usually combined with its companion piece "How to Write a Blackwood Article". It was originally titled "The Scythe of Time". The paired stories parody the Gothic sensation tale, popular in England and America since the early 19th century.

== Plot summary ==
The story follows a narrator, Signora Psyche Zenobia. While walking through "the goodly city of Edina" with her 5-inch-tall (130 mm) poodle and her 3-foot-tall (0.91 m) black servant, Pompey, she is drawn to a large Gothic cathedral. At the steeple, Zenobia sees a small opening she wishes to look through. Standing on Pompey's shoulders, she pushes her head through the opening, realizing she is in the face of a giant clock. As she gazes out at the city beyond, she soon finds that the sharp minute hand has begun to dig into her neck. Slowly, the minute hand decapitates her. At one point, pressure against her neck causes her eye to fall and roll down into the gutter and then to the street below. Her other eye follows thereafter. Finally, the clock has fully severed her head from her body. She does not express despair and is, in fact, glad to be rid of it. For a moment, she wonders which is the real Zenobia: her headless body or her severed head. The head then gives a heroic speech which Zenobia's body cannot hear because it has no ears. Her narration continues without her head, as she is now able to step down from her predicament. In fear Pompey runs off, and Zenobia sees that a rat has eaten her poodle.

== "How to Write a Blackwood Article" ==
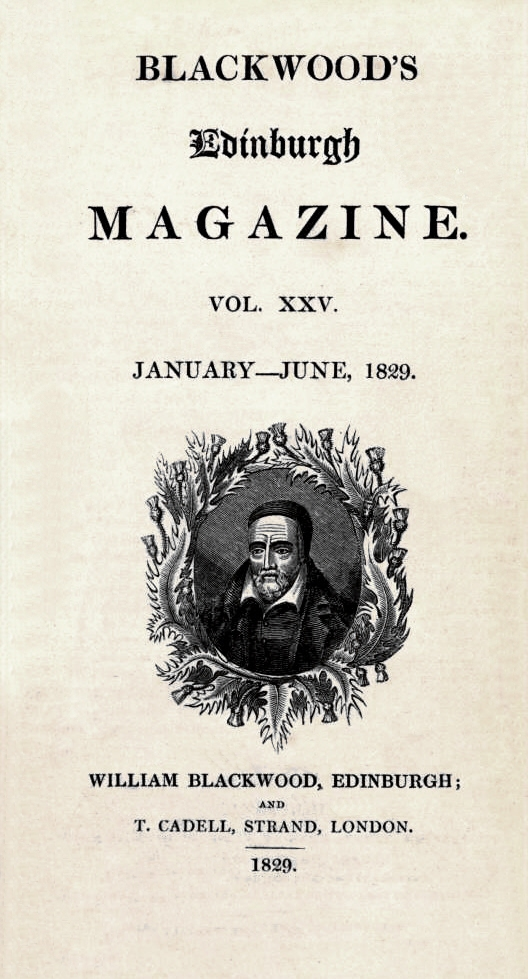
Blackwood's Magazine

The companion piece, "How to Write a Blackwood Article", is also narrated by Psyche Zenobia in the first person. It serves as a satirical "how-to" fiction on formulaic horror stories typically printed in the Scottish Blackwood's Magazine. The term "article", in Poe's time, also commonly referred to short stories rather than just non-fiction. In this mock essay, Poe stresses the need for elevating sensations in writing. The sensations should build up, it says, until the final moment, usually involving a brush with death. The editor in the story tells Zenobia to kill herself and record the sensations.

== Publication history ==
Originally pairing them together as "The Psyche Zenobia" and "The Scythe of Time", Poe first published these pieces in the American Museum based in Baltimore, Maryland in November 1838. The stories were retitled when they were republished in Tales of the Grotesque and Arabesque in 1840.

== Analysis ==
"A Predicament" and its companion piece "How to Write a Blackwood Article" feature the only narrator who is unquestionably a woman in the works of Poe. It is unclear how much of this story is meant to be sarcastic. The humor, however, is based on schadenfreude. In satirizing the tropes of these types of stories, Poe also burlesques many of the literary devices he would use in his own tales, including a character in a desperate situation and the use of French or German expressions. Like many of Poe's humor works, the comedy comes from the degree of excess as he depicts reality as a grotesque or cosmic hoax, with further humor watching characters come to terms with that world in a mock-serious way.

Poe may have intended the editor's suggestion that Zenobia kill herself as a jab at women writers or their editors. Additionally, Poe mocks political writing and plagiarism of the period by depicting the editor with three apprentices who use tailor shears to cut apart other articles and splice them together.

The Pompey character is one of only two African American characters who get extensive treatment in Poe's short stories, the other being Jupiter in "The Gold-Bug". Both are depicted with common racial stereotypes of the period.

== Adaptations ==
"A Predicament" was adapted in 2000 for National Public Radio by the Radio Tales series, under the name "Edgar Allan Poe's Predicament".
