= Aurea =

Aurea, golden in Latin, may refer to:

- Aromantic-spectrum Union for Recognition, Education, and Advocacy (AUREA), an advocacy organization for aromanticism
- Aurea (car), a former Italian automobile manufactured in Turin from 1921 to 1930
- Aurea (singer) (born 1987), Portuguese singer
- Aurea Alexandrina, a kind of opiate or antidote
- Áurea, a municipality in the state Rio Grande do Sul, Brazil
- Aurès Mountains, a mountain range in Algeria and Tunisia
- Dioscuri Aurea Saecula, the first demo tape of the Italian National Socialist black metal band Cain
- Domus Aurea (Latin, "Golden House"), a large landscaped portico villa, residence of the Roman emperor Nero
- Ducati Aurea, a motorcycle made from 1958 to 1962
- Legenda Aurea, the Golden Legend, a collection of hagiographies by Jacobus de Voragine
- Legenda Aurea (band), a Swiss heavy metal band
- Lei Áurea, the Golden Law, a law adopted in 1888 that abolished slavery in Brazil
- Ulmus × viminalis 'Aurea', a hybrid cultivar
- Ulmus americana 'Aurea', an American Elm cultivar

== See also ==
- Aurea (given name)
- Aureus (disambiguation)
- Auratus (disambiguation)
- Saint Aurea (disambiguation)
