= Metzengerstein =

1832 short story by Edgar Allan Poe

- Short story by Edgar Allan Poe
- Country: United States
- Language: English
- Genre: Horror short story

Publication
- Published in: Saturday Courier
- Media type: Print (Periodical)
- Publication date: January 14, 1832

"Metzengerstein: A Tale in Imitation of the German" is a short story by American writer and poet Edgar Allan Poe, his first to see print. It was first published in the pages of Philadelphia's Saturday Courier magazine, in 1832. The story follows the young Frederick, the last of the Metzengerstein family, who carries on a long-standing feud with the Berlifitzing family. Suspected of causing a fire that kills the Berlifitzing family patriarch, Frederick becomes intrigued with a previously unnoticed and untamed horse. Metzengerstein is punished for his cruelty when his own home catches fire and the horse carries him into the flame. Part of a Latin hexameter by Martin Luther serves as the story's epigraph: Pestis eram vivus—moriens tua mors ero ("Living I have been your plague, dying I shall be your death").

"Metzengerstein" follows many conventions of Gothic fiction and, to some, exaggerates those conventions. Consequently, critics and scholars debate if Poe intended the story to be taken seriously or considered a satire of Gothic stories. Regardless, many elements introduced in "Metzengerstein" would become common in Poe's future writing. Because the story follows an orphan raised in an aristocratic household, some critics suggest an autobiographical connection with its author.

The story was submitted as Poe's entry to a writing contest at the Saturday Courier. Though it did not win, the newspaper published it in January 1832. It was re-published with Poe's permission only twice during his lifetime; its subtitle was dropped for its final publication. Poe intended to include it in his collection Tales of the Folio Club or another called Phantasy Pieces, but neither collection was ever produced.

== Plot summary ==
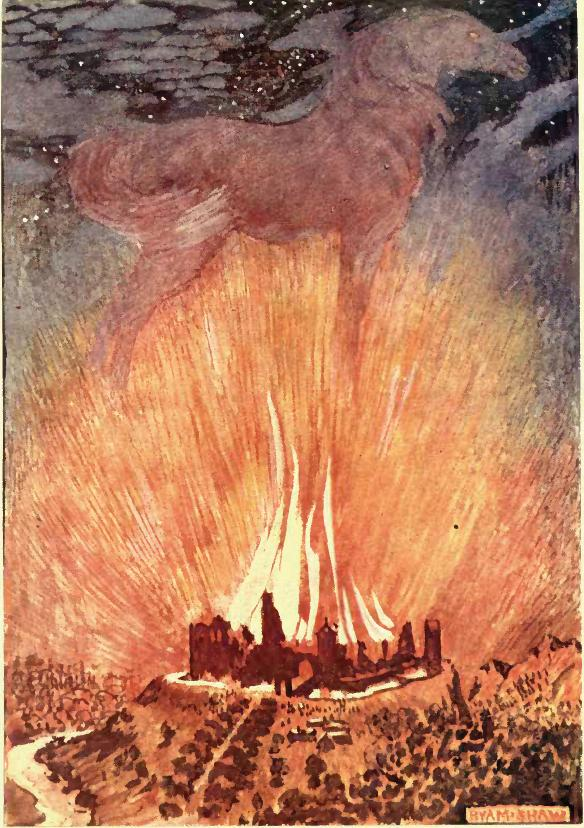
Illustration by Byam Shaw for a London edition dated 1909

The story, told by an unnamed third-person narrator, takes place in Hungary at an unspecified date. There is a rivalry between two wealthy families—the Metzengersteins and the Berlifitzings—which is so old that no one knows how far back it dates. The narrator states that its origin appears to rely on an "ancient" prophecy: "A lofty name shall have a fearful fall when, as the rider over his horse, the mortality of Metzengerstein shall triumph over the immortality of Berlifitzing."

Frederick, Baron of Metzengerstein, is orphaned at a young age, inheriting the family fortune at age 18 (though the age changes throughout its many re-publications). Equipped with enormous wealth and power, he begins to exhibit particularly cruel behavior. Four days after he receives his inheritance, the stables of the rival family Berlifitzing catch fire. The neighborhood attributes the act of arson to Frederick.

That day, Metzengerstein sits staring intently at an old tapestry depicting "an enormous, and unnaturally colored horse" that belonged to the Berlifitzing clan. Behind the horse its rider has just been killed by "the dagger of a Metzengerstein". Frederick opens the door to leave, and the action causes his shadow to fall exactly on the spot of the murderer in the tapestry. Outside, his men are handling a horse. They tell Frederick that this new horse has been found in his stables with the letters "W.V.B." branded on its forehead. The equerry supposes they stand for William Von Berlifitzing. However, the grooms of the Berlifitzing stable do not recognize the horse. Frederick takes ownership of the horse. He later hears that Wilhelm Berlifitzing died in the fire as he tried to save one of his horses in the burning stable.

Frederick and the horse become seemingly inseparable. He rides the animal as if addicted, and he becomes less and less interested in the affairs of his house and of society. He eventually begins to live in seclusion to the extent that others in the neighborhood suspect that he is either mad, sick, or overwhelmingly conceited. One night, Frederick awakes and maniacally mounts the horse to ride into the forest. Some hours later, his castle catches fire. A crowd gathers to watch the flames and see the horse carrying "an unbonneted and disordered rider" who clearly has no control over the animal. The horse leaps into the flames with its rider, thereby killing the last of the Metzengerstein clan. Immediately, the fire dies away. In the calm, the onlookers observe a cloud of smoke settle above the castle in the shape of a horse.

== Publication history ==
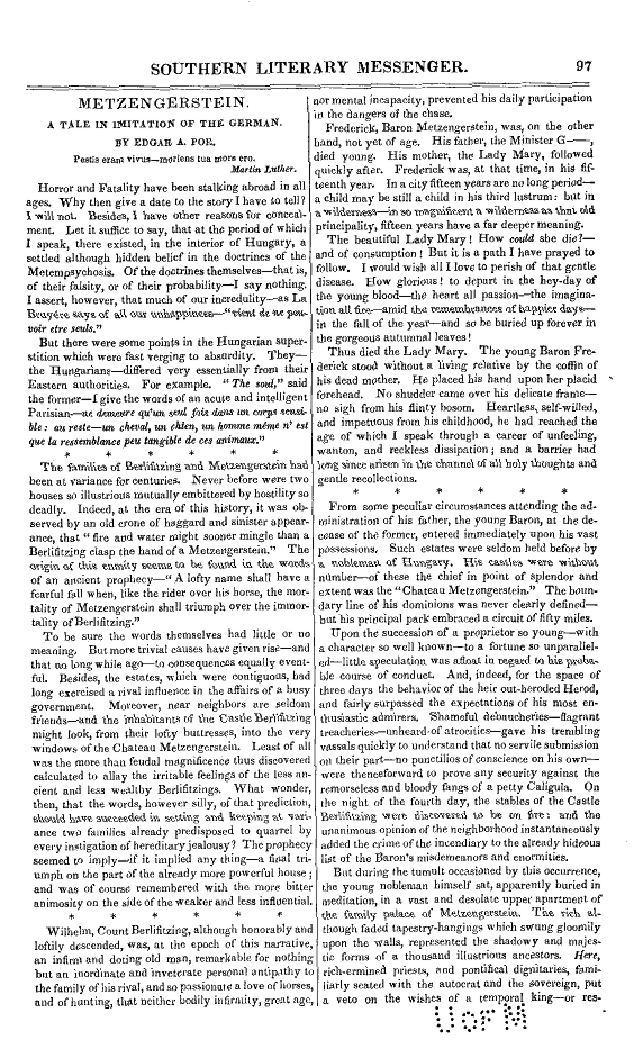
"Metzengerstein", as republished in the Southern Literary Messenger in January 1836

Poe originally sent "Metzengerstein" to the Saturday Courier as his entry to a writing competition along with five other prose works, including "The Duke de l'Omelette" and "A Decided Loss". None of his entries won, though the judges apparently liked "Metzengerstein" enough to print it a few months later in their January 14, 1832 edition. It was published without Poe's name attached to it but it is acknowledged as the first tale published by Poe. Poe likely was not paid for its initial publication. The subtitle of "A Tale in Imitation of the German" was added when it was republished in the Southern Literary Messenger in January 1836, likely to capitalize on the popular interest in German horror. It was removed for its publication as part of the collection Tales of the Grotesque and Arabesque in 1840.

"Metzengerstein" was one of 11 tales Poe would have collected as Tales of the Folio Club, a tale collection Poe announced but never actually printed. The "Folio Club" would have been a fictitious literary society based on the Delphian Club that the author called a group of "dunderheads" out to "abolish literature". At each monthly meeting, a member would present a story. In the case of "Metzengerstein", the speaker was "Mr. Horrible Dictû, with white eyelashes, who had graduated at Gottingen" according to an early draft. The Baltimore Saturday Visiter ran an advertisement calling for subscribers for the collection at $1 apiece. A week later, however, the newspaper announced that the author had withdrawn the pieces with the expectation they would be printed in Philadelphia, Pennsylvania. Poe also considered publishing "Metzengerstein" in a collection of stories to be called Phantasy Pieces as "The Horse-Shade", though the edition was never printed.

In its first several publications, "Metzengerstein" included a line about the mother's death by consumption. The narrator says: "It is a path I have prayed to follow. I would wish all I love to perish of that gentle disease." When Poe was still a child, his own mother, Eliza Poe, died, presumably of consumption. His wife Virginia also had tuberculosis and died in 1847. After her death, Poe altered his personal view of fictional heroines who were sick and idealized sick women while wishing for their death. This more romantic view of death was not uncommon in writing, as in John Keats's "Ode to a Nightingale", which may have inspired Poe.

== Analysis ==
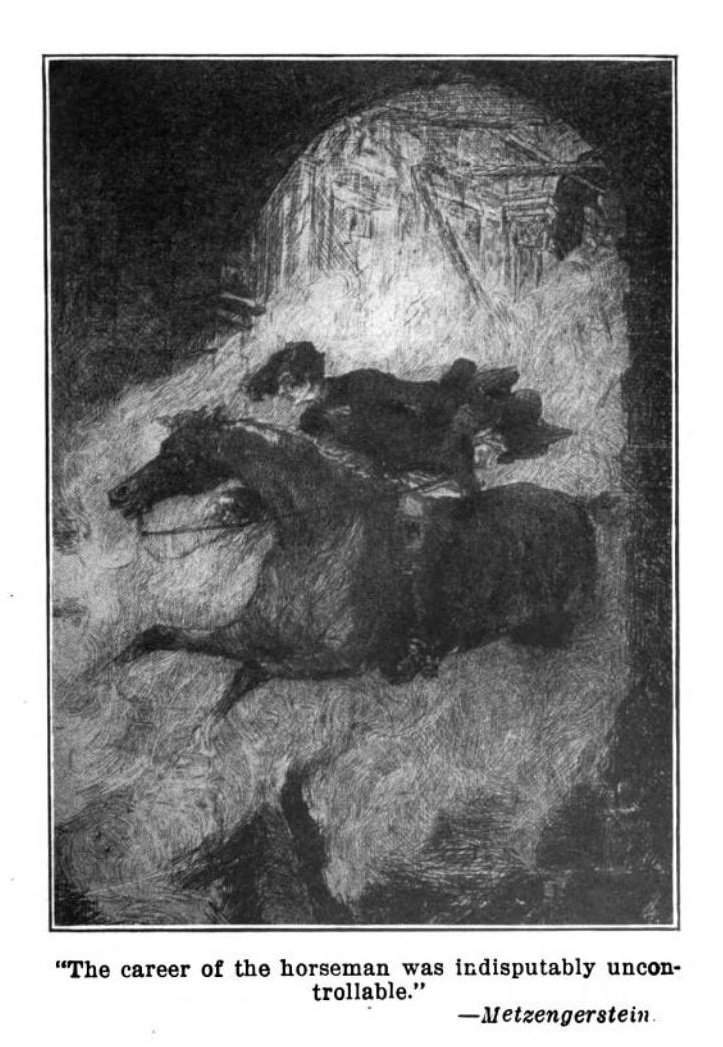
"The career of the horseman was indisputably uncontrollable", 1902

Though not explicitly stated, it is implied that the horse is really Berlifitzing. The first paragraph of the story references metempsychosis, the belief that the soul of a person is transferred to another living being upon death. Other evidence is the tapestry, the lack of a history or recognition in the horse and, certainly, the prophecy referencing the immortality of the Berlifitzings. The story can be read as an allegory, a warning that a human soul can be overtaken by the evil it has created. Such evil may be interpreted as having been created by a person's hatred and pride.

Poe imitates many traditional "Germanic" elements in this tale. The most obvious example is the gloomy old castle, typical of Gothic fiction. The story also includes typical Gothic themes, which scholar Dawn Sova refers to as "hints at secret obsessions and sins, foreboding prophecies, family rivalry". These Gothic conventions had been a staple of popular fiction in Europe and the United States for several decades by the time Poe utilized them. Considering the subtitle, "A Tale in Imitation of the German", critics and scholars disagree if Poe may have, in fact, intended the story as a satire or burlesque of the genre, purposely exaggerating the elements of the Gothic to be humorous. Other evidence is that all of the other three stories Poe published in 1832 ("The Duc de l'Omelette", "A Tale of Jerusalem", and "Bon-Bon") are comic tales written, as Poe said, "intended for half banter, half satire". The story also uses irony as a form of humor: Despite the family's prophecy that "the mortality of Metzengerstein shall triumph over the immortality of Berlifitzing", the opposite occurs. The suggestion that "Metzengerstein" is purposefully written as a satire has been disputed, especially because of Poe's revisions throughout its many republications where he removed some of the more exaggerated material.

The German or, more generally, European overtones give the story a medieval setting, though the time and place of the plot is left indistinct. The atmosphere of the story combines both realistic and supernatural worlds while depicting pathological emotional states, likely influenced by the works of Ludwig Tieck and E. T. A. Hoffmann. It has been called a precursor to "The Fall of the House of Usher" and other later works. Among the elements Poe first uses in "Metzengerstein" which will become typical in his later works are the decaying and gloomy building with oddly shaped rooms, the remote, secluded property, vivid colors, and underground vaults as well as themes of vengeance and the overwhelming power of evil. Future works will also depict characters of extreme wealth; besides Metzengerstein, other examples are Roderick Usher, the narrator in "Ligeia" and Legrand's restored fortune in "The Gold-Bug". Poe also uses teeth as a symbol for the first time in "Metzengerstein". The horse's teeth are described as "sepulchral and disgusting". Poe would later use teeth as a sign of mortality, as in lips writhing about the teeth of the mesmerized man in "The Facts in the Case of M. Valdemar", the sound of grating teeth in "Hop-Frog", and the obsession over teeth in "Berenice". Death by fire would later be reused in Poe's story "Hop-Frog" as another punishment. Though Poe was emulating popular horror fiction of the time, "Metzengerstein" shows what made Poe's horror tales stand out: rather than focusing on blood and gore, he explored the minds of the characters to better understand them.

The story has some autobiographical overtones as well, with the castle representing Moldavia, the Richmond home of Poe's foster-father John Allan. The Count, in this reading, would represent John Allan, and Poe the young Metzengerstein. Both Poe and Metzengerstein are orphaned at a young age. Poe may have found writing the story therapeutic; in it, he destroys "John Allan", though he is also destroyed in return. In focusing on the final fire scene, Poe may have been recalling the fatal Richmond Theatre fire of December 1811 which occurred three weeks after his mother, the actress Eliza Poe, had died.

== Critical response ==
The German nature of "Metzengerstein" and other stories in the collection Tales of the Grotesque and Arabesque was mentioned in a review by Joseph C. Neal in the Pennsylvanian on December 6, 1839: "These grotesque and arabesque delineations are full of variety, now irresistibly quaint and droll, and again marked with all the deep and painful interest of the German school". Rudyard Kipling was an admirer of Poe and once wrote, "My own personal debt to Poe is a heavy one". "Metzengerstein" was an inspiration to his story "The Phantom 'Rickshaw", where the main character is punished by the horse of someone he has murdered.

== Adaptations ==
"Metzengerstein" was adapted into a segment directed by Roger Vadim of the 1968 anthology film Histoires extraordinaires. The segment stars Jane Fonda and Peter Fonda.

Romanian composer Joan Balan wrote a musical score for piano in 1934 based on the story called Das Feuerpferd.

Italian singer Lord Vampyr, famous for his work with Theatres des Vampires, has a song named "Metzengerstein" in his 2010 album Horror Masterpiece. The song's lyrics heavily allude to the tale.
