= Saint Aurea =

Saint Aurea may refer to:

- Aurea of Córdoba (810–856), Spanish saint, nun, and martyr
- Aurea of Ostia, 3rd-century martyr
- Áurea of San Millán (1043–1070), 11th-century Spanish saint
- Saint Aurea of Paris, a 7th-century Parisien abbess and saint from Syria

== See also ==
- Santa Aurea, a church in Ostia
- Aurea (disambiguation)
