= Saint Asterius =

Saint Asterius may refer to:

- Asterius of Ostia (d. c. 222), Priest and hieromartyr
- Asterius of Caesarea (d. 282), Roman senator who became a Christian martyr
- Asterius of Petra (d. 365), convert from Arianism and Bishop of Petra
- Asterius of Amasea (c. 350 – c. 410 AD), Bishop of Amasea between 380 and 390
