= De Vampyrica Philosophia =

Studio album by Lord Vampyr
- Released: 6 February 2005
- Genre: Symphonic black metal
- Length: 37:25
- Label: Officina Rock
- Producer: Stefano Morabito

Lord Vampyr chronology
De Vampyrica Philosophia (2005)	Blood Bathory (2007)

Professional ratings
Review scores
Source	Rating
Metalitalia.com	6.5/10
Noise.fi	3/5

De Vampyrica Philosophia is the debut solo studio album by Italian extreme metal vocalist Lord Vampyr, released on 6 February 2005 through Officina Rock Records. The album was Lord Vampyr's first release following his departure from Theatres des Vampires. The title is a pun on the famous occult treatise De Occulta Philosophia.

The spoken-word portion of the track "De Vampyrica Philosophia" was taken from the opening lines of the 2003 film The Order, and the instrumentation is sampled from the 1992 film Bram Stoker's Dracula.

Tracks 6 and 7 contain quotations from poems by Oscar Wilde.

== Critical reception ==
Noise.fi called the compositions good but lyrics terrible and album overall unoriginal. Metalitalia.com said the production is very good and noted the singer as versatile but called the album too similar to Cradle of Filth.

== Track listing ==
All tracks are written by Lord Vampyr.

No.	Title	Length
1.	"De Vampyrica Philosophia"	1:38
2.	"Carmilla... Whispers from the Grave"	4:57
3.	"A Sad Litany of Vampires"	5:00
4.	"Nocturnal Vampire's Orgy"	3:56
5.	"Blood Lovers"	2:37
6.	"Morgana"	4:33
7.	"The Ophelia's Ghost"	3:20
8.	"Die Herrschaft des Blutes" I. "Dracula's Guest" II. "Draculea, Prince of Wallachia"	10:44
9.	"...Now... Sleep..." (instrumental)	0:34

- "Die Herrschaft des Blutes" is German for "Reign of Blood".

== Personnel ==
- Lord Vampyr (Alessandro Nunziati) – vocals, drum programming
- Count Morgoth (Roberto Cufaro) – guitars, keyboards
- Alexiel – keyboards
- Nighthorn (Silvano Leone) – bass
- Stefano Morabito – production, additional guitars (track 8)
