= The Duc de L'Omelette =

Humorous short story by Edgar Allan Poe

- Short story by Edgar Allan Poe
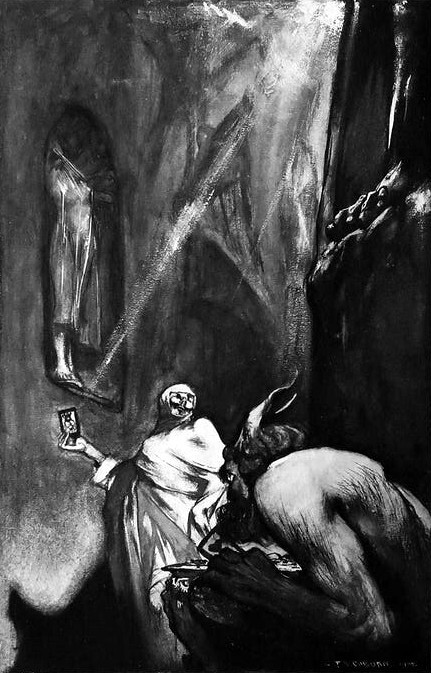
- The Duc L'Omelette (1902) by Frank Coburn
- Country: United States
- Language: English

Publication
- Published in: The Saturday Courier
- Publication type: Newspaper
- Publication date: March 3, 1832

"The Duc de L'Omelette" is a humorous short story by American writer Edgar Allan Poe. It was first published in the Philadelphia Saturday Courier on March 3, 1832, and was subsequently revised a number of times by the author.

== Plot summary ==
The Duc de L'Omelette dies while dining on an ortolan and finds himself in hell: an apartment filled with various works of art that has a window overlooking a fiery landscape. Face to face with Satan, the Duc manages to avoid damnation by cheating him at a game of cards.

The epigraph is from William Cowper's poem "The Task", and reads: "And stepped at once into a cooler clime."

== Publication history ==
Poe originally titled the story "The Duke of L'Omelette" when it was published in the March 3, 1832, issue of the Philadelphia Saturday Courier. It was one of four comedic tales Poe published anonymously in that newspaper that year, along with "A Tale of Jerusalem", "A Decided Loss" (later renamed "Loss of Breath"), and "The Bargain Lost" (later renamed "Bon-Bon"). The Saturday Courier had previously published Poe's "Metzengerstein" in January 1832; it was the author's first prose work to appear in print. The five stories were submitted to the Saturday Courier as entries to a writing contest. Though the winner of the $50 prize was Delia Bacon, the editors published Poe's submissions anyway; he was likely never compensated.

Poe later compiled "The Duke of L'Omelette" with other short stories in the Tales of the Grotesque and Arabesque collection.

== Analysis ==
The story is intended as a satire on the works of Nathaniel Parker Willis.
