= Pleasure and Pain (Theatres des Vampires album) =

Studio album by Theatres des Vampires
- Released: (United Kingdom) 10 November 2005
- Genre: Gothic metal
- Length: 44:44
- Label: Dreamcell11/Aural Music

Theatres des Vampires chronology
Nightbreed of Macabria (2004)	Pleasure and Pain (2005)	Anima Noir (2008)

Professional ratings
Review scores
Source	Rating
Desibeli.net	3.5/5
Metal.de	5/10
Metalitalia.com	6.5/10
Noise.fi	1/5

Pleasure and Pain is the seventh studio album by the Italian gothic metal band Theatres des Vampires. It is the first album after Lord Vampyr's departure, and the first to feature Sonya Scarlet as the main vocalist of the band as well as being the last to feature Robert Cufaro on guitar. The album was released in the UK on 10 November 2005, and in Germany on 18 November 2005, followed with a wide EU release on 28 November 2005, and with a Russian release on 6 December 2005.

== Critical reception ==
Powermetal.de called it a very solid and sophisticated record that have to be re-listened several times to appreciate. Noise.fi said the band doesn't manage to build a gothic atmosphere and called the songs weak. Metalitalia.com liked the singer's performance but said the album lacks aggression and gothic atmosphere. Desibeli.net noted the album as an improvement over the previous one and highlighted the tracks "Pleasure and Pain", "Solitude", "Forever in Death", and "Mater Tenebrarum". Metal.de gave a negative review and said the album doesn't offer anything new to the genre but manages to have a dark atmosphere.

== Track listing ==
No.	Title	Lyrics	Music	Length
1.	"Pleasure and Pain"	Sonya Scarlet	Fabian Varesi	4:04
2.	"Never Again"	Sonya Scarlet	Robert Cufaro	3:26
3.	"Rosa Mistero"	Sonya Scarlet	Fabian Varesi	4:04
4.	"Solitude"	Sonya Scarlet	Robert Cufaro	3:37
5.	"My Lullaby"	Sonya Scarlet with quotes from Novalis	Robert Cufaro	4:02
6.	"Forever in Death"	Sonya Scarlet	Robert Cufaro	3:49
7.	"Let Me Die"	Sonya Scarlet	Fabian Varesi	4:44
8.	"Black Mirror"	Sonya Scarlet	Fabian Varesi	3:32
9.	"Reason and Sense"	Sonya Scarlet with quotes from Giosuè Carducci	Fabian Varesi	5:32
Total length:				44:44

=== Bonus tracks ===
No.	Title	Lyrics	Music	Length
10.	"Mater Tenebrarum" (Keith Emerson cover, from the soundtrack of the film Inferno by Dario Argento)	Keith Emerson, Salmon with quotes from Thomas de Quincey	Keith Emerson	3:54
11.	"Pleasure and Pain" (Remixed by B. Kramm of Das Ich)	Sonya Scarlet	Fabian Varesi, B. Kramm	3:59
Total length:				44:44

== Line-up ==
- Sonya Scarlet − vocals
- Fabian Varesi − keyboards, backing vocal
- Gabriel Valerio − drums
- Zimon Lijoi − bass, backing vocal
- Robert Cufaro − guitars

=== Guest members ===
- Flegias (Necrodeath) − male scream on "Forever in Death"
- Dhilorz (Ancient) − male scream on "Black Mirror"
- Nicholas (Ensoph) − male clean voice on "Pleasure and Pain"
- Giampaolo Caprino (Stormlord) − male clean voice on all tracks.
