= Auratus =

Auratus can refer to:

- Jean Daurat (or Dorat) (1508 – 1588), a French poet and influential classical scholar
- Pierre Doré (c.1500 – 1559), a French Dominican theologian

A Latin word often used in taxonomy for species names. Auratus comes from the Latin root aurat-, meaning "gold" or "golden", and is consequently used to designate species of this colour. Species labelled auratus include:

- The northern flicker, Colaptes auratus
- The goldfish, Carassius auratus
- The golden hamster, Mesocricetus auratus
- A fish called the Malawi golden cichlid, Melanochromis auratus
- Pagrus auratus, a fish known in Australia and New Zealand as the snapper
- A fish found in the Nile called Chrysichthys auratus
- A Tasmanian fish called the golden galaxias, Galaxias auratus
- The green and black poison dart frog, Dendrobates auratus
- The Madagascar starling, Hartlaubius auratus
- The Levant skink, Euprepis auratus
- The dogbane leaf beetle, Chrysochus auratus

== See also ==
- Aurea (disambiguation)
- Aureus (disambiguation)
