= Nightbreed of Macabria =

Studio album by Theatres des Vampires
- Released: May 21, 2004
- Genre: Gothic metal
- Length: 66:56
- Label: Blackend

Theatres des Vampires chronology
Vampyrìsme... (2003)	Nightbreed of Macabria (2004)	Pleasure and Pain (2005)

Professional ratings
Review scores
Source	Rating
Desibeli.net	2.5/5
Noise.fi	4/5

Nightbreed of Macabria is the sixth studio album by the band Theatres des Vampires. This album is their first to not contain any black metal influence and is credited as a pure goth metal release. This was also frontman Lord Vampyr's last album with Theatres des Vampires.

It is a concept album dealing with the fictional world of Macabria. The album was highly influenced by the works of American film producer Tim Burton.

== Critical reception ==
Desibeli.net recommended the album for fans of light and melodic gothic rock but said to skip the album if you are a fan of the band's earlier output. Noise.fi gave a positive review and highlighted the tracks "A Macabre Banquet", "Lady in Black", "Mourning Day", and "The Undertaker & the Crow".

== Track listing ==
No.	Title	Lyrics	Music	Length
1.	"Welcome to Macabria"	R. Sciamanna	Fabian	2:23
2.	"A Macabre Banquet"	Alexander	Robert	4:10
3.	"Lady in Black"	Alexander	Alexander, Robert, Fabian	4:17
4.	"Angel of Lust"	R. Sciamanna	Robert	5:20
5.	"Luciferia"	Alexander	Alexander	5:30
6.	"Incubo I"	R. Sciamanna	Fabian	1:38
7.	"Macabria"	Alexander	Alexander, Robert, Fabian	4:30
8.	"The Jester's Shadow"	R. Sciamanna	Robert	4:03
9.	"The Golden Sin"	R. Sciamanna	Fabian	4:28
10.	"Carnival Day"	R. Sciamanna	Zimon, Alexander, Theatres des Vampires	4:48
11.	"Incubo II"	R. Sciamanna	Fabian	1:13
12.	"The Curse of Headless Christ"	R. Sciamanna	Alexander	5:48
13.	"Mourning Day"	Alexander	Alexander, Fabian	4:14
14.	"The Undertaker & the Crow"	Alexander	Fabian	4:33
15.	"The Beginning of the End"	Alexander	Fabian	5:15
Total length:				66:56

== Line-up ==
- Alexander − vocals, acoustic guitar, backing vocals
- Scarlet − vocals
- Fabian − keyboards, samples, backing vocals
- Robert − guitars, acoustic guitar
- Zimon − bass
- Gabriel − drums, backing vocals

=== Guest members ===
- Claudia Cucinelli − choir
- Francesco Grasso − choir
- Stefano Dimitri − violins
- Angela Moranti − viola
- Marta Di Russo − cello
- Erick Frontier − horns
- Mauro Denti − wind instruments
- R. Sciamanna − lyrics
