= Gothika Vampyrika Heretika =

Album by Alexander Nunziati

Studio album by Lord Vampyr
- Released: 21 September 2013
- Genre: Industrial metal, gothic metal, symphonic black metal, extreme metal
- Length: 40:37
- Label: Crank Music Group
- Producer: Kami Kopat, Lord Vampyr

Lord Vampyr chronology
Vampyria (2010)	Gothika Vampyrika Heretika (2013)

Professional ratings
Review scores
Source	Rating
Desibeli.net	4/5
V2.fi	3/5

Gothika Vampyrika Heretika is the fourth solo studio album by Italian extreme metal vocalist Lord Vampyr, released on 21 September 2013 through Crank Music Group. The album continues the industrial/gothic sonority started with 2010's Horror Masterpiece, while reincorporating some of the symphonic/extreme metal elements of his first two records.

A teaser 7" single containing the track "Lamia" was released on 22 July 2013.

== Critical reception ==
Desibeli.net said the album's only blemish is the cover song "It's a Sin". V2.fi said the title track is the best song on the album.

== Track listing ==
All tracks are written by Lord Vampyr, except for "It's a Sin" by Chris Lowe and Neil Tennant.

No.	Title	Length
1.	"Theda Bara"	5:13
2.	"Lamia"	4:34
3.	"Gothika Vampyrika Heretika"	4:20
4.	"The Night Chronicles (Part I)"	4:06
5.	"Till Dawn"	3:46
6.	"Ghost"	5:25
7.	"The Night Chronicles (Part II)"	5:07
8.	"It's a Sin" (Pet Shop Boys cover)	3:55
9.	"Kingdom of Fear"	4:11

== Personnel ==
- Lord Vampyr (Alessandro Nunziati) – vocals
- Seth 666 (Andrea Taddei) – guitars
- STN Zyklon (Michele Arnone) – guitars
- Helvete (Ferenc Nádasdy) – keyboards
- Aerioch (Andrea di Nino) – bass
- Aeternus (Diego Tasciotti) – drums
- Kami Kopat – production, mastering
