= Moonlight Waltz =

2011 studio album by Theatres des Vampires

Studio album by Theatres des Vampires
- Released: January 14, 2011 (Europe); February 7, 2011 (North America)
- Genre: Gothic metal
- Length: 57:24
- Label: (Italy) Dreamcell11/Aural Music/Audioglobe (European Union) Soulfood/Sony Music
- Producer: Christian Ice

Theatres des Vampires chronology
Anima Noir (2008)	Moonlight Waltz (2011)	Candyland (2016)

Professional ratings
Review scores
Source	Rating
Metal.de	7/10
Metalitalia.com	7.5/10

Moonlight Waltz is the ninth studio album by the Italian gothic metal band Theatres des Vampires. A music video for the song "Carmilla" was filmed on August 28 and 29, directed by David Bracci, who worked on most of Dario Argento's films in the past decade and directed the "Lilith Mater Inferorum" music video.

== Critical reception ==
Times of Malta compared the band to HIM and said that most of the album "is guaranteed to please those with Gothic inclinations." Metal.de said the album is more accessible than their previous ones but overall called the album a bit too unoriginal. Metalitalia.com said the album features the band's best production so far. They noted the songs "Black Madonna", "The Gates of Hades", and "Carmilla" as excellent.

== Track listing ==
No.	Title	Lyrics	Music	Length
1.	"Keeper of Secrets" (feat. Snowy Shaw)	Sonya Scarlet	Fabian Varesi	5:25
2.	"Fly Away"	Luca Bellanova	Luca Bellanova	3:31
3.	"Moonlight Waltz"	Sonya Scarlet with quotes from Christina Rossetti	Fabian Varesi	4:28
4.	"Carmilla"	Sonya Scarlet with quotes from Sheridan Le Fanu	Fabian Varesi	4:59
5.	"Sangue"	Sonya Scarlet	Fabian Varesi	3:59
6.	"Figlio della Luna" (Mecano cover)	José María Cano	José María Cano	4:22
7.	"Black Madonna"	Sonya Scarlet	Fabian Varesi, Stephan Benfante	4:59
8.	"Illusion"	Sonya Scarlet	Fabian Varesi	5:01
9.	"Le Grand Guignol" (feat. Cadaveria)	Sonya Scarlet	Fabian Varesi, Stephan Benfante	3:57
10.	"Obsession"	Sonya Scarlet	Christian Ice	4:25
11.	"The Gates of Hades"	Sonya Scarlet with quotes from Horace	Fabian Varesi	3:32
12.	"Medousa" (feat. Eva Breznikar)	Sonya Scarlet	Fabian Varesi, Stephan Benfante	4:37
13.	"Carmilla" (Radio edit, bonus track on all versions except iTunes)	Sonya Scarlet	Fabian Varesi	4:06
Total length:				57:24

Limited Edition Bonus DVD

1. Carmilla [Official Video]
2. The Making of Carmilla
3. The Drummer Solo
4. Moonlight Waltz Photo Session Backstage And Interviews
5. Photo Gallery
6. Credits

== Personnel ==
- Sonya Scarlet − vocals
- Fabian Varesi − keyboards and backing vocals
- Gabriel Valerio − drums and percussions
- Zimon Lijoi − bass guitar and backing vocals
- Stephan Benfante − guitars and backing vocals

=== Guest members ===
- Luca Bellanova (Temple of Noise arranger, Starkiller Sound) – Cello, guitars, male backing vocals, orchestral direction, orchestral arrangement and songwriting (track 2)
- Christian Ice (Temple of Noise producer, Starkiller Sound) – Guitars, male backing vocals (harsh), songwriting (track 10)
- Giorgia Martinez Pascucci (Santa Cecilia young orchestra) – Violin
- Mario Fibonacci – Extra strings
- Eliza Pezzuto (Eli) – Female backing vocals and extra vocals on "Figlio della Luna"
- Marco Benevento (The Foreshadowing) – Male vocals on "Black Madonna"
- Cadaveria (Opera IX) – Female scream on "Le Grand Guignol"
- Snowy Shaw (Therion, Mercyful Fate, Notre Dame) – Male vocals on "Keepers of Secrets"
- Eva Breznikar (Laibach) – Female vocals on "Medousa"
- Sofia – Child vocals on "Keepers of Secrets"

== Live release ==
Moonlight Waltz Tour 2011 cover art

Moonlight Waltz Tour 2011 is a 2012 live CD and DVD, recorded during the tour supporting the album. It is the first all-in-one live CD and DVD release from the band, though the band have released one live CD (Desire of Damnation) and one live DVD (The Addiction Tour 2006), separately. In addition to the live tracks, the CD contains three new studio songs from The Cult of Lamia soundtrack. The limited edition package also includes a 40-page book.

Metal.de said the three new songs are not up to the same quality as the songs from the associated studio album.

=== Track listing ===
CD

No.	Title	Length
1.	"My Winter Storm (Cult Of Lamia part I - studio track)"
2.	"The Lost Grace (Cult Of Lamia part II – studio track)"
3.	"Apart (Cult Of Lamia part III – studio track)"
4.	"Keeper of Secrets (live)"
5.	"Bring me Back (live)"
6.	"Lilith Mater Inferorum (live)"
7.	"Angel of Lust (live)"
8.	"Sangue (live)"
9.	"Le Grand Guignol (live)"
10.	"Unspoken Words (live)"
11.	"Carmilla (live)"
12.	"Blood Addiction (live)"
13.	"La Danse Macabre du Vampire (live)"
14.	"Kain (live)"

DVD

No.	Title	Length
1.	"Keeper of Secrets"
2.	"Bring me Back"
3.	"Lilith Mater Inferorum"
4.	"Angel of Lust"
5.	"Sangue"
6.	"Le Grand Guignol"
7.	"Wherever you Are"
8.	"Unspoken Words"
9.	"Rain"
10.	"Dracula Theme"
11.	"Carmilla"
12.	"Medousa"
13.	"Blood Addiction"
14.	"The Gates of Hades"
15.	"La Danse Macabre du Vampire"
16.	"Kain"
17.	"Pleasure and Pain"

The DVD also contains a trailer and behind the scenes of "Cult of Lamia".
