= Anima Noir =

Studio album by Theatres des Vampires
- Released: April 25, 2008
- Genre: Gothic metal
- Length: 45:19
- Label: (Italy) Aural Music/Audioglobe (European Union) Aural Music/SPV (France) Aural Music/Season of Mist
- Producer: Christian Ice

Theatres des Vampires chronology
Pleasure and Pain (2005)	Anima Noir (2008)	Moonlight Waltz (2011)

Professional ratings
Review scores
Source	Rating
Desibeli.net	4/5
Metal.de	7/10
Metalitalia.com	7.0/10
Noise.fi	2/5

Anima Noir is the eighth studio album by the Italian gothic metal band Theatres des Vampires.

== Critical reception ==
Powermetal.de gave a positive review and recommended the tracks "Unspoken Words" and "Two Seconds". Desibeli.net said the band has evolved into a stronger group and noted "Kain" as one of the band's catchiest songs. Metalitalia.com called it a polished and enjoyable album. Noise.fi said the band sounds professional but said the compositions are not good. Metal.de liked the album and said the band stands out with its extensive keyboards and extravagant synths. Vampster gave a negative review and called the band's brand of gothic metal interchangeable and unchallenging.

== Track listing ==
All lyrics are written by Sonya Scarlet, except for track 3. Extra arrangements by Christian Ice and Luca Bellanova.

No.	Title	Music	Length
1.	"Kain"	Fabian Varesi, Hanna Kej	4:33
2.	"Unspoken Words"	Fabian Varesi, Stephan Benfante	4:55
3.	"Rain" (The Cult cover)	Ian Astbury, Billy Duffy	4:00
4.	"Dust"	Fabian Varesi	4:48
5.	"From the Deep"	Fabian Varesi	5:17
6.	"Blood Addiction"	Fabian Varesi, Stephan Benfante, Hanna Kej	4:07
7.	"Butterfly"	Fabian Varesi, Stephan Benfante, Hanna Kej	4:12
8.	"Wherever You Are"	Fabian Varesi, Icy X	4:52
9.	"Two Seconds"	Fabian Varesi, Icy X	4:09
10.	"Anima Noir"	Fabian Varesi, Zimon Lijoi	4:20
Total length:			45:19

== Personnel ==
- Sonya Scarlet − vocals
- Fabian Varesi − keyboards and backing vocals
- Gabriel Valerio − drums
- Zimon Lijoi − bass
- Stephan Benfante − guitars

=== Guest members ===
- Hanna Kej − backing vocals, songwriting on tracks 1, 6 and 7
- Christian Ice − backing vocals, production and extra arrangements
- Luca Bellanova − backing vocals and extra arrangements
- Icy X − songwriting on tracks 8 and 9
