= Suicide Vampire =

Studio album by Theatres des Vampires
- Released: October 23, 2002
- Genre: Gothic metal; symphonic black metal
- Length: 42:02
- Label: Blackend Records

Theatres des Vampires chronology
| Iubilaeum Anno Dracula 2001 (2001) | Suicide Vampire (2002) | Vampyrìsme... (2003) |

Professional ratings
Review scores
| Source | Rating |
|---|---|
| Metal.de | 7/10 |
| Rock Hard | 6.5/10 |

Suicide Vampire is the fourth album from the Italian gothic black metal band Theatres des Vampires. The Theatres des Vampires drummer Gabriel Valerio was unavailable during the recording of the album, so the drums were recorded by Nick A. for this album.

== Critical reception ==
Metal.de highlighted the tracks "La Danse Macabre du Vampire", "Il Vampiro", and "Enthrone the Dark Angel" and recommended the album for fans of melodic black metal and keyboard-oriented gothic metal. Vampster gave a negative review and recommended bands like Cradle of Filth and Notre Dame instead.

== Track listing ==
| No. | Title | Lyrics | Music | Extra guitar arrangements | Length |
|---|---|---|---|---|---|
| 1. | "Theatre of Horrors" | Alexander | Alexander | Morgoth | 4:06 |
| 2. | "Lilith Mater Inferorum" | Alexander | Alexander, Fabian Varesi | Morgoth | 3:45 |
| 3. | "La Danse Macabre du Vampire" | Alexander | Alexander, Fabian Varesi | Morgoth | 3:39 |
| 4. | "Queen of the Damned" | Alexander | Alexander, Fabian Varesi | Morgoth | 4:19 |
| 5. | "Bloodlust" | Alexander | Alexander, Fabian Varesi | Morgoth | 4:32 |
| 6. | "Tenebra Dentro" | Alexander | Alex Pallotta | Morgoth | 4:29 |
| 7. | "Suicide Vampire" | Alexander with quotes from Ugo Foscolo | Alexander, Fabian Varesi | Morgoth | 5:48 |
| 8. | "Il Vampiro" | Alexander | Fabian Varesi | Morgoth | 4:25 |
| 9. | "Der Makabere Tanz des Vampires" (Extended german version) | Alexander | Alexander, Fabian Varesi | Morgoth | 3:42 |
| 10. | "Enthrone the Dark Angel" (Version 2002) | Alexander | Alexander, Fabian Varesi | Morgoth | 3:17 |
| Total length: | | | | | 42:02 |

== Personnel ==
- Alexander − vocals
- Fabian − keyboards, samples, backing vocals and orchestral arrangements
- Alex − lead guitar
- Robert − rhythm guitar, extra guitar arrangements
- Zimon − bass
- Scarlet − backing vocals
- Justine − backing vocals
- Nick A. − drums (session)

=== Guest members ===
- Maestro Dimitri - strings
- Maestro Mc Bor - orchestral arrangements
