= Aurea (given name) =

Aurea is a Latin female name meaning "golden".

Notable people and birds with the name include:

- Auria, queen of Pamplona in the 10th century
- Aurea (singer) (born 1987), Portuguese soul singer
- Aurea of Ostia, a 3rd-century Italian martyr
- Áurea Cruz (born 1982), Puerto Rican volleyball player
- Áurea of San Millán (1043–1070), Spanish saint
- Aurea, Auburn University golden eagle, flies in the stadium before football games
