= Candyland (Theatres des Vampires album) =

Studio album by Theatres des Vampires
- Released: 14 October 2016
- Genre: Gothic metal
- Length: 39:58
- Label: Scarlet Records
- Producer: Christian Ice

Theatres des Vampires chronology
Moonlight Waltz (2011)	Candyland (2016)	In Nomine Sanguinis (2021)

Professional ratings
Review scores
Source	Rating
New Noise Magazine	3/5
Metal.de	4/10
Metalitalia.com	7.0/10

Candyland is the tenth studio album by Italian gothic metal band Theatres des Vampires, released through Scarlet Records on 14 October 2016. Initially announced on 7 July 2016, it is their first studio album in 5 years since Moonlight Waltz, and also their first release with guitarist Giorgio Ferrante, who replaced Stephan Benfante early in 2016. It is noticeably more guitar-driven than the band's previous releases with Sonya Scarlet on vocals, and its lyrics focus less on the vampiric and occult themes the band is famous for. A music video for the track "Morgana Effect" was uploaded to the band's official YouTube channel on 29 September 2016.

The album counts with guest appearances by Moonspell vocalist Fernando Ribeiro and J.T.R. Sickert frontman Tiziano Panini (a.k.a. Billy T. Cooper), Scarlet's husband.

== Track listing ==
All lyrics are written by Sonya Scarlet (except for "Photographic" by Vince Clarke); all music is composed by Scarlet and Christian Ice.

No.	Title	Length
1.	"Morgana Effect"	3:42
2.	"Resurrection Mary"	4:15
3.	"Delusional Denial" (feat. Billy T. Cooper)	3:09
4.	"Parasomnia"	4:09
5.	"Candyland"	4:03
6.	"Your Ragdoll"	3:21
7.	"Pierrot Lunaire"	3:16
8.	"Photographic" (Depeche Mode cover)	3:35
9.	"Opium Shades"	3:28
10.	"Seventh Room" (feat. Fernando Ribeiro)	3:25
11.	"Autumn Leaves"	3:35
Total length:		39:58

== Critical reception ==
The album has received mostly positive reviews since its release. Writing for New Noise Magazine, Grim Lord gave it 3 out of 5 stars, comparing its sonority favorably to Lacuna Coil, Theatre of Tragedy, The Dreamside and "the gothic metal/rock of [his] younger days". However, he also stated that "[he] didn't find Scarlet's vocal approach to be to [his] taste in most songs" ("Pierrot Lunaire" excepted, which he thought of as "one of the disc's main standouts"), and commented on the lack of "occult-/Lilith-/Lucifer-style lyrics" as being "a kind of a drag". Metal.de gave a negative review, only tracks they liked were "Parasomnia" and "Photographic". Vampster called the album toothless and said the music lacks drama and depth. The tracks "Candyland" and "Opium Shades" were noted as insignificant. Metalitalia.com gave a positive review, praising the lyrics and the singer's versatility.

== Personnel ==
- Sonya Scarlet – vocals
- Zimon Lijoi – bass guitar
- Gabriel Valerio – drums
- Giorgio Ferrante – guitar
- Fernando Ribeiro – vocals (track 10)
- Billy T. Cooper (Tiziano Panini) – vocals (track 3)
- Francesco Sosto – keyboards, arrangements (track 7)
- Luca Bellanova – keyboards, arrangements (track 11)
- Elisa Pezzuto – backing vocals
- Christian Ice – production, mixing, mastering
- Daniele Pompei, Luca Cavallari – photography
