= Vampyrìsme... =

Studio album by Theatres des Vampires
- Released: September 15, 2003
- Genre: Gothic metal; melodic black metal
- Length: 42:15
- Label: Beyond... Productions
- Producer: Alessandro Nunziati

Theatres des Vampires chronology
| Suicide Vampire (2002) | Vampyrìsme... (2003) | Nightbreed of Macabria (2004) |

Professional ratings
Review scores
| Source | Rating |
|---|---|
| Desibeli.net | 1.5/5 |
| Metalitalia.com | 6.5/10 |
| Noise.fi | 2/5 |

Vampyrìsme... is the fifth studio album by Italian band Theatres des Vampires, released on September 15, 2003 by Beyond... Productions. It is a re-recorded version of the band's 1996 debut album Vampyrìsme, Nècrophilie, Nècrosadisme, Nècrophagie. The album was re-recorded entirely by Theatres des Vampires with guest appearances from former Cradle of Filth guitarist Gian Pyres and Christian Death vocalist Valor Kand. The album has also four new bonus tracks.

"Kingdom of Vampires" is a re-recording of the eponymous song present in Theatres des Vampires' 1995 demo Nosferatu, eine Simphonie des Gravens.

== Critical reception ==
Desibeli.net called the production poor and said the bonus tracks are better than the tracks on the main album. Noise.fi also didn't like the production and said there are lack of hooks in the songs. Metalitalia.com said the album is enjoyable but mainly intended for die-hard fans.

== Track listing ==
| No. | Title | Length |
|---|---|---|
| 1. | "Vampyrìsme..." | 1:54 |
| 2. | "Twilight" | 3:46 |
| 3. | "Beyond the Forest" | 3:44 |
| 4. | "In the Wood" | 4:39 |
| 5. | "Ancient Damned" | 4:17 |
| 6. | "Woods of Walacchia, Part I" | 6:17 |
| 7. | "The Dark Domain" | 5:12 |
| 8. | "Walpurga's Night" | 3:19 |
| 9. | "The Snow Turns Red" | 3:33 |
| 10. | "The Impaler" | 5:34 |

Bonus tracks
| No. | Title | Length |
|---|---|---|
| 11. | "Kingdom of Vampires" | 4:01 |
| 12. | "The Enchanted Forest" | 2:52 |
| 13. | "Lucretia" | 4:16 |
| 14. | "Lacrima Christi" (Christian Death cover; feat. Valor Kand) | 6:10 |

== Personnel ==
- Lord Vampyr (Alessandro Nunziati) – lead vocals
- Gabriel Valerio – drums, backing vocals
- Alessandro Pallotta – guitars
- Zimon Lijoi – bass
- Fabian Varesi – keyboards, backing vocals, musical arrangements
- Sonya Scarlet – female backing vocals
- Count Morgoth (Roberto Cufaro) – guitars
- Roberto Grasso – backing vocals
- Gian Pyres (Gianpiero Piras) – guitars (on track 12)
- Valor Kand – backing vocals (on track 14)
