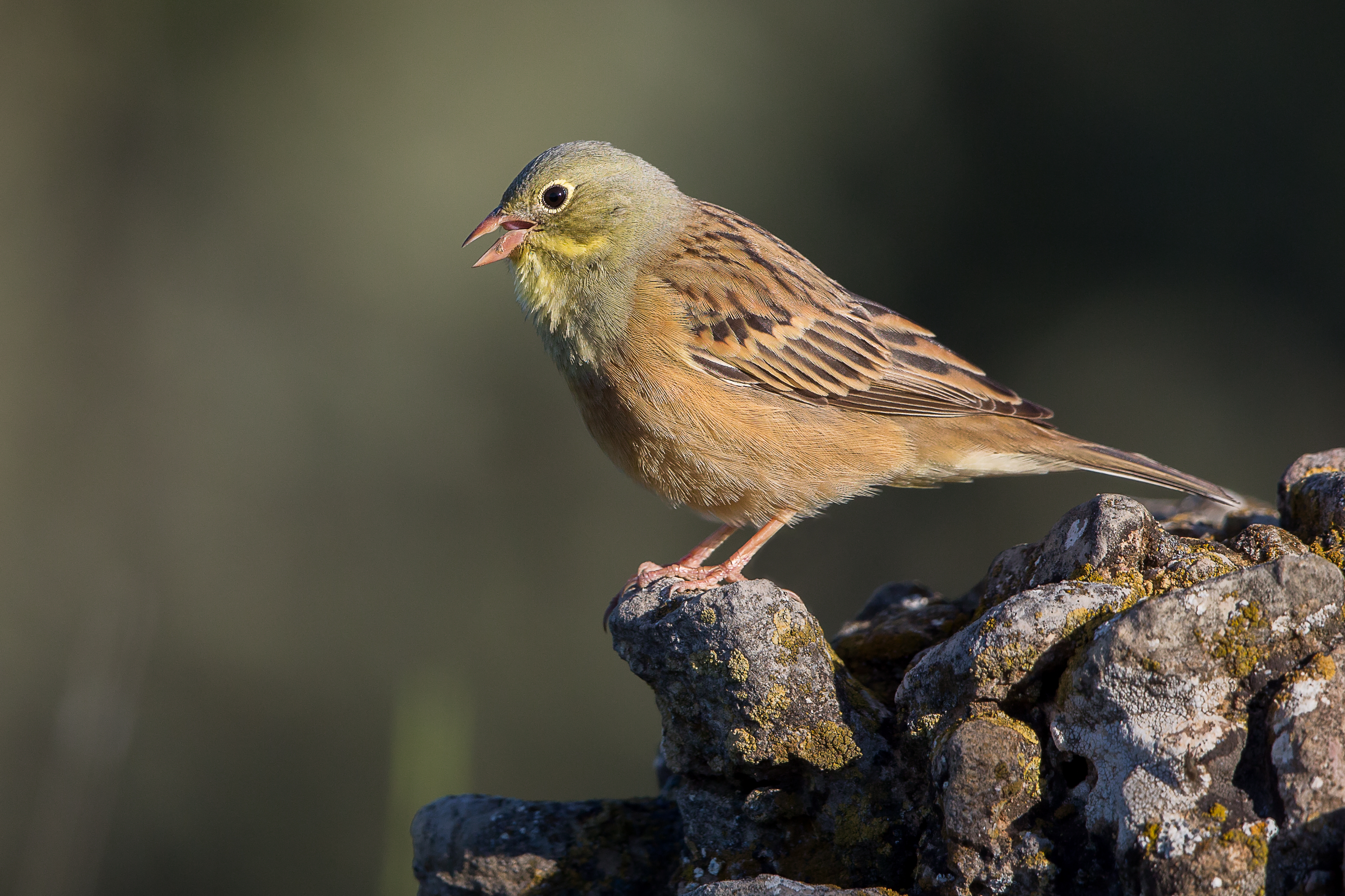

Conservation status
- Least Concern (IUCN 3.1)

Scientific classification
- Kingdom: Animalia
- Phylum: Chordata
- Class: Aves
- Order: Passeriformes
- Family: Emberizidae
- Genus: Emberiza
- Species: E. hortulana

Binomial name
- Emberiza hortulana Linnaeus, 1758
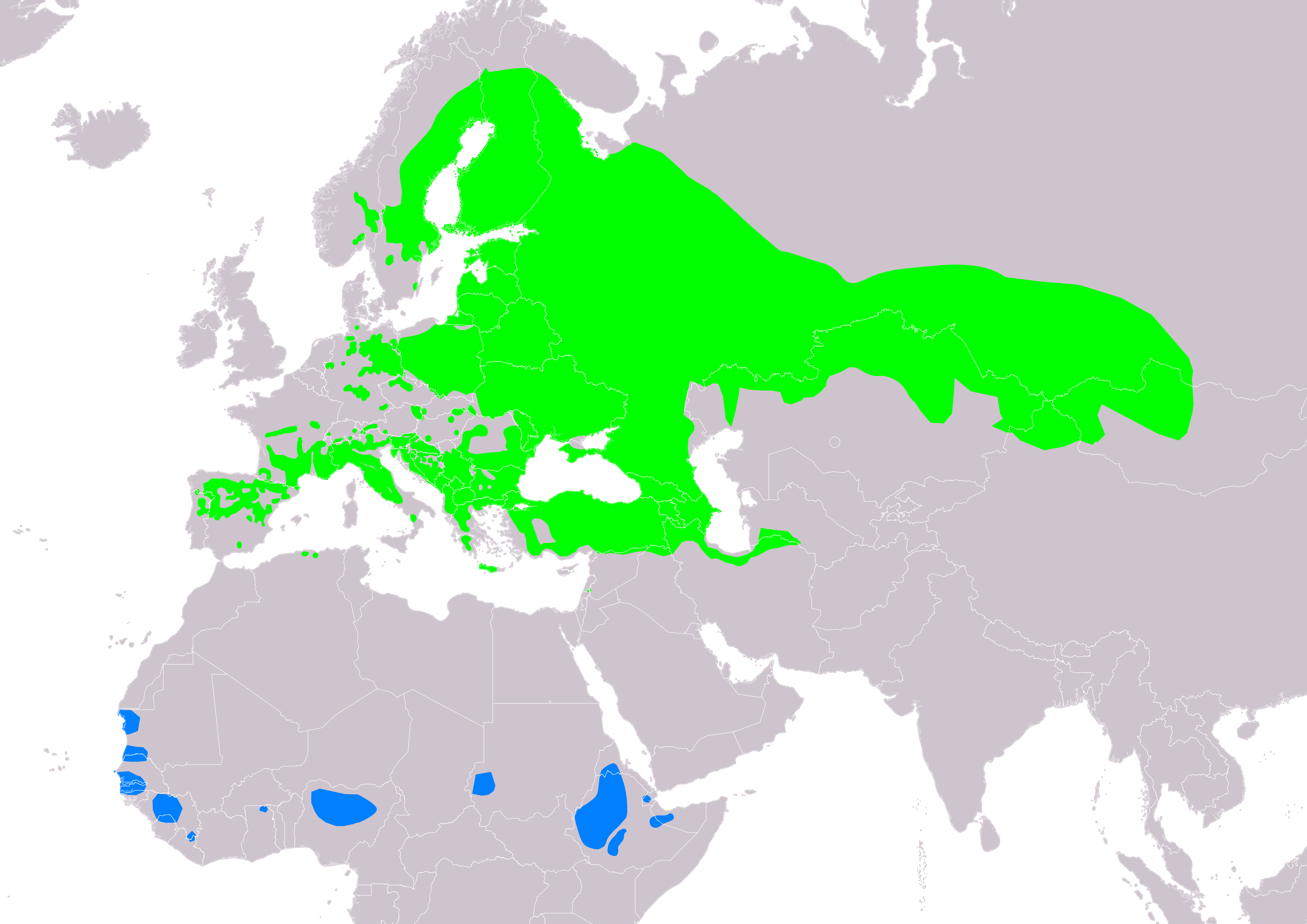
- Range of E. hortulana Breeding Non-breeding

= Ortolan bunting =

Species of bird in Eurasia

The ortolan (Emberiza hortulana), also called ortolan bunting, is a Eurasian bird in the bunting family Emberizidae, a passerine family now separated by most modern scholars from the finches, Fringillidae. The genus name Emberiza is from Alemannic German Embritz, a bunting. The specific name hortulana is from the Italian name for this bird, ortolana. The English ortolan is derived from Middle French hortolan, "gardener".

The ortolan is served in French cuisine, typically cooked and eaten whole. Traditionally, diners cover their heads with their napkins or a towel while eating the delicacy. The ortolan was so widely eaten that its French populations had dropped dangerously low by the 1990s. French laws protecting the bird, and an EU-wide prohibition against killing or capturing it, have had little effect on the ortolan's numbers.

== Taxonomy ==
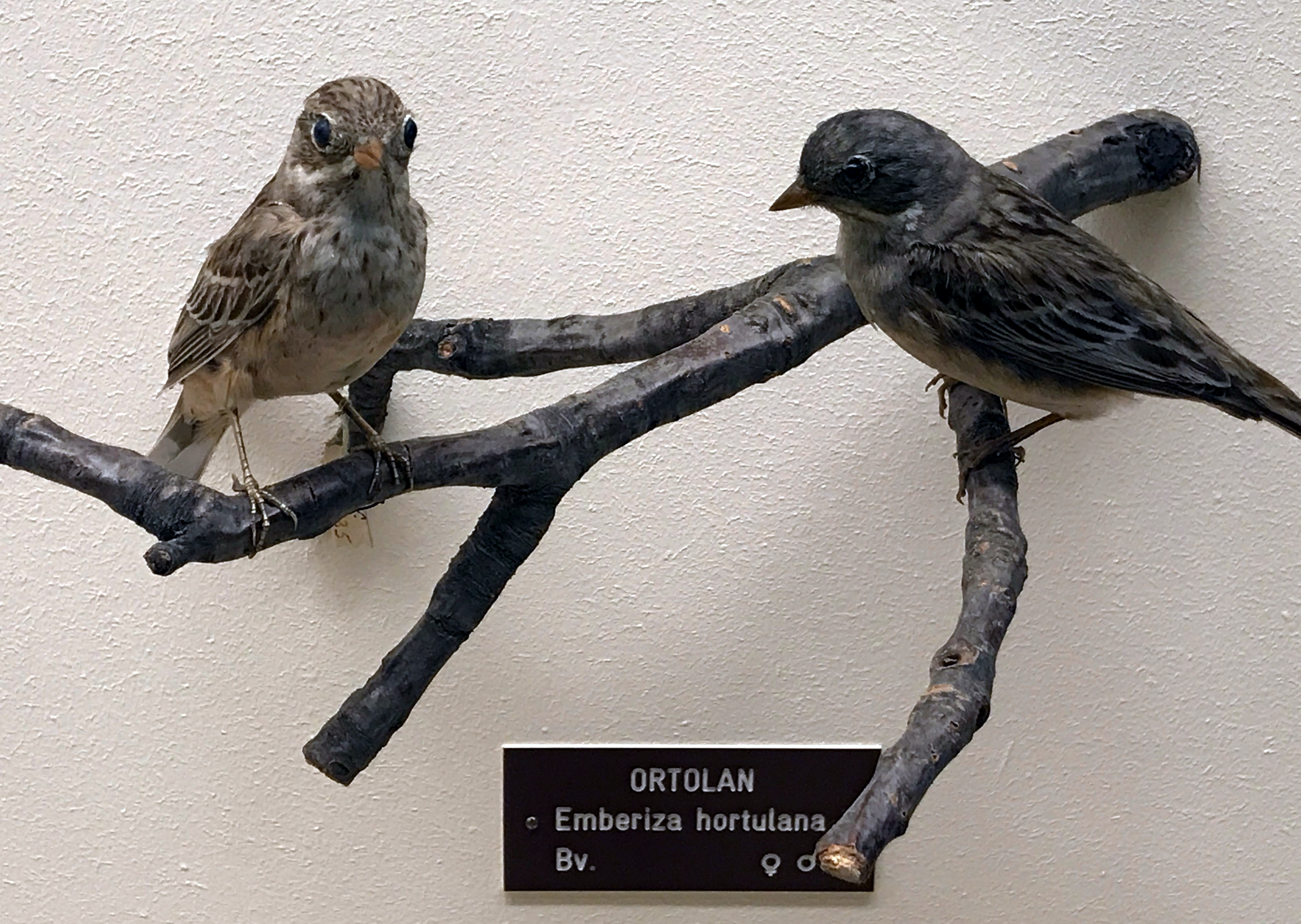
Ortolan bunting bird mount preparation

The ortolan bunting was described by the Swedish naturalist Carl Linnaeus in 1758 in the tenth edition of his Systema Naturae and retains its original binomial name of Emberiza hortulana. The species is monotypic. A molecular phylogenetic study of the buntings published in 2008 found that the ortolan bunting is most closely related to Cretzschmar's bunting (Emberiza caesia).

== Description ==
Ortolan bunting

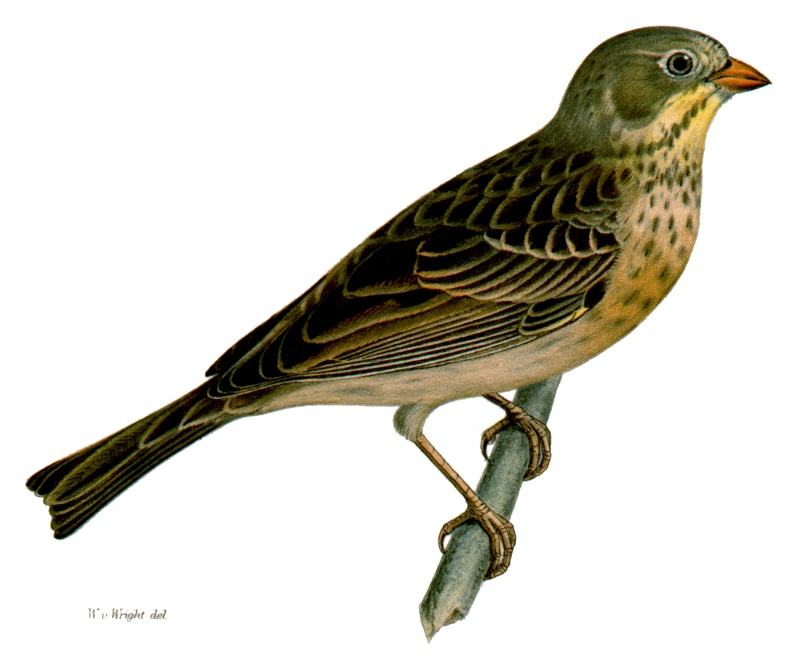
Female

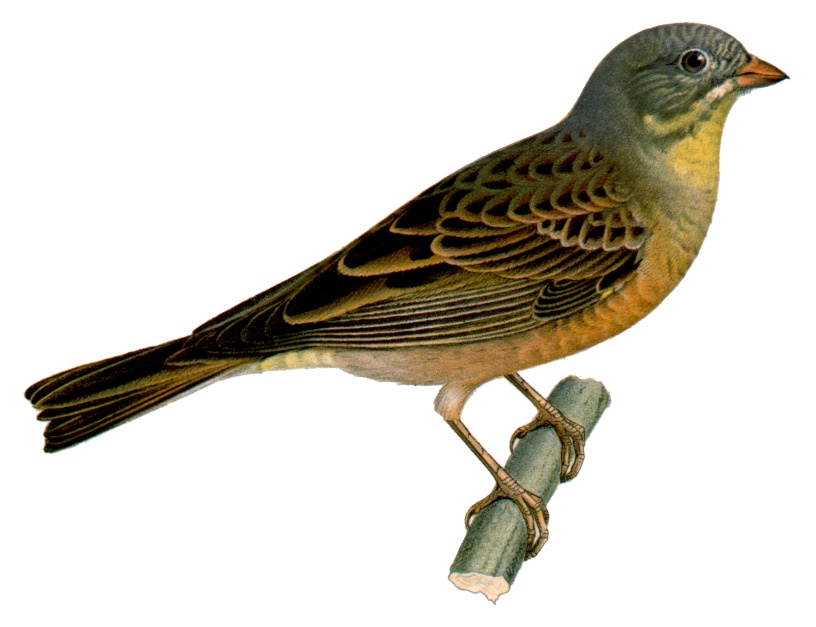
Male

The ortolan bunting is 16–17 centimetres (6 1/4–6 3/4 inches) in length and has a wing-span of 23–29 cm (9–11 1/2 in). In appearance and habits it much resembles its relative the yellowhammer, but lacks the bright colouring of that species; the ortolan's head, for instance, is greenish-grey, instead of a bright yellow. The song of the male ortolan resembles that of the yellowhammer.

== Distribution and habitat ==
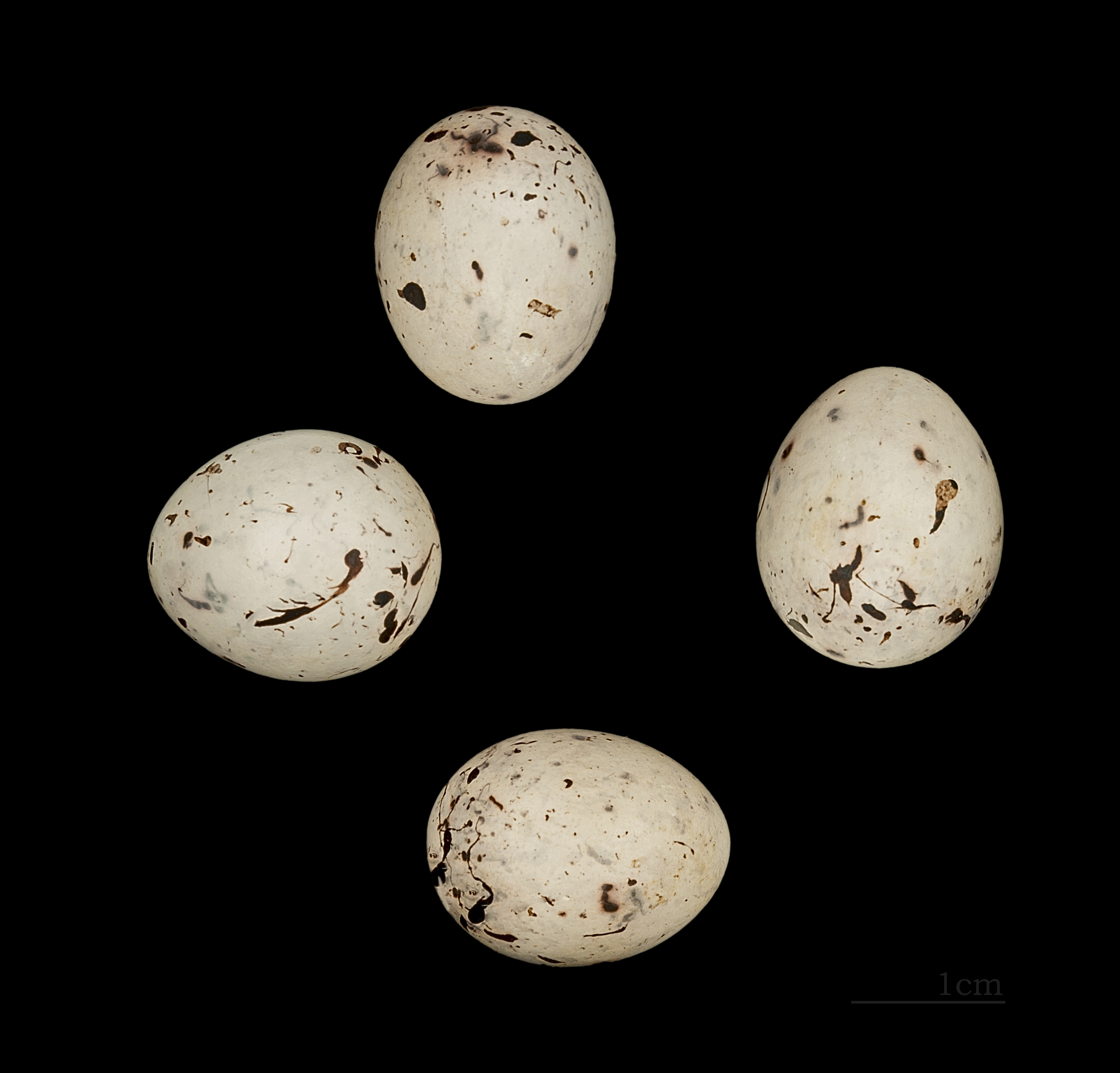
Ortolan eggs

A native of most European countries and West Asia, it reaches as far north as Scandinavia and beyond the Arctic Circle, frequenting cornfields and their neighbourhoods. It is an uncommon vagrant in spring, and particularly autumn, to the British Isles. Sightings in the UK are less common than they were, owing to the species' population decline due to overexploitation in France.

It was spotted at Kenjar Coastal Karnataka, India, in November 2018 and photographed by birdwatchers. Some birders commented that it is the first photographic record of an ortolan bunting in India.

== Behaviour ==
Ortolan nests are placed on or near the ground.

The maximum age recorded is six years and ten months for a bird found dead in Switzerland.

Seeds are the natural diet, but beetles and other insects are taken when feeding their young.

== Culinary use ==
For centuries, a rite of passage for French gourmets was the eating of the Ortolan. These tiny birds—captured alive, force-fed, then drowned in Armagnac—were roasted whole and eaten that way, bones and all, while the diner draped his head with a linen napkin to preserve the precious aromas and, some believe, to hide from God.

— The Wine Spectator

The birds are caught with nets set during their autumn migratory flight to Africa. They are then kept in covered cages or boxes, where they are force-fed grain, usually millet seed. Once they have doubled in bulk, they are suspended upside down over a container of Armagnac, and by dipping, are drowned before being marinated in the brandy.

The birds are then plucked, salted and peppered and cooked in their own fat for seven minutes. Many consumers place the bird feet first into their mouth while holding onto the bird's head, eating the ortolan whole, with or without the head. Some spit out the larger bones, while others eat the whole bird head, bones and all. The traditional way French gourmands eat ortolans is to cover their heads and face with a large napkin or towel while consuming the bird. The purpose of the towel is debated. Some claim it is to retain the maximum aroma with the flavour as they consume the entire bird at once, while according to The Daily Telegraph, "Tradition dictates that [the towel] is to shield – from God's eyes – the shame of such a decadent and disgraceful act", and others have suggested the towel simply hides the consumers spitting out bones. This use of the towel was begun by a priest, a friend of Jean Anthelme Brillat-Savarin.

At one time, the island of Cyprus formed a chief depot for the export of ortolans, which were pickled in spices and vinegar and packed in casks containing from 300 to 400 each. In the early 20th century, between 400 and 500 casks were annually exported from Cyprus.

=== Noted meals ===
- Edgar Allan Poe references eating ortolans in his short story The Duc de L'Omelette, first published in 1832, in which the Duke dies while dining on an ortolan and finds himself in hell. The ortolan is brought from Peru in a golden cage as a gift from ‘its queenly possessor, La Bellissima.’ He plays a game of cards in Hell with the Devil, Baal-Zebub, Prince of the Fly, with the promise that if he wins, he will be allowed to go back to his ortolans.
- The Three Emperors Dinner in 1867 included ortolans on toast among its 16 courses.
- The favourite dish of medicine Nobel laureate and inventor of the lobotomy procedure, António Egas Moniz, was ortolans as prepared at the restaurant Le Chapon Fin in Bordeaux.
- In the 1958 film Gigi, which begins in the year 1900, Gigi's aunt instructs her in gourmet dining, including one particular scene of the consumption of ortolans.
- In 1975, food critic Craig Claiborne made a winning $300 bid in an auction for a dinner for two, courtesy of American Express, at any restaurant in the world that takes its credit card. Claiborne selected Chez Denis in Paris for a $4,000 meal ($20,665 in 2022) that included a course of ortolans.
- In 1995, former French President François Mitterrand's last New Year's Eve meal included this specially prepared bird.
- In the Succession episode "Which Side Are You On?", Tom Wambsgans invites Cousin Greg, who has already eaten a meal, to enjoy a deep-fried ortolan at an "exclusive pop-up" in New York, saying "it's kind of illegal", and, of the towel, "Its exact purpose is debated. Some say it's to mask the shame, others, to enhance the flavor."
- In the Get Jiro S1E3 episode "The Ortolan", the meal is a central plot point in what is later referred to as The Ortolan Massacre.

== Legal status ==
Ortolan hunting was banned in France in 1999, but the law was poorly enforced and it is thought that up to 50,000 ortolans were illegally killed each year during the autumn migration: mostly birds from breeding grounds in Finland and the Baltic area. According to France's League for the Protection of Birds, France's ortolan population fell 30% between 1997 and 2007. In 2007, the French government vowed to strictly enforce some existing rules about banning the practice, with the maximum fine set at €6,000. Killing and cooking ortolans is banned across the European Union. In 2007, the pressure from France's League for Protection of Birds and from the EU resulted in the French government promising to enforce the EU directive protecting the ortolan. After several years of active citizen watch revealing little if any change in the field situation, the local representative of the government repeated this statement in 2016.

EU member states prohibit:

- deliberate killing or capture of these birds by any method;
- deliberate destruction of, or damage to, their nests and eggs or removal of their nests;
- taking their eggs in the wild and keeping these eggs;
- deliberate disturbance of these birds particularly during the period of breeding and rearing, insofar as this would have a significant negative effect on the birds;
- keeping birds, the hunting and capture of which is prohibited;
- sale, transport for sale, keeping for sale and the offering for sale of live or dead birds and of any readily recognizable parts or derivatives of these birds.

As of 2018, the overall ortolan bunting's population is listed by the IUCN as Least Concern (LC). However, a 2019 study using stable isotopes, archival light geologgers, and population genetics suggests the species is in decline.

== See also ==
- Ambelopoulia
- Animal rights
- Animal welfare
- Cruelty to animals
- French cuisine
- Occitan cuisine
