= Cain (Italian band) =

Italian black/thrash metal band

- Origin: Rome, Italy
- Genres: Black metal, thrash metal
- Years active: 2005–present
- Label: Vampyria Records
- Members: Lord Alexander; Aeternus; Seth 666; Francesco Bucci
- Past members: Nighthorn; S.K.

Cain is an Italian black/thrash metal band formed and based in Rome. In 2007, their first studio album, Triumvira, was released through Vampyria Records. It was well received by the critics; Italian webzine TrueMetal.it awarded it a 79 out of 100. Metalitalia.it gave it a score of 6 out of 10. However, the band entered a long hiatus after the album's release, and were allegedly looking for a new record label during this period.

On 1 December 2014, Nunziati announced on his official Facebook page that Cain would be returning to active after a 7-year hiatus, and on 4 December, he stated that Francesco Bucci, famous for being the bassist of symphonic black metal band Stormlord, would be joining Cain.

== Discography ==
- 2005: Dioscuri Aurea Sæcula (demo)
- 2007: Triumvira

== Band members ==
=== Current members ===
- Lord Alexander (Alessandro Nunziati) – guitars, vocals (2005–present)

=== Past members ===
- Nighthorn (Silvano Leone) – bass (2005–2014)
- S.K. – drums (2005–2014)
