= Asterius of Ostia =

3rd-century Christian priest and martyr

Saint Asterius

Martyr
- Died: ~222; Rome
- Venerated in: Roman Catholic Church
- Canonized: Pre-congregation
- Major shrine: Cathedral of Santa Aurea, Ostia, Italy
- Feast: 21 October

Asterius of Ostia (d. 3rd century AD) was a martyred priest venerated as a saint in the Catholic Church. Information on him is based on the apocryphal Acts of Saint Callixtus.

== Life ==
According to tradition, he was a priest of Rome who recovered the body of Pope Callixtus I after it had been dumped into a well around 222 AD. Asterius buried Callixtus' body at night, but was arrested for this by the prefect Alexander, and executed by being thrown off a bridge into the Tiber River. His body washed up at Ostia and was buried there.

== Veneration ==
Asterius was venerated from at least the 4th or 5th centuries. The relics of a saint with the same name, along with those of his daughter, were translated by Pope Sergius II between 844 and 847 and are enshrined in the Church of San Martino ai Monti on the Esquiline, according to Anastasius the Librarian. However, the "Bollandists think that this is the body of another Asterius."
