= Frank Coburn =

American painter

- Born: July 4, 1862; Chicago, Illinois
- Died: November 13, 1938 (aged 75–76); Santa Ana, California
- Occupation: Painter

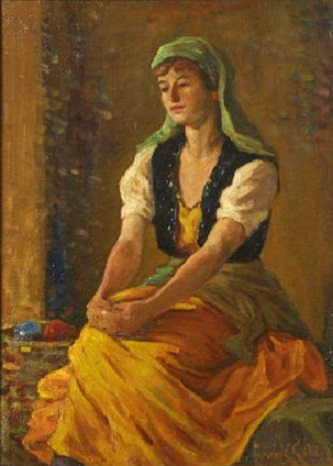
Portrait of Mary McIvor by Frank Coburn

Frank Coburn (July 4, 1862 – November 13, 1938) was an American painter. His work is associated with early 20th-century Californian art and the American Impressionism movement.

He is best known for painting landscapes of Southern California, though Coburn's work also includes still lifes, portraits, figure studies, and urban scenes. His work is notable for its diversity, including portraits of Native Americans, including Laguna Pueblo and Huichol people.

== Biography ==
Coburn was born in 1862 and grew up in Chicago, Illinois. His mother was Theresa Southwick. He was educated at the Art Institute of Chicago, though he reportedly considered himself to have been largely self-taught. He moved to California in 1909 and much of his work was shaped by that landscape and artistic culture, especially the greater area of Santa Ana and Los Angeles. He often traveled around California in his bus-like vehicle called "El Vagabundo," which also acted as his studio.

He was married to Luella Elliot, though little is known about this, or other relationships Coburn had with friends, family, or other artists.

Important for his career was a solo exhibition held at the Bowers Museum in Santa Ana, California, in 1938, the year he died. He was survived by his sister, Georgia DeLong, who donated several paintings to the Bowers Museum.
