= Santa Aurea =

Church building in Rome, Italy

Santa Aurea Basilica di Sant'Aurea (in Italian) Basilica Sanctae Aureae (in Latin)
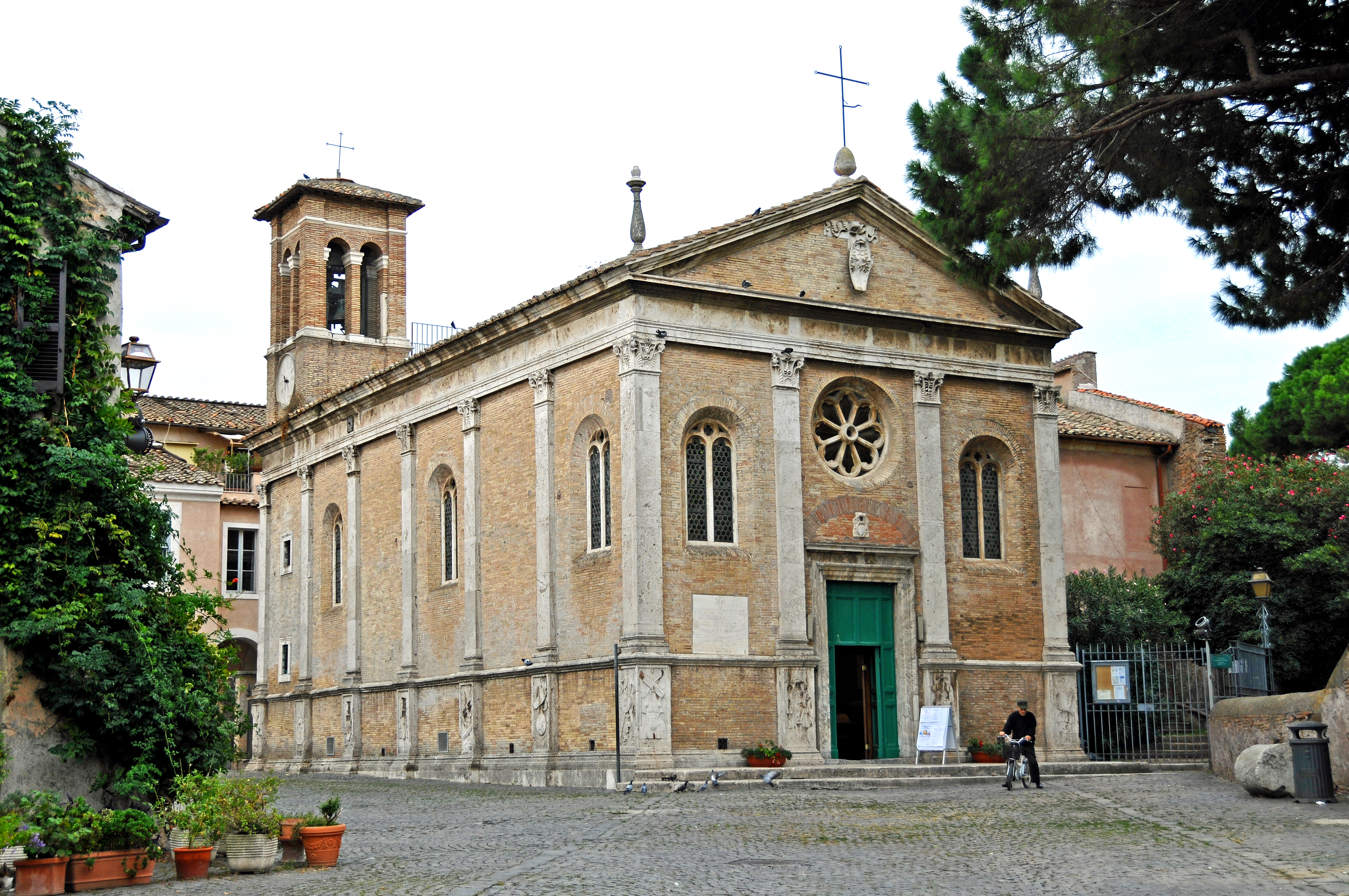

- Location within Lazio

Religion
- Affiliation: Roman Catholic
- Province: Suburbicarian Diocese of Ostia
- Rite: Latin
- Ecclesiastical or organisational status: Titular church, basilica, cathedral
- Patron: Saint Aurea of Ostia

Location
- Location: Ostia Antica, Rome, Italy
- Coordinates: 41.759349°N 12.30185°E

Architecture
- Architect: Baccio Pontelli
- Type: Church
- Style: Renaissance
- Groundbreaking: 3rd century AD?
- Completed: end of the 15th century (present building)

Specifications
- Direction of façade: West
- Height (max): 12 metres (39 ft)

Website
- santaurea.org

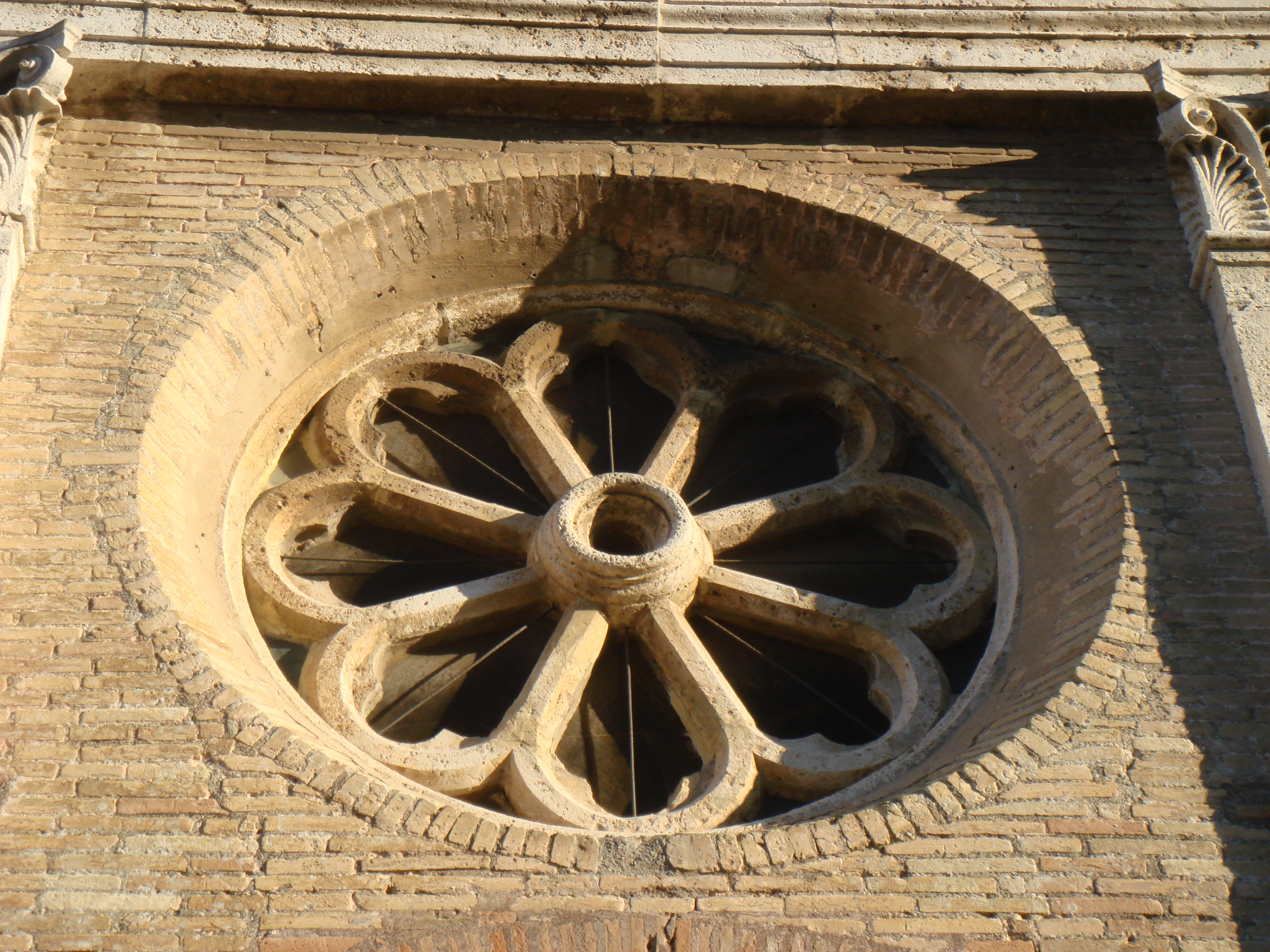
Rose window

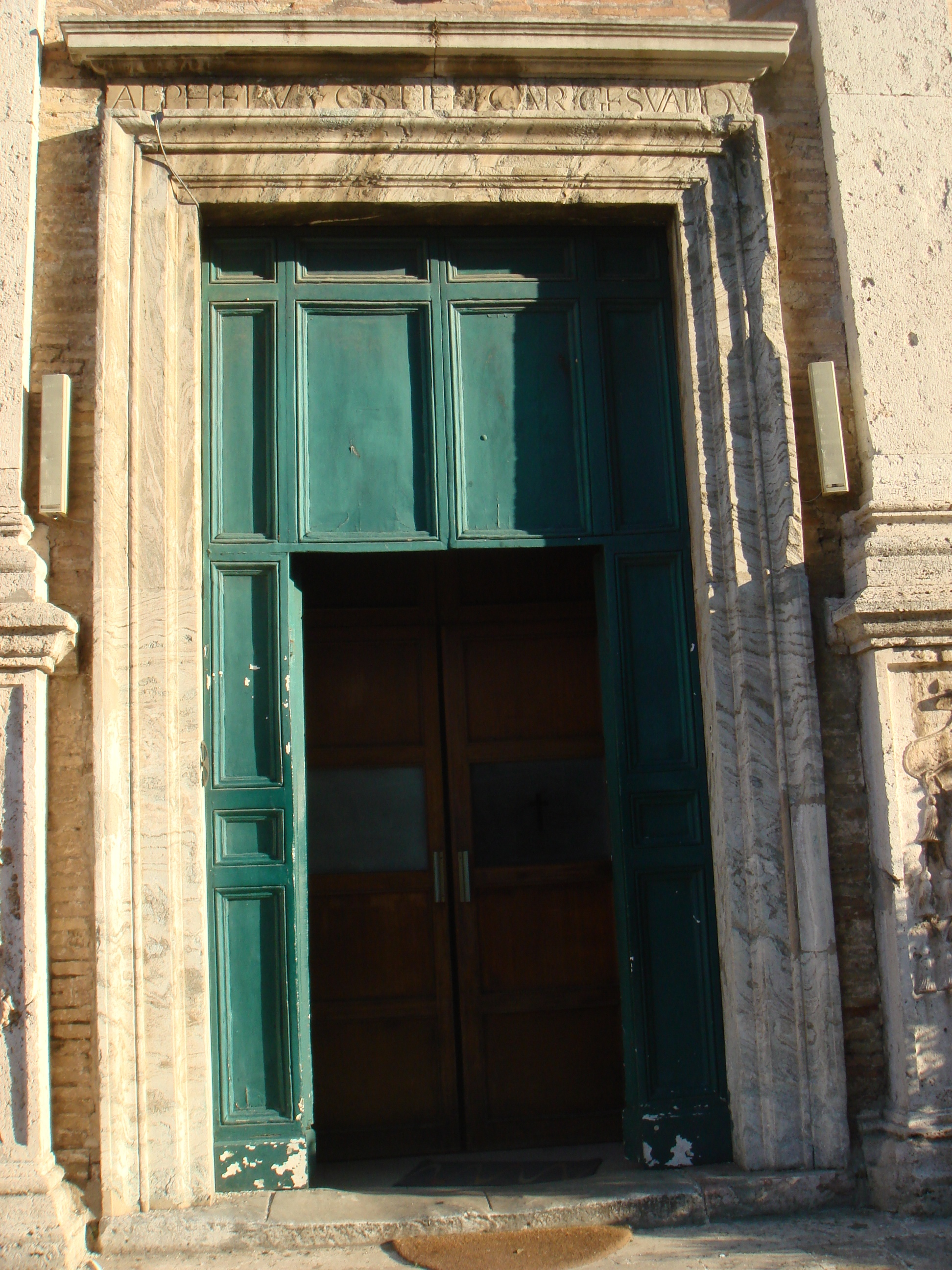
Main door. The inscription reads in Latin, ALPH EPVS OSTIEN CARD GESVALDVS, "Alfonso, Bishop of Ostia, Cardinal Gesualdo," referring to Alfonso Gesualdo, incumbent in 1591–1603.

The Basilica of Santa Aurea is a church situated in the Ostia Antica district of Ostia, Italy. Ostia became an episcopal see as early as the 3rd century AD. The present-day church, completed in 1483, is the cathedral of the suburbicarian diocese of Ostia.

== History ==
The church was built at the end of the 15th century by order of the French cardinal Guillaume d'Estouteville, and was completed by Cardinal Giuliano della Rovere (the future Pope Julius II). The actual construction was entrusted to Baccio Pontelli, who had also built the neighboring fortress.

It is uncertain whether the church was built over a pre-existing Paleochristian church, but according to tradition, the patron saint of Ostia, the martyr Saint Aurea, was buried near the present-day location of the church. According to tradition, the relics of Saint Monica, mother of Augustine of Hippo, rested at this early church of Santa Aurea before being translated to Rome to the church of San Trifone in Posterula and finally to the Basilica di Sant'Agostino. The relics of St. Asterius of Ostia are enshrined at Santa Aurea.

== Description ==
The inside of the basilica contains a single nave, and the church is illuminated by a rose window and double lancet windows dating from the 15th century. The church contains a chapel dedicated to Saint Monica, which contains a sepulchral stone re-discovered in the summer of 1945 that contains a funerary epigraph written by Anicius Bassus. The fragment was discovered after two boys were digging a hole to plant a football post in the courtyard beside Santa Aurea.

The chapel contains a painting by Pietro da Cortona called the Ecstasy of Saint Monica (Estasi di santa Monica). The apse is dedicated with frescoes of the 16th century. The basilica, center of a parish dating from the Paleochristian age, has been a titulus since the 12th century.

== Sources ==
- C. Rendina, Le Chiese di Roma, Newton & Compton Editori, Milano 2000, 41
- AA.VV., Il borgo di Ostia da Sisto IV a Giulio II. in "Il ’400 a Roma e nel Lazio", Roma, 1981
- M. Floriani Squarciapino, Considerazioni su Ostia cristiana, in "Studi romani" 27 (1979) 15-24.
