= Legenda Aurea (band) =

Swiss heavy metal band

- Origin: Zürich, Switzerland
- Genres: Heavy metal; gothic metal; power metal; symphonic metal
- Years active: 2005–2016
- Labels: Mindstorm, Twilight Zone
- Past members: Simone; Odi; Herki; Renato; Philipp; Claudia; Martin

Legenda Aurea was a Swiss heavy metal band from Zürich, where they were formed in 2005, while they play a style of gothic metal, power metal, and symphonic metal music.

== Background ==
They formed during 2005 in Zürich, Switzerland, where they are vocalist, Simone Christinat, guitarist, Odilo, bassist, Herki, keyboardist, Renato, and drummer, Philipp. Their former vocalist was Claudia Hofer, while their founding drummer was Martin Roth.

== Music history ==
The group have released three albums. Their first studio album, Sedna, was released on 26 January 2007, by Mindstorm Records. They released, Ellipsis, on 6 March 2009, with Twilight Zone Records. The third and final studio album, Aeon, was released independently on 12 February 2016.

== Band members ==
Last known lineup

- Simone – vocals
- Odi – guitar
- Herki – bass
- Renato – keys
- Philipp – drums

Former members

- Claudia – vocals
- Martin – drums

== Discography ==
Studio albums:

- Sedna (2007)
- Ellipsis (2009)
- Aeon (2016)
