= Ulmus americana 'Aurea' =

Elm cultivar

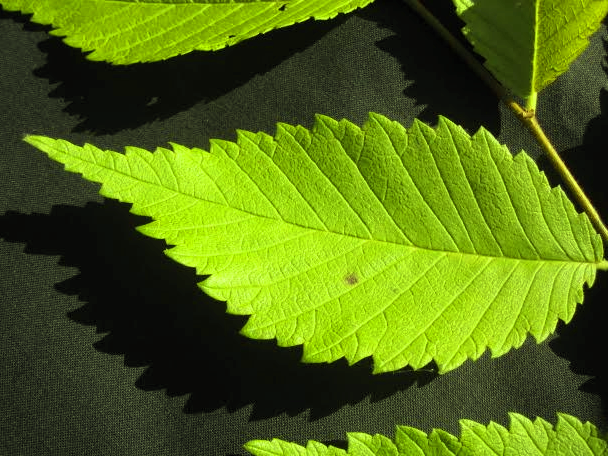
- Species: Ulmus americana
- Cultivar: 'Aurea'
- Origin: Vermont, US

The American elm cultivar Ulmus americana 'Aurea' was cloned from a tree discovered by F. L. Temple in Vermont at the end of the 19th century.

== Description ==
The tree was described simply as having yellow foliage.

== Pests and diseases ==
No specific information available, but the species as a whole is highly susceptible to Dutch elm disease and elm yellows; it is also moderately preferred for feeding and reproduction by the adult elm leaf beetle Xanthogaleruca luteola, and highly preferred for feeding by the Japanese beetle Popillia japonica in the United States. U. americana is also the most susceptible of all the elms to verticillium wilt.

== Cultivation ==
Young trees are grown in Belgium and London, cloned from a tree (now dead) which grew in Illinois.

== Synonymy ==
- Ulmus americana var. aurea Temple, F. L. ex Rehder , in Bailey: Cycl. Amer. Hort. (4): 1880.
