= Aureus (disambiguation) =

Aureus, golden in Latin, may refer to:

- Aureus, a gold coin of ancient Rome valued at 25 silver denarii
- Aureus (saint), 5th century German saint
- Vitulus Aureus (the golden calf), a book by Dutch alchemist Johann Friedrich Schweitze
- a jewellery brand owned by F. Hinds
- Staphylococcus aureus, a Gram-positive spherically shaped bacterium

== See also ==
- Aurea (disambiguation)
