= Theatres des Vampires =

Italian gothic metal band

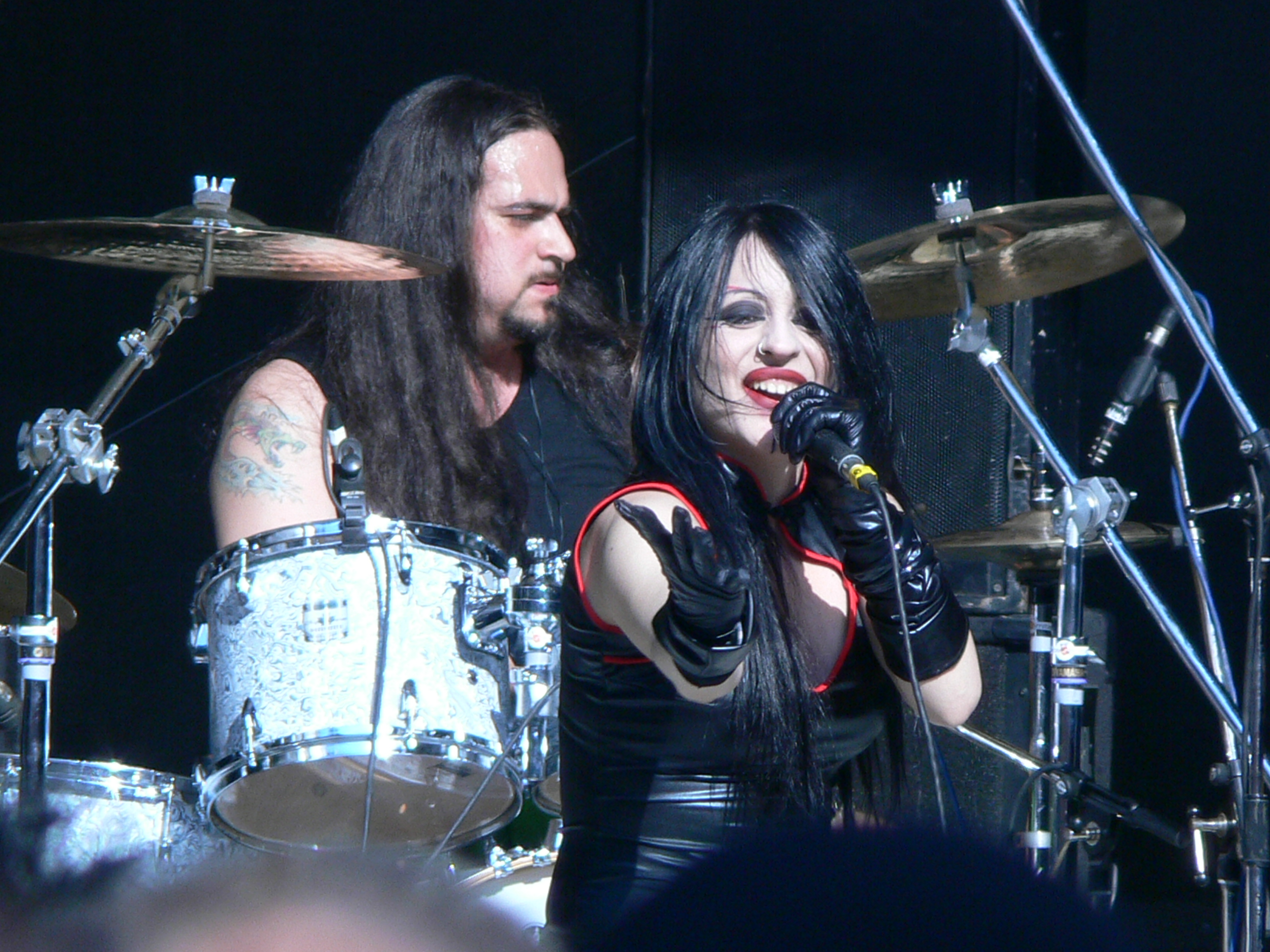
- Performing in 2006

Background information
- Origin: Rome, Italy
- Genres: Gothic metal; symphonic black metal (early)
- Years active: 1994–present
- Labels: Scarlet; Aural Music; Dreamcell; Plastic Head; Blackend; Garden of Grief
- Members: Gabriel Valerio; Zimon Lijoi; Sonya Scarlet; Flavio Gianello; Fabian Varesi
- Past members: Alessandro Nunziati; Robert Cufaro; Enrico de Dominicis; Karlenstein; Justine Consuelo; Alessandro Pallotta; Strigoi; Mortifer; Stephan Benfante; Giorgio Ferrante

Theatres des Vampires is an Italian gothic metal band, mostly noted for the predominant theme of vampirism within their lyrics. The band's early material was credited as melodic black metal or symphonic black metal, but the group completely abandoned all black metal influence by the mid-2000s. Theatres des Vampires have released eleven full-length albums.

== History and background ==
Theatres des Vampires was formed in 1994 by Alessandro "Lord Vampyr" Nunziati, after leaving VII Arcano due to stylistic differences. Their name is based on the all vampire-based theatre coven from the 1976 novel Interview with the Vampire. Problems with the initial Theatres des Vampires line-up meant that the first full-length studio album, Vampyrìsme, Nècrophilie, Nècrosadisme, Nècrophagie (1996) was recorded single-handedly by Nunziati.

By 1999 the band had a stable line-up, and recorded The Vampire Chronicles, the promotion for which saw Theatres des Vampires employing movie effects to create spectacular live shows. The band's members expressed a fascination with vampires and anything connected to them, earning themselves and their music the title "vampiric metal" from their contemporaries. The band created an image of vampirism in their stage performance and within the lyrical themes and atmospheres of their music, which contributed heavily to the gaining of their fanbase. The Vampire Chronicles is the name of Anne Rice's Interview with the Vampire series.

The third album Bloody Lunatic Asylum, was released in 2001 with live work including dates with Iron Maiden, Children of Bodom and In Flames amongst others.

The band has produced several albums with the English label Plastic Head, and has gained more recognition within the metal scene in Europe, South America and Russia, partially because of the band's participation in various festivals around the world. These include Vampyria III in London in 1999, Gods of Metal in Italy in 2000, Wave-Gotik-Treffen in Leipzig in 2003 and 2006, Gotham in London in 2004, and Female Voices Festival in Wieze, Belgium in 2006.

In 2003, the band toured with Christian Death throughout Europe, and recorded an album with Valor of Christian Death and Gian Pyres of Cradle of Filth as special guests.

Since 2004, Sonya Scarlet has remained the solo vocalist and front of the band, replacing her previous role as backing vocals.

Scarlet sometimes cuts herself with razors at performances, freely letting fans drink her blood. In 2005 several English clubs forbade her performing the display of bloodletting, because it violates English laws against the incitement to commit suicide.

On 28 November 2005, Aural Music released the album Pleasure and Pain. European distributors bought the album and it was published with permission in Europe, South America, the US, Russia, and Japan.

On 19 March 2007, they released the double CD Desire of Damnation, with live songs from The Addiction Tour 2006 and some new studio songs and remixes.

Guitarist Robert Cufaro ("Morgoth") left the band in 2006 and was replaced by Stephan Benfante.

In May 2008, Aural Music released the album Anima Noir.

On 14 January 2011, Aural Music released the album Moonlight Waltz.

Moonlight Waltz was the ninth studio album. A music video for the song Carmilla was filmed on August 28 and 29, directed by David Bracci, who worked on most of Dario Argento's films in the past decade, and has also directed the Lilith Mater Inferorum music video.

On 14 October 2016, the band released its tenth studio album, Candyland, via Scarlet Records, with a guest appearance by Fernando Ribeiro, Portuguese gothic metal band Moonspell's vocalist.

In 2021 Scarlet Records released the album In Nomine Sanguinis.

== Musical style ==
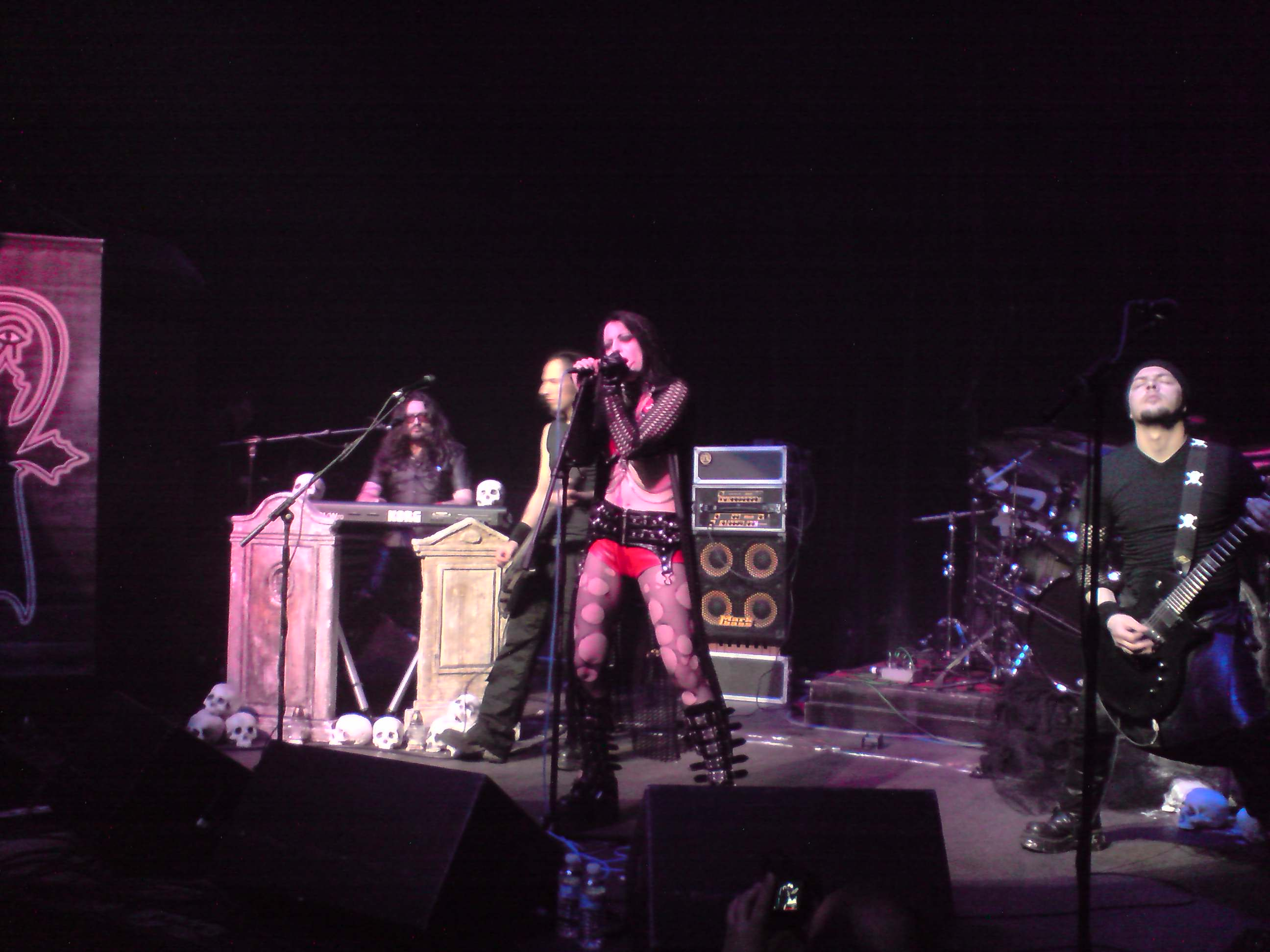
Theatres des Vampires in 2011

Theatres des Vampires is noted for the vast spectrum of styles they have encompassed during their career. At the beginning of their career Theatres des Vampires were widely regarded as melodic black metal. On their 1999 album, The Vampire Chronicles they began to introduce a more gothic approach to their music. Along with Moonspell and Cradle of Filth, Theatres des Vampires is often regarded as one of the pioneers in combining gothic and black metal. Over time the black metal influences decreased, being dropped completely on the 2004 studio album Nightbreed of Macabria, which is symphonic/gothic metal. The 2008 album, Anima Noir saw the biggest change in the band's style with the introduction of electronic sounds. This album can be regarded as gothic/industrial metal. Their 2011 album Moonlight Waltz took a turn in the symphonic direction, utilising a full orchestra, resulting in the most bombastic sound seen up until that point.

== Line-up ==
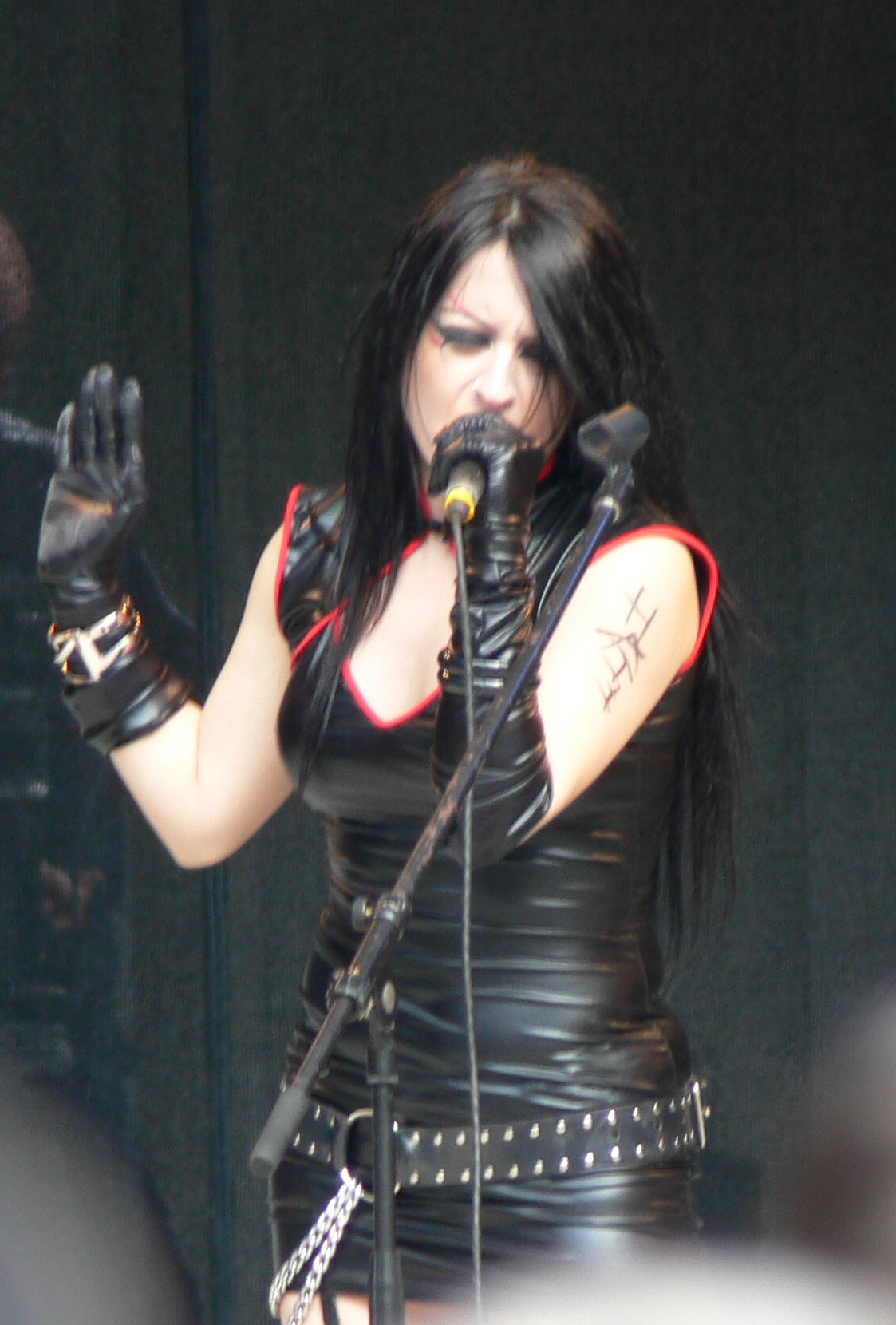
Sonya Scarlet, lead singer of Theatres des Vampires

=== Current line-up ===
- Sonya Scarlet – female/backing vocals (1999–2004), lead vocals (2004–present)
- Zimon Lijoi – bass (1994–present)
- Gabriel Valerio – drums (1997–present)
- Flavio Gianello - guitars (2017–present)

=== Former members ===
- "Agaharet" (Enrico De Dominicis) – drums (1994–1996)
- "Incubus" (Alessandro Pallotta) – guitars (1999–2002)
- "Strigoi" – guitars (1999–2001)
- "Mortifer" – guitars (2001)
- "Justine" (Anna Consuelo Cerichelli) – female, backing vocals (1999–2002)
- "Lord Vampyr" – guitars (1994–1998), vocals (1994–2004)
- "Count Morgoth" (Roberto Cufaro) – keyboards (1994–1996), guitars (2002–2006)
- Stephan Benfante - guitars (2006–2016)
- Giorgio Ferrante – guitars (2016–2017)

== Discography ==
=== Full-length albums ===
- Vampyrìsme, Nècrophilie, Nècrosadisme, Nècrophagie (1996)
- The Vampire Chronicles (1999)
- Bloody Lunatic Asylum (2001)
- Suicide Vampire (2002)
- Vampyrìsme... (2003)
- Nightbreed of Macabria (2004)
- Pleasure and Pain (2005)
- Anima Noir (2008)
- Moonlight Waltz (2011)
- Candyland (2016)
- In Nomine Sanguinis (2021)

=== Other releases ===
- Nosferatu, eine Simphonie des Gravens (demo, 1995)
- Iubilaeum Anno Dracula 2001 (EP, 2001)
- The Blackend Collection (boxed set, 2004)
- The Addiction Tour 2006 (live DVD, 2006)
- Desire of Damnation (Double CD live&remixes compilation, 2007)
- Moonlight Waltz Tour 2011 (Live CD and DVD, 2012)

== Movie soundtracks ==
- The Edge of Darkness (DVD, 2004)
- Mornau the Vampire (DVD, 2006)
- The Vampires of Bloody Island (Theatrical, 2009. DVD, 2010)
- The Cult of Lamia (TBA, 2012)
