= Aurea of Ostia =

Italian Roman Catholic saint

Saint Aurea of Ostia
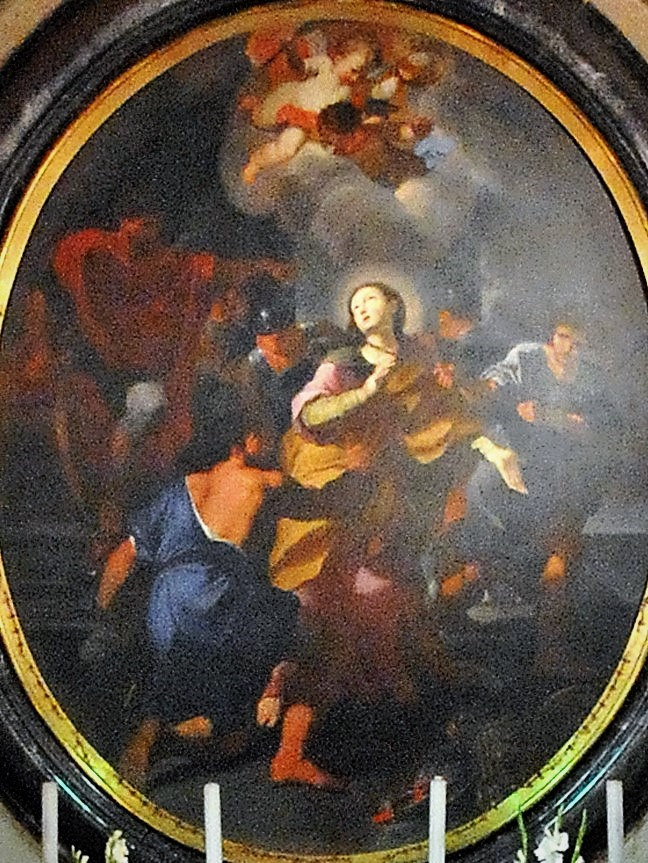
- Santa Aurea church.

Virgin and martyr
- Died: mid-3rd century Ostia, Roman Empire
- Venerated in: Roman Catholic Church, Orthodox Church
- Major shrine: Cathedral of Santa Aurea
- Feast: August 24; May 20
- Attributes: depicted being thrown into the sea with a millstone around her neck
- Patronage: Ostia, Italy

Aurea of Ostia (or Aura; in Greek, Chryse; both names mean “golden girl”) is venerated as the patron saint of Ostia.

== Background ==
She was martyred sometime during the mid-third century, either during the reign of Roman Emperor Claudius Gothicus or Trebonianus Gallus. Said to have been of royal or noble blood, Aurea was exiled from Rome to Ostia because she was a Christian. In Ostia, she lived on an estate outside of the city walls and maintained contact with local Christians, including the bishop of Ostia, Cyriacus (Quiriacus).

Miracles associated with Aurea while she was in Ostia relate how a Christian prisoner named Censorinus had his chains miraculously loosened after he had been comforted by Aurea. Seventeen soldiers (Note: Their names are given as Felix, Maximus, Taurinus, Herculanus, Nevinus, Historacinus, Menna, Commodius, Hermis, Maurus, Eusebius, Rusticus, Monaxius, Armandinus, Olympius, Eipros and Theodorus in the Acta) converted to Christianity as a result of this miracle, and were later beheaded near Ostia's Arch of Caracalla. Another states that Aurea and her friends also brought back to life the dead son of a shoemaker. Ulpius Romulus executed Aurea's friends and tortured Aurea. When she refused to sacrifice to the Roman gods, she was thrown into the sea with a stone tied around her neck.

== Veneration ==
Aurea was buried on her estate in Ostia. The church of Santa Aurea grew around her tomb. The church was rebuilt in the 15th century. A fragment of a Christian inscription that refers to Aurea was rediscovered near Santa Aurea in 1981 and later relocated to the castle of Ostia. It reads: CHRYSE HIC DORM[IT] ("Chryse sleeps here"). "It may be her original funerary inscription," one scholar states, "but it may also have been added later to the tomb." A marble column from perhaps the 5th century was discovered in 1950 near the same church. It reads S.AVR.

In the Orthodox tradition Aurea is venerated as "Chryse" and with her the companions.
