= Alessandro Nunziati =

Italian musician and writer

- Also known as: Lord Vampyr/Vampir (Draculea); Lord Alexander
- Born: 16 September 1972 (age 53); Rome, Italy
- Genres: Symphonic black metal; gothic metal; extreme metal; industrial metal; death-doom; thrash metal
- Occupations: Singer-songwriter, novelist, record producer
- Instruments: Vocals, electric guitar
- Years active: 1988–present
- Labels: Officina Rock, Zero Effect Records, Vampyria Records, Crushing Balls Records, Crank Music Group, Sleaszy Rider Records, Moribund Records

Alessandro Nunziati (born 16 September 1972), better known by his stage name Lord Vampyr, is an Italian musician, record producer and writer, famous for being the former vocalist of the gothic metal band Theatres des Vampires, as well as one of its founding members. He has many musical projects under his belt, in addition to Lord Vampyr, a gothic metal band, Malamorte, with a black metal sound, The Tomb, a completely death metal band, Perversa with a Satanic Black Metal sound, and Alex Nunziati project, a Horror heavy metal band.

== Biography ==
Nunziati was born in Rome, Italy, on 16 September 1972. As a teenager, he studied accounting and computer programming and visual, architectural, art history and plastic arts, such as painting, sculpture, design and graphics at the II° liceo artistico in Rome. He also studied Psychology at the Sapienza University of Rome. His first musical ventures were with the death-doom band Sepolcrum, formed in 1988 and of which he served as the vocalist. Sepolcrum released three demo tapes before changing its musical style to thrash metal and its name to VII Arcano in 1995. In 1994, after recording a last extended play with VII Arcano that would be released in the following year, Nunziati left the band to form Theatres des Vampires.

In 1995, Theatres des Vampires' first demo tape, Nosferatu, eine Simphonie des Gravens, was released. The tape got the attention of record label Garden of Grief, which released their first studio album, Vampyrìsme, Nècrophilie, Nècrosadisme, Nècrophagie, in the following year. It was also in 1995 when Nunziati first donned his stage name Lord Vampyr; at the time, though, it was written with an I – "Lord Vampir". (In The Vampire Chronicles, however, he would introduce himself as Lord Vampyr Draculea; it was the only Theatres des Vampires album in which he did so.) Initially a raw black metal band, Theatres des Vampires' musical style would gradually shift to a cleaner and more "produced" gothic metal as time went by.

Nunziati left Theatres des Vampires in 2004, due to creative divergences between him and the rest of the band, and began pursuing a solo career. His first solo album, De Vampyrica Philosophia, was released in 2005; its musical style was a symphonic black metal reminiscent of the early Theatres des Vampires material. This musical direction would continue to his second album, Carpathian Tragedies, released in 2009. Beginning with his third album, 2010's Horror Masterpiece, Nunziati abandoned the symphonic black metal style of his previous albums to shift to a more industrial-inflected sonority. In the same year he also released a compilation containing two old extended plays of his, entitled Vampyria. In 2005 Nunziati also formed a side project named Lord Vampyr's Shadowsreign, that released only one EP and one studio album before disbanding in 2008, reuniting in 2009 and coming to an end again in 2010.

Nunziati also serves as the vocalist and guitarist of the bands Nailed God, Cain (under the pseudonym Lord Alexander) and Malamorte.

In 2009, Nunziati published his first novel, the thriller Male innocente (Italian for "Innocent Evil"), through Gruppo Albatros il Filo. It was never released outside Italy.

His fourth studio album as Lord Vampyr , Gothika Vampyrika Heretika, was released in 2013.

The fifth album of Lord Vampyr Death Comes Under the Sign of the Cross is out in the digital stores (November 2018) and on cd (December 2018) for Sleaszy Rider Records.

November 2018: Rockshots Records signed a worldwide deal with Malamorte. The new album "Hell for All" and was released on 25 January 2019 (Europe) and 8 February 2019 (North America).

In 2019, as the frontman of Malamorte band, he signed a contract with Revalve Records, the new album "God Needs Evil" was out ok 21 February 2020 under this label.

The following year Alessandro signed a new contract with the label Moribund Records from the US, with which he will publish all his recording projects.

In 2025, Alessandro published the new album with Lord Vampyr band "The Greatest Bloodbath". Recorded at Music Up studio, and incorporating their iconic sound of Vampiric Gothic Black metal with strong classical musings, the new album also sees the band giving heavy nods to classic-era King Diamond. The album is split into 2 chapters, with the 1st chapter being a stand-alone album, and the 2nd chapter being an original motion picture soundtrack score sure to appeal to all fans of John Carpenter, Goblin and early 70’s horror films.

On 13 October he started recording with Malamorte the second chapter of the OMEN trilogy, which began with the acclaimed first chapter released in 2022.

== Discography ==
=== With VII Arcano ===
- 1990: Anteroom of the Hell (demo tape – as Sepolcrum)
- 1992: Flowers Upon the Grave (demo tape – as Sepolcrum)
- 1994: Promo 1994 (demo tape – as Sepolcrum)
- 1995: Gather My Blood Forever (EP)

=== With Theatres des Vampires ===
- 1995: Nosferatu, eine Simphonie des Gravens (demo tape)
- 1996: Vampyrìsme, Nècrophilie, Nècrosadisme, Nècrophagie
- 1999: The Vampire Chronicles
- 2001: Iubilaeum Anno Dracula 2001 (EP)
- 2001: Bloody Lunatic Asylum
- 2002: Suicide Vampire
- 2003: Vampyrìsme...
- 2004: Nightbreed of Macabria

=== Solo ===
- 2005: De Vampyrica Philosophia
- 2007: Blood Bathory (EP)
- 2009: Carpathian Tragedies
- 2010: Horror Masterpiece
- 2010: Vampyria (compilation)
- 2013: Gothika Vampyrika Heretika
- 2019: Death Comes Under the Sign of the Cross
- 2021: The Vampire's Legacy
- 2025: The Greatest Bloodbath

=== With Lord Vampyr's Shadowsreign ===
- 2005: Cult of Lilith (EP)
- 2006: Bloodcity: The Forgotten Memories, Part I

=== With Cain ===
- 2005: Dioscuri Aurea Sæcula (demo)
- 2007: Triumvira

=== With Nailed God ===
- 2009: Glorification of the Unborn

=== With Malamorte ===
- 2014: The Fall of Babylon (EP)
- 2016: Devilish Illusions
- 2017: Satan Goes to Heaven to Destroy the Kingdom of God
- 2019: Hell for All
- 2020: God Needs Evil
- 2021: Mass Cult Suicide
- 2022: Omen
- 2024: Abisso
- 2025: OMEN II (studio recording)

== Solo band members ==
Current members

- Lord Vampyr – vocals (2005–present)
- Diego Tasciotti – drums (2008–present)
- Ferenc Nádasdy – keyboards, bass (2011–present)
- Gabriele Martella – guitars (2021–present)

Past members

- Giuseppe De Paolo – guitars (2019–2020)
- Fabrizio Curcio – guitars (2017–2018)
- Andrea Taddei – guitars (2008–2021)
- Nighthorn (Silvano Leone) — bass (2005–2008)
- Aeshla (Francesco Struglia) — drums (2005–2008)
- Nepesh-Ra (Cristiano Trionfera) — guitars (2005–2008)
- S.K. — guitars (2005–2008)
- Alexiel – keyboards (2005–2008)
- Count Morgoth (Roberto Cufaro) — keyboards (2005)
- Endymion (Riccardo Studer) — keyboards (2008–2010)
- Lady Eter – female backing vocals (2008–2010)
- Prometherion (Fabio Palazzola) — guitars (2010–2011)
- Lady Noir (Mariachiara Castaldi) — female backing vocals (2010–2011)
- STN Zyklon (Michele Arnone) — guitars (2010–2014)
- Aerioch (Andrea di Nino) — bass (2008–2014)
