= A Midnight Visit =

Australian immersive theatre experience

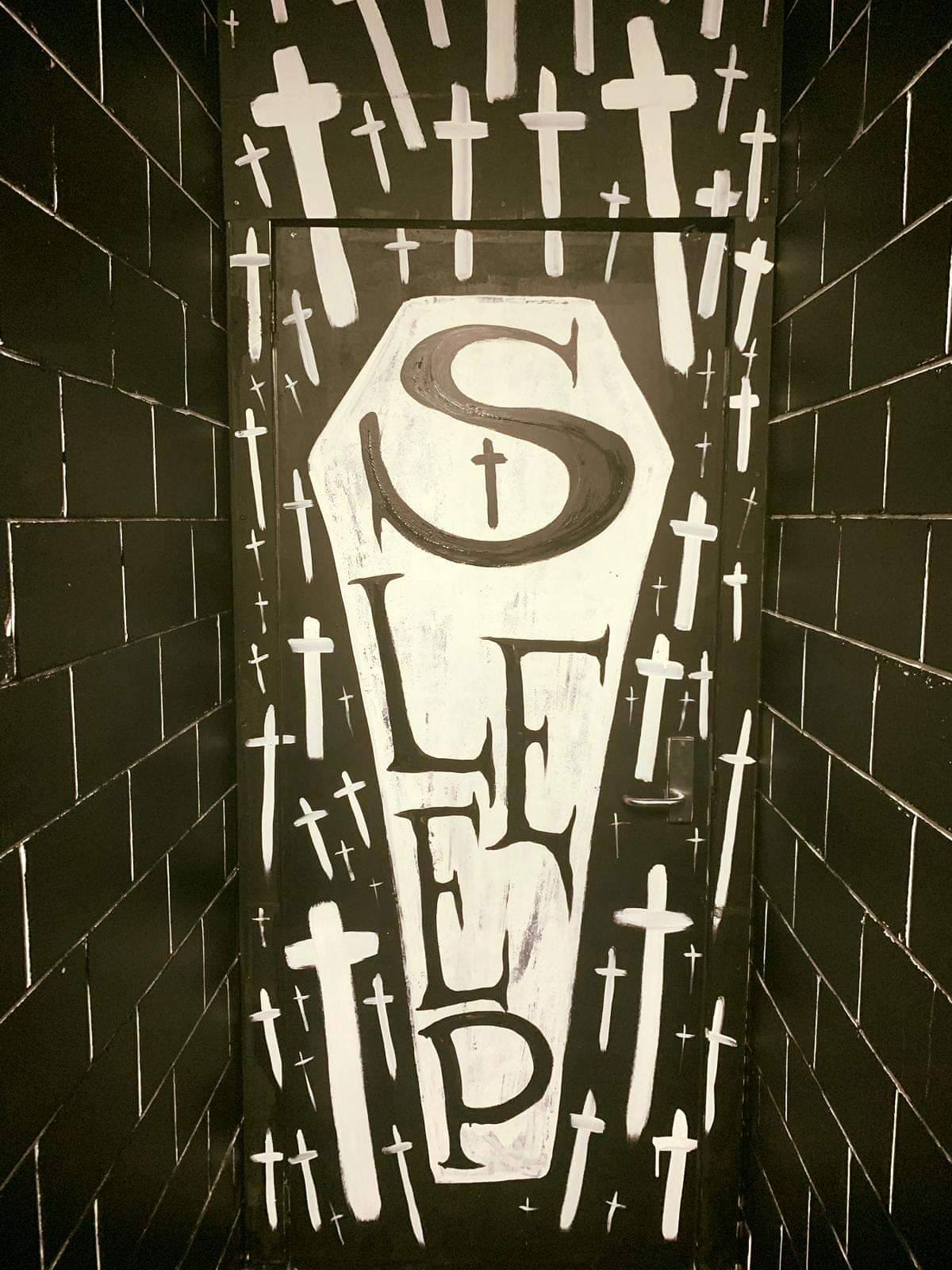
- The doorway entrance to the dream from A Midnight Visit
- Original language: English
- Genre: Immersive, macabre

Premiere
- Date: October, 2018
- Place: Newtown, Sydney, Australia
- amidnightvisit.com

A Midnight Visit is an Australian multi-sensory immersive theatre experience based upon the works of Edgar Allan Poe. The audience walks at their own pace through a variety of theatrically designed rooms featuring adult concepts, uneven floors, small and large spaces, and low-level lighting. Finding themselves as co-creators of their own experience, audiences are transported into a macabre dream world, and negotiate encounters with peculiar characters who sing, act, dance and even perform circus aerials.

== Production ==
Created in 2018 by Kirsten Siddle and Danielle Harvey of theatre company Broad Encounters, the production has toured sold-out shows in Sydney, Melbourne, Perth, and Brisbane. Sydney (03 Oct 2018 - 09 Dec 2018)

- Perth "House of Usher Girls School" (24 Jan 2019 - 04 Mar 2019)
- Melbourne (30 Jul 2019 - 18 Nov 2019)
- Brisbane (30 Jul 2021 - 30 Jan 2022)

In November 2021 it became Brisbane's longest running theatre production breaking the record held by The Phantom of the Opera in 1996–1997.

== Format ==
Typically transforming abandoned city warehouses into theatrical playgrounds, A Midnight Visit follows in the footsteps of internationally renowned promenade theatre projects such as New York's Sleep No More (2011 play). With more than 10 hours of simultaneous performance in each 60 to 70 minute viewing, a site production can be set over 2500 square metres and involve up to 250 creators.

"Part choose your own adventure, part performance, part film-set, part playground, part sound world. Set in an abandoned warehouse over two floors and more than 30 rooms... a multi-sensory and magnificently macabre experience, A Midnight Visit invites you to explore a dark dreamworld of thrills, obsession, decadence and awe. All senses will be tantilised - even (especially?) the sixth."

There is over 30+ rooms each in the various iterations with the latest Brisbane production having 36 rooms.

== Characters ==
=== Core characters ===
Characters that have been in every iteration of the show include:

==== Edgar Allan Poe ====
"Our tortured dreamer in A Midnight Visit. Each room brings him face to face with ghosts from his past and the creatures of his imagination. Madness is sure to take him!"

==== The Raven ====
Based on The Raven narrative poem.

"The charismatic human-animal hybrid stalks the residents and visitors of A Midnight Visit as the incarnation of death and guilt. Beware the mischief maker..."

==== Madeline Usher ====
Character from The Fall of the House of Usher

"Stuck in a sick and twisted relationship with her brother, her body and mind begin to deteriorate. Be careful, behind the laughing mouth are sharp teeth"

==== Rodrick Usher ====
Character from The Fall of the House of Usher.

"A hypochondriac gothic dandy. Fearful and crazy, plotting, or is he remembering, his twin sister... entombed alive..."

==== The Actress ====
"Representing the ‘fatalistic dead woman’ prevalent in literature and film. Our Actress shapeshifts through classic texts – how many will you know? She lives for the applause. She may die when it stops. Adore her, The Actress, a shapeshifting beauty with a sinister streak."

==== Ligeia (The Nurse) ====
"A cruel nurse who runs a tight ship, or a former patient? A nightly metamorphosis occurs as Ligeia sheds her old skin to begin again."

==== The King ====
"Sometimes a king full of bravado and beer, and sometimes an orangutan full of fury. The King is powerful, egotistical and temperamental."

Amalgamation of several characters/figures/ideas in Poe's work, but does act as the King from the Hop Frog short story.

=== Additional characters ===
Characters that do not appear in every production:

- Virginia Poe - "The young and innocent wife and first-cousin of Poe. We find the muse Virginia singing and dying a bloody death on endless repeat."
- Hop Frog - "Jester to The King, enjoy his tricks and merriment but remember, they are but a momentary diversion of the true horrors that await us all. He can see who you really are..."
- Detective Dupin - "The ultimate game player likes to get up close and personal with his work. But has he gone too far? In knowing the criminal mind, has reason and motive now left the building?"
- The Black Cat - "Sneaky, slinky and strong, the Cat will help guide you through the maze of spaces. Follow at your own risk. Deeper and darker you will journey. Bubble, bubble, toil and trouble..."
- The Undertaker
- Lizzie Reid - a school girl character that was specific to the Perth production, utilising the Old Perth Girls School as the venue. "School Girl Lizzie Reid reads a lot of Poe. She dreams about The Raven. She hallucinates tombs and bloodied teeth. Now dead, she has dragged Poe and his phantasms out of the shadow world."

=== Seasonal sharacters ===
During shows around Halloween, additional performers and characters were added to the temporarily to the production including:

- The Scarlet Prince
- Alice and Alice
- Isabel of Fairyland
- The Sailor
- Monsieur Mallard (The Doctor)

== Cast ==
Character	Sydney	Perth	Melbourne	Brisbane
Edgar Allan Poe	James Raggatt	Nick Maclaine	Andrew Johnston	Sho Eba
Virginia Poe	Bobbie Jean-Henning	Bobbie-Jean Henning	Bobbie-Jean Henning Meg Hickey (Sep 2019)	Gabby Caron*
The Actress	Megan Drury	Megan Drury	Megan Drury	Meg Hickey
Madeline Usher	Bri Emrich	Bri Emrich	Bri Emrich	Bri Emrich Rachel Dowse (Dec 2021)
Rodrick Usher	Jason Winston	Tom Oliver	Cameron MacDonald	Daniel Kirkby Tom Oliver (Jan 2022)**
Nurse (Ligeia)	Hannah Raven	Hannah Raven	Hannah Raven	Hannah Raven Melissa Budd (Nov 2021)
The King	Drew Fairley	Stee Andrews	Stee Andrews	Lucinda Shaw
Hop Frog	N/A	Jon Madd	Kristian Santic	Kristian Santic
The Raven	Johnny Hawkins	Hudson Emery	Hudson Emery	Gina Tay-Limpus Gabby Carbon (Nov 2021)
The Black Cat	Caitlin Drysdale	May Greenberg	Saro Sawakchim Piaera Lauritz	Ela Bartilomo*
Detective Dupin	N/A	Andrew Hale	John Marc Desengano	Reagan Warner*
The Scarlet Prince	N/A	N/A	N/A	Reuben Kaye*
Alice and Alice	N/A	N/A	N/A	Cocoloco*
Monsieur Maillard aka The Doctor	N/A	N/A	Drew Fairley*	N/A
The Sailor	N/A	N/A	Hilton Denis*	N/A
Lizzie Reid	N/A	Atara Lebransky	N/A	N/A
The Undertaker	Hudson Emery			
Isabel of Fairyland	N/A	N/A	Penelope Elena*	N/A

* denotes performers/characters that made special appearances for Halloween season shows.

** Tom Oliver was called in short notice to temporarily perform the role of Rodrick Usher following cast absences due to COVID-19.

== Works referenced ==
=== Fiction by Edgar Allan Poe ===
- The Balloon-Hoax
- Berenice
- The Black Cat
- The Cask of Amontillado
- The Fall of the House of Usher
- The Gold-Bug
- Hop-Frog
- Ligeia
- The Masque of the Red Death
- Morella
- MS. Found in a Bottle
- The Murders in the Rue Morge
- The Narrative of Arthur Gordon Pym of Nantucket
- The Oval Portrait
- The Pit and the Pendulum
- A Predicament
- Some Words with a Mummy
- The System of Doctor Tarr and Professor Ferther
- The Tell-Tale Heart

=== Poems by Edgar Allan Poe ===
- A Dream Within a Dream
- Alone
- Annabel Lee
- The Bells
- The City in the Sea
- Bridal Ballad
- The Conqueror Worm
- Deep in Earth
- Dream-Land
- Fairy-Land
- For Annie
- The Happiest Hour
- The Lake
- Lenore
- The Raven
- Tamerlane
- Ulalume

=== Other works ===
- Angel of Mine (traditional)
- Confide in Me (Kylie Minogue)
- David Attenborough special on Orangutans
- Hail Mary (traditional)
- I Know a Noble Heart that Beats (Fanny Osgood)
- Maria Clem to Neilson Poe, private letter
- Othello (Shakespeare)
- Philosophy of Religion (Thomas Dick)
- Romeo & Juliet (Shakespeare)
- To- (Sarah Whitman)
- Valentine Poem (Virginia Poe)
- Your Heart is a Music-box, dearest! (Fanny Osgood)

=== Films (quoted by The Actress) ===
- American Psycho
- Basic Instinct
- The Birds
- Beetlejuice
- Carrie
- The Cook, the Thief, His Wife & Her Lover
- The Crow
- Dracula
- The Evil Dead
- The Exorcist
- Flatliners
- The Fly
- Heathers
- Herditary
- Get Out
- It
- King Kong
- The Lost Boys
- Misery
- Mulholland Drive
- The Omen
- Penny Dreadful
- The People Under the Stairs
- Pet Semetary
- Poltergeist
- Psycho
- The Sixth Sense
- Twin Peaks

=== Music ===
- Adagio in G Minor (T. Albinoni)
- Applause (Lady Gaga, Dino Zisis, Julien Arias, Martin Bresso, Nick Monson, Nicolas Mercier, Paul Blair, William Grigaheine)
- Chandelier (Sia & J. Shatkin)
- Creep (Radiohead, Colin Greenwood, Ed O'Brien, Jonny Greenwood, Philip Selway, Thom Yorke)
- Every Breath You Take (Sting)
- Funhouse - Digital Dog Remix (P!nk, Tony Kamal, Jimmy Harry)
- I Dreamt I Dwelt in Marble Halls (M. W. Balfe & A. Bunn)
- I Want You (Elvis Costello)
- Komm, suer Tod, komm selge ruh BVW 478 'Come sweet death, come, blessed rest' (J.S. Bach)
- One Way or Another (D. Harry & N. Harrison)
- SHOTS (LMFAO, Lil John, Eric D-Lux, J. Smith, S. A. Gordy, Stefan Kendal Gordy, E. Delatorre)
- Stay (Shakspears Sister), Siobahn Fahey, Marcella Detroit, David A. Stewart)
- Sucker For Pain (Lil Wayne, Wiz Khalifa, Imagine Dragons)
- Symphonie fantastique. Op. 14 (H. Berlioz)
- The Show Must Go On (Queen, Brian May, Freddie Mercury, John Deacon, Roger Taylor)
- When I am Laid in Earth, Dido & Aeneas (H. Purcell)

== Reception ==
A Midnight Visit is Broad Encounters’ first large-scale work, winning Concrete Playground's Best New Event of 2018 for Australia and New Zealand.

The 2019 Perth iteration of the production, as part of Fringe World, was awarded four and half stars by Simon Collins of The West Australian. "Ninety minutes was barely enough time to explore this lurid, chaotic, enchanting and voyeuristic world. No two experiences are the same."

The Age wrote a four star review of the 2019 Melbourne production. "As an homage to Poe, you couldn't ask for more."

The extended 2021 season in Brisbane was lauded by Phil Brown, Arts Editor of The Courier Mail, as, "An incredibly enriching experience. You will never have seen anything like this before, I promise. It's a blast!".
