= Annabel Lee =

Poem by Edgar Allan Poe

- by Edgar Allan Poe
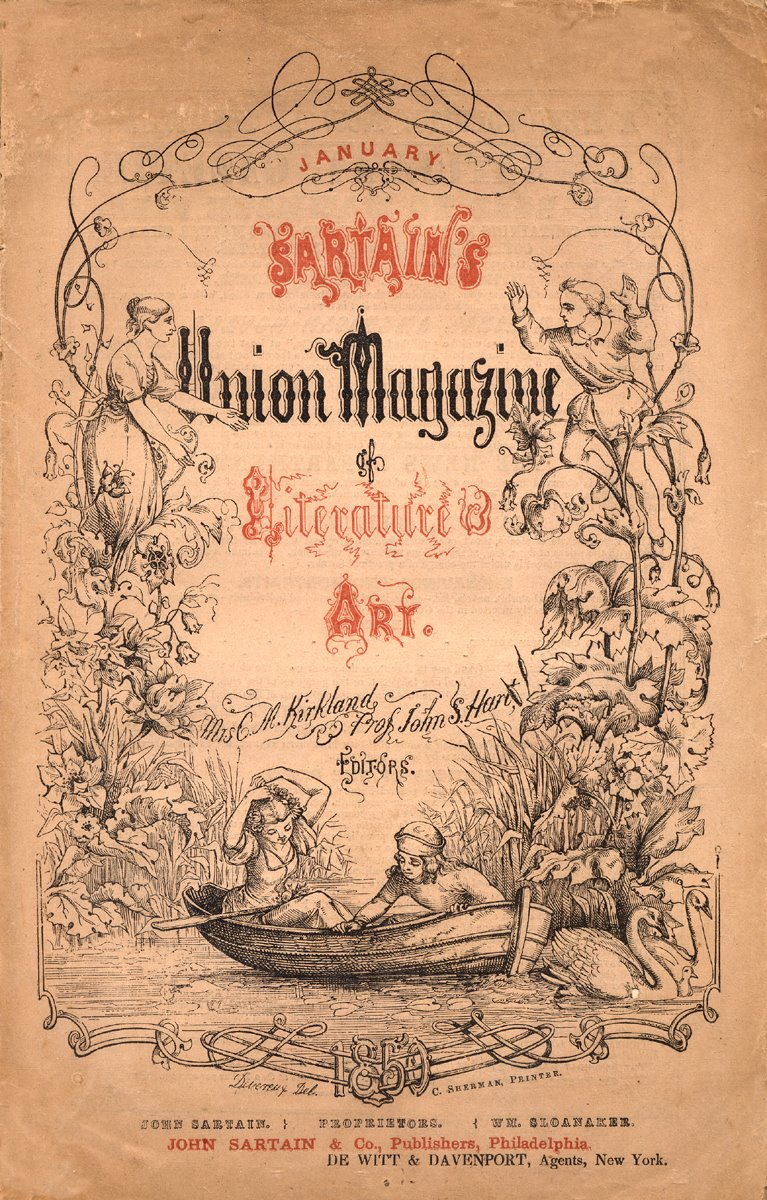
- Sartain's Union Magazine of Literature and Art, Philadelphia, January 1850
- Country: United States
- Language: English
- Publisher: Sartain's Union Magazine, John Sartain
- Publication date: 1849

Full text
- Annabel Lee at Wikisource

"Annabel Lee" is the last complete poem composed by American author Edgar Allan Poe. Like many of Poe's poems, it explores the theme of the death of a beautiful woman. The narrator, who fell in love with Annabel Lee when they were young, has a love for her so strong that even angels are envious. He retains his love for her after her death. There has been debate over who, if anyone, was the inspiration for "Annabel Lee". Though many women have been suggested, Poe's wife Virginia Eliza Clemm Poe is one of the more credible candidates. Written in 1849, it was not published until shortly after Poe's death that same year.

== Synopsis ==
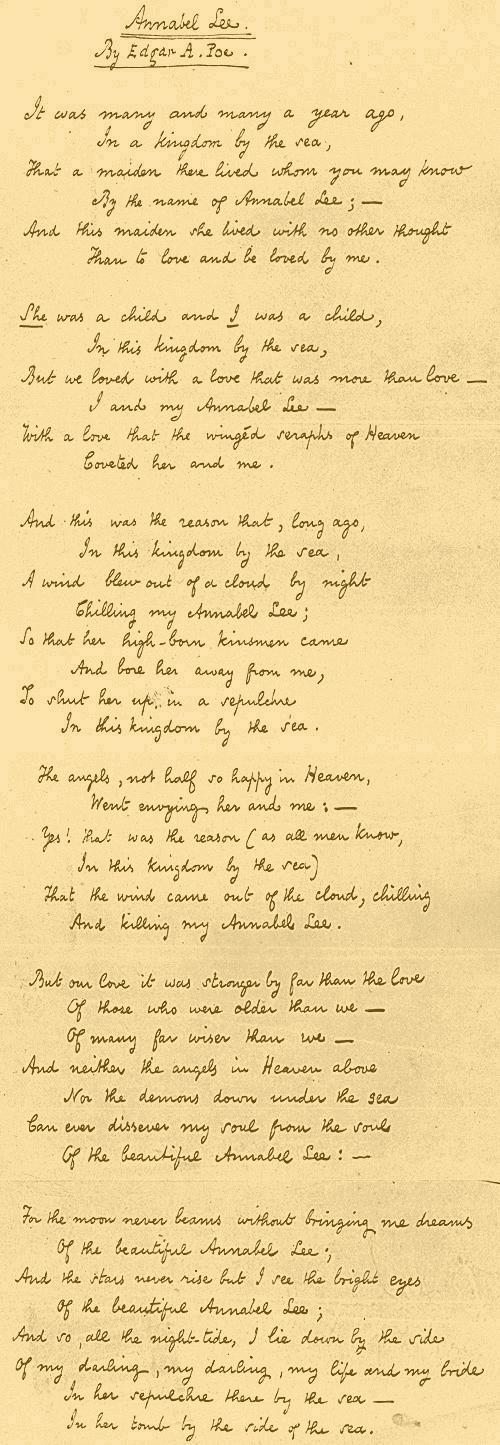
Poe's manuscript for "Annabel Lee", Columbia University Rare Book and Manuscript Library

The poem's narrator describes his love for Annabel Lee, which began many years ago in a "kingdom by the sea". Though they were young, their love for each other burned with such intensity that even angels were envious. For this reason, the narrator believes the seraphim caused her death. Even so, their love is strong enough that it extends beyond the grave and the narrator believes their two souls are still entwined. Every night, the narrator dreams of Annabel Lee and sees the brightness of her eyes in the stars. Every night, the narrator lies down by her side in her tomb by the sea.

== Analysis ==
Like many other Poe poems including "The Raven", "Ulalume", and "To One in Paradise", "Annabel Lee" follows the theme of the death of a beautiful woman, which Poe called "the most poetical topic in the world". Like women in many other works by Poe, she marries young and is struck with illness. The poem focuses on an ideal love which is unusually strong. In fact, the narrator's actions show that he not only loves Annabel Lee, but he worships her, something he can only do after her death. The narrator admits that he and Annabel Lee were children when they fell in love, but his explanation that angels murdered her is in itself childish, suggesting he has failed to mature since then. His repetition of this assertion suggests he is trying to rationalize his own excessive feelings of loss.

Unlike "The Raven", in which the narrator believes he will "nevermore" be reunited with his love, "Annabel Lee" says the two will be together again, as not even demons "can ever dissever" their souls.

=== Poetic structure ===
"Annabel Lee" consists of six stanzas, three with six lines, one with seven, and two with eight, with the rhyme pattern differing slightly in each one. Though it is not technically a ballad, Poe referred to it as one. Like a ballad, the poem uses repetition of words and phrases purposely to create its mournful effect. The name Annabel Lee emphasizes the letter "L", a frequent device in Poe's female characters such as "Eulalie", "Lenore", and "Ulalume".

The Edgar Allan Poe Society of Baltimore, Maryland has identified 11 versions of "Annabel Lee" that were published between 1849 and 1850. The biggest variation is in the final line:

Original manuscript: "In her tomb by the side of the sea"
Alternative version: "In her tomb by the sounding sea"

== Inspiration ==
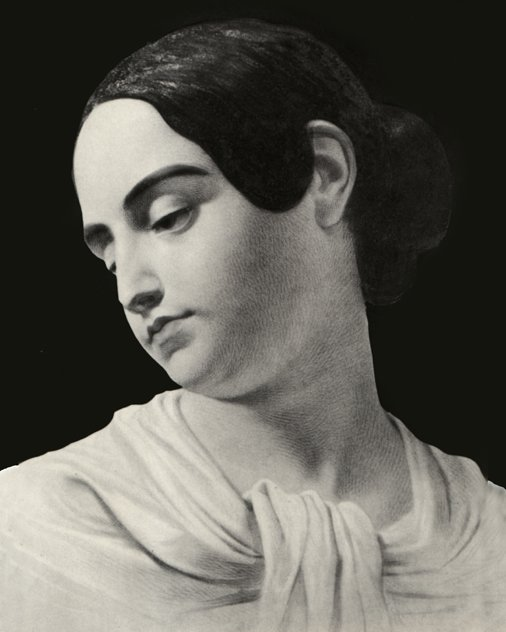
Poe's wife Virginia is often assumed to be the inspiration for "Annabel Lee".

It is unclear on whom the eponymous character Annabel Lee is based. Biographers and critics usually suggest Poe's frequent use of the "death of a beautiful woman" theme stems from the repeated loss of women throughout his own life, including his mother Eliza Poe and his foster mother Frances Allan. Biographers often interpret that "Annabel Lee" was written for Poe's wife Virginia, who had died two years prior, as was suggested by poet Frances Sargent Osgood, though Osgood is herself a candidate for the poem's inspiration. A strong case can be made for Poe's wife Virginia: She was the one he loved as a child, the only one who had been his bride, and the only one who had died. Autobiographical readings of the poem have also been used to support the theory that Virginia and Poe never consummated their marriage, as "Annabel Lee" was a "maiden". Critics, including T. O. Mabbott, believed that Annabel Lee was merely the product of Poe's gloomy imagination and that Annabel Lee was no real person in particular. A childhood sweetheart of Poe's named Sarah Elmira Royster believed the poem was written with her in mind and that Poe himself said so. Sarah Helen Whitman and Sarah Anna Lewis also claimed to have inspired the poem.

== Publication history and reception ==
"Annabel Lee" was probably composed in May 1849. Poe took steps to ensure that the poem would be seen in print. He gave a copy to Rufus Wilmot Griswold, his literary executor and personal rival, gave another copy to John Thompson to repay a $5 debt, and sold a copy to Sartain's Union Magazine for publication. Though Sartain's was the first authorized printing in January 1850, Griswold was the first to publish it on October 9, 1849, two days after Poe's death as part of his obituary of Poe in the Horace Greeley newspaper the New-York Daily Tribune. Thompson had it published in the Southern Literary Messenger in November 1849.

"Annabel Lee" was an inspiration for Vladimir Nabokov, especially for his novel Lolita (1955), in which the narrator, as a child, falls in love with the terminally ill Annabel Leigh "in a princedom by the sea". Originally, Nabokov titled the novel The Kingdom by the Sea. Nabokov later used this as the title of the Lolita "doppelgänger novel" in Look at the Harlequins!.

== Adaptations ==
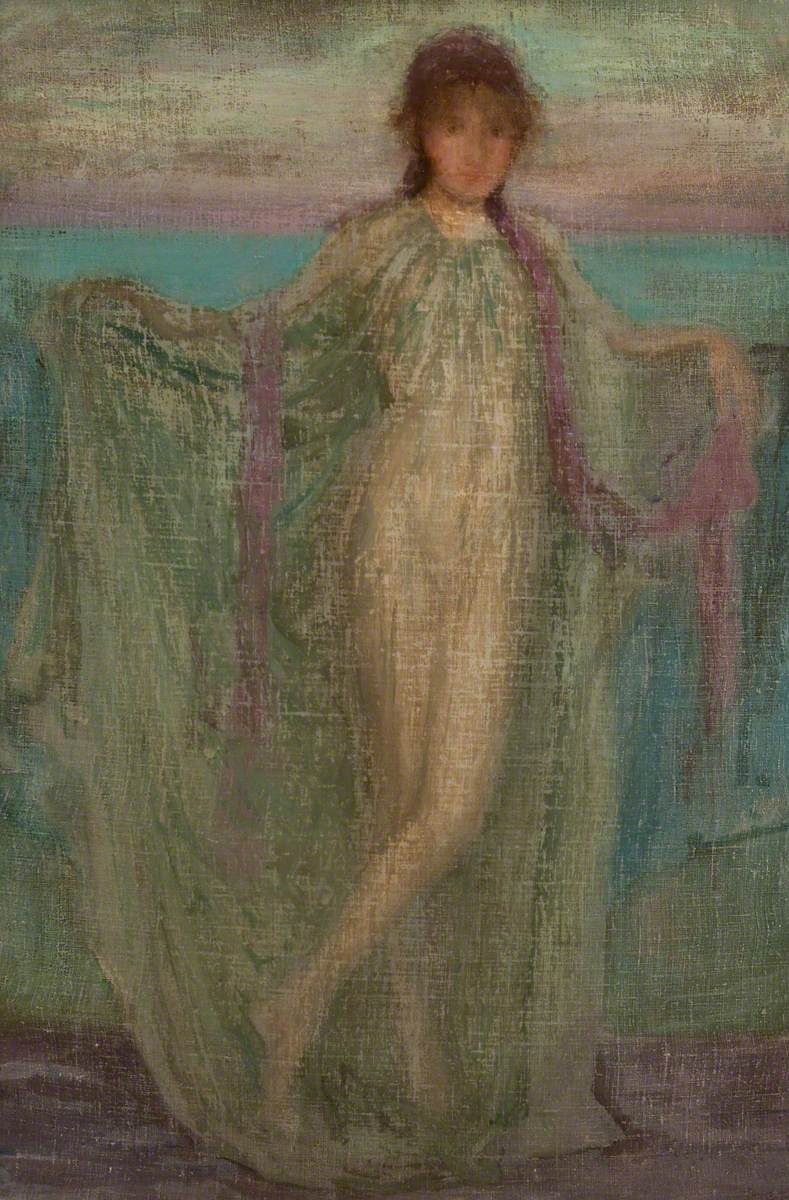
"Annabel Lee" by James McNeill Whistler, Hunterian Museum and Art Gallery, Glasgow, UK

- Artist James McNeill Whistler used the poem as inspiration for several paintings.
- The English composer Henry David Leslie (1822–96) set this as a ballad for voice and piano, respelling as "Annabelle Lee".
- The 1914 silent film The Avenging Conscience is based on "Annabel Lee" and Poe's short story "The Tell-Tale Heart".
- 1968 Short Film "Annabel Lee" featuring Paul Le Mat (an unknown at the time) and Margo Duke - directed by Ronald R. Morante and Producer Paul Wolff - won best International Short Subject Competition for Best Cinematography. All rights were sold to Warner Bros. ca. 1969.
- An adapted version of the poem appears on Sarah Jarosz's 2011 album Follow Me Down.
- Stevie Nicks recorded a version of this poem on her 2011 album In Your Dreams.
- Joan Baez recorded a version of this poem on her 1967 album Joan, with music by Don Dilworth.
- The band Alesana based three albums (The Emptiness, A Place Where the Sun Is Silent and Confessions) on the poem and called it The Annabel Trilogy.
- The poem appears on Marissa Nadler's album Ballads of Living and Dying.
- An adaptation appears in the song "Three" by the band La Dispute on their first spoken word EP, Here, Hear. and in the song "Fall Down, Never Get Back Up Again" on their album Somewhere at the Bottom of the River Between Vega and Altair.
- The poem was set to music by the English composer Joseph Charles Holbrooke (5 July 1878 – 5 August 1958) as a ballad for voice and orchestra Op. 41b (1905)
- An adapted version of the poem by Spanish group Radio Futura on their album La canción de Juan Perro, 1987 (music by Luis Auserón, lyric adapted by Santiago Auserón).
- The poem was adapted as the song "Annabel Lee" on the Tiger Army album Tiger Army II: Power of Moonlite
- The poem was translated to Hebrew by Ze'ev Jabotinsky and performed by various Israeli artists, among them Yossi Banai, Yoni Bloch and Shlomo Artzi (who performed the song both in Hebrew and in the original).
- The poem was also the base for Lady Midnight by Cassandra Clare as the first book in the Dark Artifices series. Each chapter title is taken directly from the poem.
- The web series Kissing in the Rain features a shortened version of the poem with Sean Persaud as Edgar Allan Poe and Mary Kate Wiles as Annabel Lee. Both actors reprised their roles for the web series Edgar Allan Poe's Murder Mystery Dinner Party, though they are separate universes and their stories are not connected.
- The band Black Rebel Motorcycle Club made a song out of the poem. The piano led piece is an iTunes pre-order bonus track on their sixth studio album, Beat the Devil's Tattoo. The album title is itself a phrase taken from another Edgar Allan Poe short story, "The Devil in the Belfry".
- In the Disney movie Holes, the character Sam recites the poem to Kate to express his feelings for her.
- Alexander Veljanov recorded an adaptation called "Lied für Annabel Lee" in German for the Edgar Allan Poe Projekt – Visionen (Double Album) 2006.
- The plot for the video game The Dark Eye is a loose adaptation of the poem, which is read in-game by author William S. Burroughs.
- A song by the American indie rock band Bright Eyes "Jetsabel removes the undesirables" shares some of the same themes and contains direct references. The last lines of the song are almost identical to the beginning of the last stanza of the poem.
- "Another New World", a song based on this poem, appears on Josh Ritter's 2010 album So Runs the World Away. The song was covered by the Punch Brothers for their 2012 EP Ahoy!. In this version, Annabel Lee is the singer's beloved sailing ship, which is destroyed during a failed polar expedition.
- The progressive rock band Far from Your Sun set the poem to music on their 2015 album In the Beginning... Was the Emotion.
- In the 2015 book by Jenny Han, P.S. I Still Love You, and its 2020 movie adaptation, the poem is used as a Valentine's Day gift, when the person giving the poem as a gift claims they wrote it. The name Annabel Lee is changed to Lara Jean.

== See also ==
- Poems by Edgar Allan Poe
