= Site-specific theatre =

Style of theatre seating or performance

Site-specific theatre is a theatrical production that is performed at a unique location other than a theatre. This site may have been built without any intention of serving theatrical purposes (for example, a hotel, courtyard, or converted building). It may also simply be an unconventional space for theatre (for example, a forest). Site-specific theatre seeks to use the properties of a unique site's landscape, rather than a typical theatre stage, to add depth to a theatrical production. Sites are selected based on their ability to amplify storytelling and form a more vivid backdrop for the actors in a theatrical production. A performance in a traditional theatre venue that has been transformed to resemble a specific space (for example, a junkyard), can also be considered as site-specific, as long as it no longer has the functionality (i.e. seats, stages) that a traditional theatre would have.

Site-specific theatre frequently takes place in structures originally built for non-theatrical reasons that have since been renovated or converted for new, performance-based functions.

It often involves research of the site prior to the performance.

Definitions of site-specific theatre are complicated by its use in both theatre studies and visual art, where it is also referred to as site-specific performance.

== Examples ==
- In 1981, Laura Farabough performed Surface Tension at Strawberry Canyon Pool, on the UC Berkeley Campus and at the UCSF Pool.
- Storming Mont Albert By Tram (1982) was performed on a moving tram by the Australian company TheatreWorks. Audiences were immersed as fellow passengers with various characters who entered and left the tram at regular stops along the way. The production was staged eight times over a dozen years on trams in Melbourne and Adelaide and helped launch an outbreak of site-specific theatre in Melbourne which lasted throughout the 1980s and into the early 1990s.
- Breaking Up In Balwyn (1983): this was a play staged as a divorce party set and performed on “The Yarra Princess” – a riverboat sailing along Melbourne's Yarra River. The audience were especially invited as the "very best friends" of gay divorcee, Samantha Hart-Byrne. The celebration, however, was disrupted by the arrival of her ex-husband (disguised as a “gorilla-gram”) and by a visit (raid) by the Income Tax Evasion Squad.
- Living Rooms (1986) https://www.theatreworks.org.au/archive-feature-living-rooms-1986/ Through scenes enacted in various rooms of “Linden”, a large St Kilda mansion, Living Rooms traces the social and cultural progress of the building from family mansion, to boarding house, to contemporary art gallery. Audiences moved through the building in small groups where they watchedthe lives of the imaginary characters who lived in Linden at key moments in its history.
- Full House/No Vacancies (1989). Using a similar site-specific template to Living Rooms (moving audience groups from room to room), Full House/No Vacancies was staged in the bedrooms of a typical boarding house in St. Kilda in the late 1980s. The building (the "Linga Longa" boarding house) was facing demolition and development that would have evicted its tenants. However, working collectively, the tenants manage to expose the developer and save their home.
- Ferry Play, a podcast play for the Staten Island Ferry in New York City.
- Psycho-So-Matic, and Downsize, staged by Chicago's Walkabout Theatre in a laundromat and a series of public restrooms, respectively.
- Girls Just Wanna Have Fund, staged by Women's Project in the lobbies, escalators, and bridges of New York's World Financial Centre.
- Supernatural Chicago, staged in a nightclub.
- Small Metal Objects, staged by Australia's Back To Back Theatre at the Whitehall Ferry Terminal.
- Little Shop of Horrors: a production of the musical was presented at Bool's Flower Shop in Ithaca, New York on April 24, 2019. It was produced by Jacob Stuckelman.
- Ragtime On Ellis Island, a concert musical, was presented on Ellis Island on August 8, 2016 in an area that is not usually used for performances.
- Sweeney Todd: When the Tooting Arts Club production transferred off Broadway, the group transformed the Barrow Street Theatre into a working re-creation of Harrington's pie shop. This is an example of immersive theatre, as they built into a pre-existing space; it is not considered a found space.
- The Site-Specific Theatre Bot: https://twitter.com/TheatreSite @TheatreSite is an automated Twitter 'bot' that tweets out ideas for imagined site-specific performances.
- A Midnight Visit, staged in abandoned warehouses across Australia and based upon the works of Edgar Allan Poe.
- The Ramlila, a dramatic enactment of the Hindu history Ramayana, could be considered a type of site-specific theatre. Started in 1830 by Maharaja Udit Narayan Singh of Varanasi, it is held each year over a period of 31 days during the autumn festive season of Dussehra at Ramnagar, Varanasi in India. The Ramlila is staged in permanent structures created as sets throughout the three square mile area where the audience follow the actors. The Ramlila was declared by UNESCO to be a Masterpiece of the Oral and Intangible Heritage of Humanity in 2005.

Following on from the success of TheatreWorks' Storming Mont Albert By Tram in 1982, an outbreak of site-specific theatre took place across Melbourne throughout the 1980s. This saw the production of further plays on trams (Storming St. Kilda by Tram, Storming Glenelg by Tram) riverboats (Breaking Up In Balwyn), busses (Bus, Son of Tram) houses (Fefu and Her Friends, Living Rooms, Full House/No Vacancies, Looking In, Looking Out) pubs (The Pub Show) a cinema (D J View) a woollen mill (The Wool Game) a nursing home (Vital Signs) a football club dressing room (Not Waving) a scout hall (In Cahoots) a prison (Hard Labour, Mate) as well as shopping centres, camping grounds, parks and gardens (The Go Anywhere Show, Wind in the Willows). Much of this work is documented in Really Moving Drama – Taking Theatre for a Ride (2016) ISBN 9781534866751; Staging the World – Theatre In the Space Age (Adventures in Site-Specific Performance) ISBN 9780648599890; and A Short History of TheatreWorks (1979 to 1994) ISBN 9780648900207

Site-specific theatre can also include environmental theatre, a production that attempts to immerse the audience in the performance by bringing the action off the stage area. For example, some acting may happen in aisles. In the case of black box theatre, acting platforms may even be built between audience sections. Sometimes a performer will talk to or otherwise involve an audience member in a scene. This can be a real audience member, as in interactive theatre, or a confederate actor planted to appear as an audience member.

There are variations on site-specific theatre, including but not limited to:

- Found space theatre, in which a pre-existing production is placed in an environment similar to the one in which the play is set (for example, performing Hamlet in a Danish Castle).
- Promenade theatre, in which audience members stand and walk about rather than sit, watching the action happening among them and even following the performers around the performance space.

== Criticism ==
A 2008 Guardian article titled "Site-specific theatre? Please be more specific" argued that the term was quickly becoming a "promotional catchword" or marketing device used to describe any show not staged in a purpose-built auditorium. Theatre professor, Bertie Ferdman, suggests that the term has become too broad and that the art form is at "risk of losing meaning altogether".

== See also ==
- Immersive theatre
- Site-specific art
