= The Decade (EP) =

The Decade EP

EP by Alesana
- Released: April 1, 2014
- Recorded: 2013–2014
- Genres: Post-hardcore; mall screamo; emo; melodic metalcore
- Length: 21:32 (27:48 with hidden track)
- Labels: Artery Recordings, Revival Recordings
- Producers: Neil Engle, Shawn Milke

Alesana chronology
A Place Where the Sun Is Silent (2011)	The Decade EP (2014)	Confessions (2015)

Singles from The Decade EP
- 1. "Nevermore" Released: March 3, 2014; 2. "Double or Nothing" Released: March 26, 2014

The Decade is the second EP by American post-hardcore band Alesana. It was released in April 2014, and the release used a different stylization of lyrics compared to their past releases. This album was made to celebrate the 10 years as a band. This is Alesana's first and only release with Artery Recordings.

== Track listing ==
No.	Title	Length
1.	"Praeludium"	2:25
2.	"Double or Nothing"	3:12
3.	"Ravenous"	4:53
4.	"Déjà Vu All over Again"	3:34
5.	"Second Guessing"	3:24
6.	"Nevermore: contains hidden track Dancing Alone (starts after 2:30 of silence)"	13:25

== Personnel ==
- Dennis Lee - unclean vocals
- Shawn Milke - lead vocals, piano, rhythm guitar
- Patrick Thompson - lead guitar, backing vocals
- Jake Campbell - rhythm guitar, backing vocals, lead guitar
- Shane Crump - bass guitar, backing vocals
- Jeremy Bryan - drums

== Charts ==
Chart	Peak position
US Billboard 200	138
US Top Rock Albums	35
US Independent Albums	25

== Trivia ==
- The song "Second Guessing" has a different name "Almost Famous" and was changed at the last second.
- This is the second record with collaboration of guitarist Jake Campbell since his departure of the band in 2010, months later ending The Emptiness record and tour.
