= Eulalie =

1845 poem written by Edgar Allan Poe

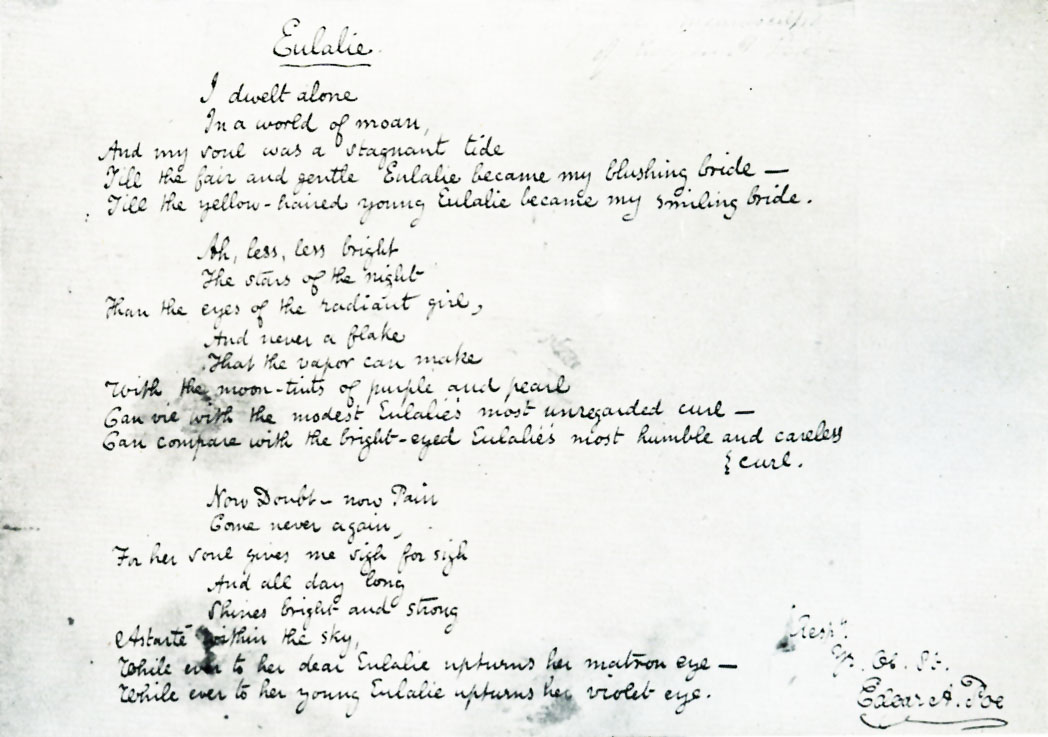
Original manuscript for "Eulalie" with Poe's signature

"Eulalie", or "Eulalie — A Song", is a poem by Edgar Allan Poe, first published in the July 1845 issue of The American Review and reprinted shortly thereafter in the August 9, 1845 issue of the Broadway Journal.

== Summary ==
The poem is a bridal song about a man who overcomes his sadness by marrying the beautiful Eulalie. The woman's love here has a transformative effect on the narrator, taking him from a "world of moan" to one of happiness.

== Analysis ==
The poem uses Poe's frequent theme of "the death of a beautiful woman," which he considered to be "the most poetical topic in the world." The use of this theme has often been suggested to be autobiographical by Poe critics and biographers, stemming from the repeated loss of women throughout Poe's life, including his mother Eliza Poe and his foster mother Frances Allan. If autobiographical, "Eulalie" may be referring to Poe's relationship with his wife Virginia. It seems to express that she lifted his spirits and washed away his feelings of loneliness. After Virginia's death in 1847, Poe scribbled on a manuscript copy of "Eulalie" a couplet, now known as "Deep in Earth". It is unclear if Poe intended this to be part of "Eulalie", an unfinished new poem, or just a personal note.

The name Eulalie emphasizes the letter "L", a frequent device in Poe's female characters such as "Annabel Lee", "Lenore", and "Ulalume".

== Publication history ==
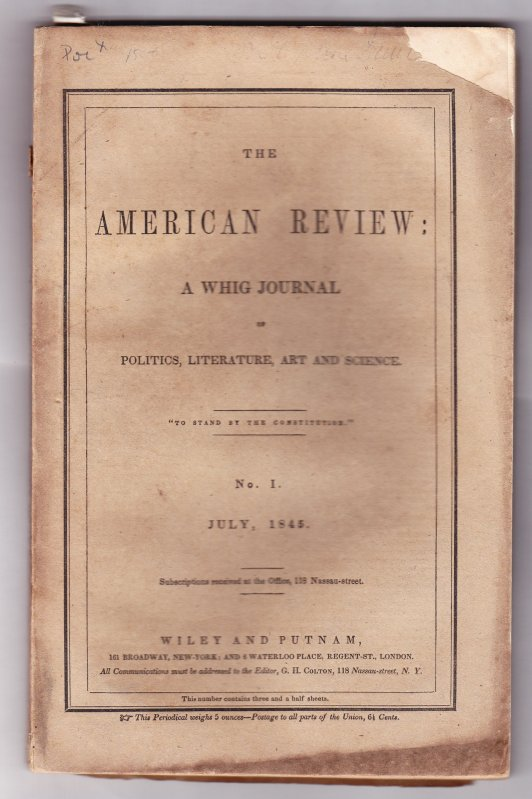
"Eulalie" appeared in The American Review, July, 1845, Wiley and Putnam, New York.

The poem was first published as "Eulalie — A Song" in the July 1845 issue of the American Review — it was the only new poem Poe published that year, other than "The Raven".

== See also ==
- "Bridal Ballad"
- "Ulalume"
- Poems by Edgar Allan Poe
