= On Frail Wings of Vanity and Wax =

2006 album by Alesana

Studio album by Alesana
- Released: June 6, 2006
- Length: 55:52
- Label: Tragic Hero; Fearless
- Producer: Kit Walters, Jamie King

Alesana chronology
Try This with Your Eyes Closed (2005)	On Frail Wings of Vanity and Wax (2006)	Where Myth Fades to Legend (2008)

On Frail Wings of Vanity and Wax is the debut studio album by post-hardcore band Alesana. It was originally released on June 6, 2006 by Tragic Hero Records. After the band joined Fearless Records, the album was re-released on March 20, 2007, with two bonus tracks and new cover art.

In 2006, they added guitarist/vocalist Adam "Huckleberry" Ferguson to their lineup. They followed with a full-length album, entitled On Frail Wings of Vanity and Wax, produced by Kit Walters, during the summer of 2006. In early 2008, On Frail Wings of Vanity and Wax charted on the Billboard magazine's Heatseekers chart, peaking at number 44.

== Lyrics and composition ==
The lyrics for the album's songs were written by Dennis Lee and Shawn Milke. Many of the songs were inspired by Greek mythology. For example, "Ambrosia" was based on the myth of King Midas and his golden touch, "Nero's Decay" was based on the fall of Rome, and "The Third Temptation of Paris" was based on the Trojan War.

== Releases ==
The album was initially released by the record label Tragic Hero Records on June 6, 2006. However, in late 2006, Alesana signed with the record label Fearless Records, re-releasing the album on March 20, 2007, and adding a two-song bonus track to the original track listing: "Early Mourning" and "Apology (Remix)." The re-released album also included a video of a live performance by Alesana in San Antonio, Texas, on December 8, 2006, performing four of its songs: "Apology," "Ambrosia," "Congratulations, I Hate You," and "Tilting the Hourglass"; and a video of the band being interviewed by NewBandTV.com.

== Track listing ==
On Frail Wings of Vanity and Wax
No.	Title	Length
1.	"Icarus"	1:00
2.	"Ambrosia"	3:04
3.	"Pathetic, Ordinary"	4:00
4.	"Alchemy Sounded Good at the Time"	4:14
5.	"Daggers Speak Louder Than Words"	3:27
6.	"Last Three Letters"	3:32
7.	"Apology"	5:18
8.	"Tilting the Hourglass"	3:48
9.	"This Conversation Is Over"	3:23
10.	"Congratulations, I Hate You"	4:02
11.	"The Third Temptation of Paris"	3:42
12.	"Siren's Soliloquy"	4:01
13.	"Nero's Decay"	4:23
Total length:		47:54

Reissue bonus tracks
No.	Title	Length
14.	"Early Mourning"	3:54
15.	"Apology (Acoustic)"	4:01
Total length:		55:52

== Personnel ==
Alesana

- Dennis Lee – unclean vocals
- Patrick Thompson – lead guitar and additional vocals (track 11)
- Steven Tomany – bass guitar
- Shawn Milke – clean and unclean vocals, rhythm guitar, keyboards, and piano
- Adam Ferguson – rhythm guitar and backing vocals
- Jeremy Bryan – drums

Additional personnel

- Rebecca Carter – vocals (track 1)
- Melissa Milke – vocals (tracks 2, 6, 10 & 11)
- Kit Walters – vocals (track 11)
