= Where Myth Fades to Legend =

Studio album by Alesana
- Released: June 3, 2008
- Genre: Post-hardcore; screamo; emo; metalcore
- Length: 51:10
- Label: Fearless, Defiance
- Producer: Steve Evetts

Alesana chronology
| On Frail Wings of Vanity and Wax (2006) | Where Myth Fades to Legend (2008) | The Emptiness (2010) |

Professional ratings
Review scores
| Source | Rating |
|---|---|
| AllMusic | 2.5/5 stars |
| AbsolutePunk | 46% |
| Music Reviewer | 7/10 |

Where Myth Fades to Legend is the second full-length studio album by Alesana, released through Fearless Records on June 3, 2008. The album was produced by Steve Evetts and recorded in Los Angeles, California.

The album's closing track "Obsession is Such an Ugly Word" features guest vocals from Craig Mabbitt of Escape the Fate.

As with their previous album, the majority of the songs are related to fables and the members' "favorite stories" compiled from The Brothers Grimm, except for "As You Wish", which is based on the story The Princess Bride, along with "This Is Usually The Part Where People Scream" which is based on the first season of the television series Heroes.

AllMusic gave the album a negative review, saying it contained "cookie-cutter" predictability in the screamo genre, "without the spark of personality or originality that might make them stand out from the crowd of equally unmemorable acts."

== Track listing ==
All songs written by Shawn Milke, Dennis Lee, and Patrick Thompson except where noted.

| No. | Title | Length |
|---|---|---|
| 1. | "This Is Usually the Part Where People Scream" (Milke, Adam Ferguson) | 3:48 |
| 2. | "Goodbye, Goodnight, for Good" | 3:15 |
| 3. | "Seduction" | 4:45 |
| 4. | "A Most Profound Quiet" (Milke, Ferguson) | 3:17 |
| 5. | "Red and Dying Evening" | 3:28 |
| 6. | "Better Luck Next Time, Prince Charming" | 3:20 |
| 7. | "The Uninvited Thirteenth" | 3:40 |
| 8. | "Sweetheart, You Are Sadly Mistaken" (Milke, Ferguson) | 5:26 |
| 9. | "And They Call This Tragedy" | 3:43 |
| 10. | "All Night Dance Parties In the Underground Palace" | 3:18 |
| 11. | "Endings Without Stories" | 4:01 |
| 12. | "As You Wish" | 3:26 |
| 13. | "Obsession Is Such an Ugly Word" | 5:58 |
| Total length: | | 51:10 |

Japanese version bonus track
| No. | Title | Length |
|---|---|---|
| 14. | "Beautiful In Blue" | 3:28 |
| Total length: | | 54:38 |

=== Enhanced Bonus Videos ===
- "Obsession Is Such An Ugly Word" (live)
- "This Is Usually the Part Where People Scream" (live)
- "The Uninvited Thirteenth" (live)
- "This Conversation Is Over" (live)
- "Making of the Album" (documentary]

== Allusions ==
Most of the songs on the album are based on The Brothers Grimm stories.

- According to vocalist and rhythm guitarist, Shawn Milke, "This Is Usually the Part Where People Scream" is influenced by the television show Heroes. When the series premiered, "Save the cheerleader, save the world" closed all the promotions for Heroes which is similar to "It's a chance to save the world or lose the girl. Let's save the world. Heroes will save the day."
- "Seduction" is based on The Maid Maleen, a tale about a girl who is trapped inside of a tower left with enough food to survive for only one year. When she finally escapes, she finds that her one true love is with another.
- "A Most Profound Quiet" is a variation on the story The Robber Bridegroom in which the bridegroom is torn between loving his future wife, or killing her.
- "Better Luck Next Time, Prince Charming" alludes to the tale of Snow White.
- "The Uninvited Thirteenth" is based on Sleeping Beauty.
- "Sweetheart, You are Sadly Mistaken" is an adaptation of Hansel and Gretel.
- "As You Wish" is about the novel/movie The Princess Bride, from the point of view of Westley.
- "Obsession Is Such an Ugly Word" is based on the Fitcher's Bird: in the tale, three sisters are captured by a wizard. One sister discovers that the other two have been slaughtered in a room that she has been given a key to, she is warned that she would pay if she opened the door.

== Chart positions ==
| Chart (2008) | Peak position |
|---|---|
| Billboard 200 | 96 |
| Billboard Independent Albums | 11 |
| Billboard Hard Rock Albums | 13 |

== Personnel ==
Alesana

- Dennis Lee – unclean vocals
- Shawn Milke – lead vocals, piano, rhythm guitar
- Patrick Thompson – lead guitar, vocals (on track 13)
- Adam Ferguson – rhythm guitar, backing vocals, lead guitar, classical guitar (piece after track 3)
- Jeremy Bryan – drums
- Shane Crump – bass guitar, backing unclean vocals

Additional musicians

- Melissa Milke – female vocals (on tracks 2, 4, 6, 8, and 12)

Production

- Steve Evetts – producer, engineering, mixing
- Alesana – additional production
- Alan Douches – mastering
