= A Night in the Lonesome October =

1993 science fiction novel by Roger Zelazny

- First edition (hardcover)
- Author: Roger Zelazny
- Illustrator: Gahan Wilson
- Language: English
- Genre: Fantasy
- Publisher: William Morrow and Company
- Publication date: 1993
- Publication place: United States
- Media type: Print (hardback and paperback)
- Pages: 280
- ISBN: 0-688-12508-5
- OCLC: 27640649
- Dewey Decimal: 813/.54 20
- LC Class: PS3576.E43 N5 1993

A Night in the Lonesome October is a novel by American writer Roger Zelazny published in 1993, near the end of his life. It was his final book, and one of his five personal favorites.

The book is divided into 32 chapters, each representing one "night" in the month of October (plus an "introductory" chapter). The story is told in the first person, like journal entries. Throughout the book, 33 full-page illustrations by Gahan Wilson punctuate a story that is heavily influenced by H. P. Lovecraft. (There is one illustration per chapter, in addition to one on the inside back cover.) The title is a line from Edgar Allan Poe's poem "Ulalume", and Zelazny thanks him as well as other writers—Mary Shelley, Bram Stoker, Sir Arthur Conan Doyle, Robert Bloch and Albert Payson Terhune—whose most famous characters appear in the book.

A Night in the Lonesome October was nominated for the Nebula Award for Best Novel in 1994. A similar theme, conflict around the opening of a gate to another world, appears in Zelazny's 1981 novel Madwand.

Presented as a diary from October 1 to 31, the book has inspired readers to follow its timeline by reading one entry per day until Halloween.

== Plot summary ==
A Night in the Lonesome October is narrated from the point-of-view of Snuff, a dog who is Jack the Ripper's companion. The bulk of the story takes place in London and its environs, though at one point the story detours through the dream-world described by Lovecraft in The Dream-Quest of Unknown Kadath. Though never explicitly stated, various contextual clues within the story (the most obvious of which is the appearance of Sherlock Holmes or "The Great Detective") imply that it takes place during the late Victorian period.

The story reveals that once every few decades when the moon is full on the night of Halloween (a very rare "Blue Moon", meaning the second full moon in that month), the fabric of reality thins, and doors may be opened between this world and the realm of the Great Old Ones. When these conditions are right, men and women with occult knowledge may gather at a specific ritual site to hold the doors closed, or to help fling them open. Should the Closers win, then the world will remain as it is until the next turning, but should the Openers succeed, then the Great Old Ones will come to Earth, to remake the world in their own image, enslaving or slaughtering the human race in the process. The Openers have never yet won. These meetings are often referred to as "The Game" or "The Great Game" by the participants, who try to keep the goings-on secret from the mundane population.

The various "Players" during the Game depicted in the book are archetypal characters from the Victorian Era gothic fiction – Jack the Ripper (only ever referred to as "Jack"), Dracula ("The Count"), and the Wolf Man (known as "Larry Talbot", the film character's name) all make appearances. In addition, there is a Witch ("Crazy Jill"), a Clergyman (Vicar Roberts), a Druid ("Owen"), Victor Frankenstein ("The Good Doctor"), Sherlock Holmes ("The Great Detective"), a "Mad Monk" ("Rastov" – apparently modeled after Rasputin), and grave robbers or Hermetic occultists ("Morris and McCab" – based on real-life grave robbers Burke and Hare.

Each Player has a familiar – an animal companion with near-human intelligence that helps complete the numerous preparations for the ritual. The majority of the story describes the interactions and discussions of these familiars, all from Snuff's point of view.

Throughout the book, the Players slowly take sides, form alliances, make deals, oppose one another, and even kill off their enemies. The plot accelerates until the night of October 31, when the rite takes place and the fate of the world is decided.
