= Confessions (Alesana album) =

The Annabel Trilogy Part III: Confessions

Studio album by Alesana
- Released: April 21, 2015, August 31, 2016 (The Annabel Trilogy Edition)
- Studios: Adelaide Studios, Raleigh, NC
- Genres: Post-hardcore; alternative rock; emo; metalcore; screamo
- Length: 56:53; 69:56 (re-release)
- Labels: Revival Recordings (ROW), Tragic Hero Records (EUR), Warner Music Group (CAN)
- Producers: Shawn Milke and Neil Engle

Alesana chronology
| The Decade (EP) (2014) | The Annabel Trilogy Part III: Confessions (2015) |

Singles from Confessions
- 1. "Oh, How The Mighty Have Fallen" Released: March 17, 2015; 2. "Comedy of Errors" Released: April 2, 2015; 3. "Fatal Optimist" Released: August 17, 2016

Confessions or The Annabel Trilogy Part III: Confessions (on Re-release edition) is the fifth studio album by American post-hardcore band, Alesana. It is their third concept album and the final chapter of the Annabel trilogy, released on April 21, 2015. The first one, The Emptiness (Fearless Records) was released in 2010, and the second one, A Place Where the Sun Is Silent (Epitaph Records) was released in 2011.

== Background ==
Alesana released a book titled "Annabel" on August 31. The short novel tells the story that the band's three concept albums are based around, including a special edition of Confessions with new artwork and two extra songs.

== Reception ==
Timothy Mongle of Allmusic wrote that Confessions "eschews traditional labels" and called the band's self-description of "sweetcore" a fusion of screamo with "highly theatrical alt-rock". The album debuted at number 47 on Billboard's Top Album Sales and 82 on the Billboard 200.

== Track listing ==
All lyrics written by Dennis Lee, Shawn Milke, and Patrick Thompson, all music composed by Alesana.

| No. | Title | Length |
|---|---|---|
| 1. | "It Was a Dark and Stormy Night" | 4:24 |
| 2. | "The Acolyte" | 3:52 |
| 3. | "Comedy of Errors" | 6:16 |
| 4. | "The Goddess" | 4:29 |
| 5. | "Oh, How the Mighty Have Fallen" | 5:42 |
| 6. | "The Puppeteer" | 7:22 |
| 7. | "Fatal Optimist" | 3:26 |
| 8. | "The Martyr" | 4:57 |
| 9. | "Paradox" | 4:55 |
| 10. | "Through the Eyes of Uriel" | 4:14 |
| 11. | "Catharsis" | 7:16 |
| Total length: | | 56:53 |

The Annabel Trilogy Edition
| No. | Title | Length |
|---|---|---|
| 1. | "Fatima Rusalka (feat. Josh Grosscup of Megosh)" | 6:51 |
| 2. | "It Was a Dark and Stormy Night" | 4:24 |
| 3. | "The Acolyte" | 3:52 |
| 4. | "Comedy of Errors" | 6:16 |
| 5. | "The Goddess" | 4:29 |
| 6. | "Oh, How the Mighty Have Fallen" | 5:42 |
| 7. | "The Puppeteer" | 7:22 |
| 8. | "Fatal Optimist" | 3:26 |
| 9. | "The Martyr" | 4:57 |
| 10. | "Paradox" | 4:55 |
| 11. | "Through the Eyes of Uriel" | 4:14 |
| 12. | "Catharsis" | 7:16 |
| 13. | "Ciao, Bella" | 6:11 |
| Total length: | | 1:09:56 |

== Personnel ==
- Dennis Lee – unclean vocals, lyrics
- Shawn Milke – lead vocals, piano, rhythm guitar
- Patrick Thompson – lead guitar, backing vocals
- Jake Campbell – rhythm guitar, backing vocals, lead guitar
- Shane Crump – bass, backing vocals
- Jeremy Bryan – drums

Additional musicians

- Melissa Milke – female vocals
- Daryl Gall – spoken word vocals
- Josh Grosscup – Additional vocals on "Fatima Rusalka"

Production

- Neil Engle and Shawn Milke – production

== Charts ==
| Chart (2015) | Peak position |
|---|---|
| US Billboard 200 | 82 |
| US Billboard Alternative Albums | 10 |
| US Billboard Hard Rock Albums | 3 |
| US Billboard Independent Albums | 7 |
| US Billboard Top Rock Albums | 12 |
| US Billboard Top Sales Album | 47 |
