= Lenore (poem) =

Poem written by Edgar Allan Poe

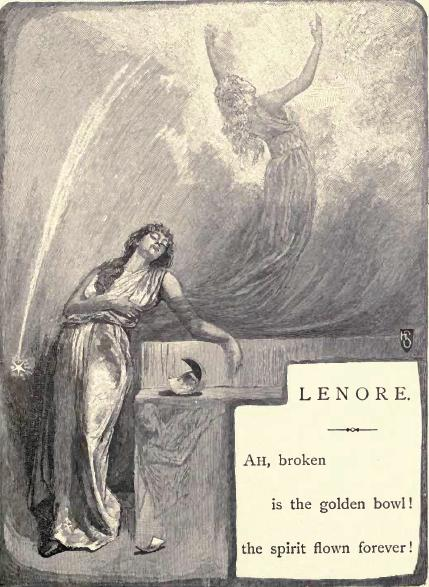
Illustration by Henry Sandham for an 1886 edition of the poem

"Lenore" is a poem by the American author Edgar Allan Poe. It began as a different poem, "A Paean", and was not published as "Lenore" until 1843.

== Analysis ==
The poem discusses proper decorum in the wake of the death of a young woman, described as "the queenliest dead that ever died so young". The poem concludes: "No dirge shall I upraise,/ But waft the angel on her flight with a paean of old days!" Lenore's fiancé, Guy de Vere, finds it inappropriate to "mourn" the dead; rather, one should celebrate their ascension to a new world. Unlike most of Poe's poems relating to dying women, "Lenore" implies the possibility of meeting in paradise.

The poem may have been Poe's way of dealing with the illness of his wife Virginia. The dead woman's name, however, may have been a reference to Poe's recently dead brother, William Henry Leonard Poe. Poetically, the name Lenore emphasizes the letter "L" sound, a frequent device in Poe's female characters including "Annabel Lee", "Eulalie", and "Ulalume".

== Major themes ==
- Death of a beautiful woman (see also "Annabel Lee", "Eulalie", "The Raven", "Ulalume"; in Poe's short stories, see also "Ligeia", Berenice", "Eleonora", "Morella").

== Publication history ==
The poem was first published as part of an early collection in 1831 under the title "A Pæan". This early version was only 11 quatrains and the lines were spoken by a bereaved husband. The name "Lenore" was not included; it was not added until it was published as "Lenore" in February 1843 in The Pioneer, a periodical published by the poet and critic James Russell Lowell. Poe was paid $10 for this publication. The poem had many revisions in Poe's lifetime. Its final form was published in the August 16, 1845, issue of the Broadway Journal while Poe was its editor.

The original version of the poem is so dissimilar from "Lenore" that it is often considered an entirely different poem. Both are usually collected separately in anthologies.

== Lenore in other works ==
- A character by the name of Lenore, thought to be a deceased wife, is central to Poe's poem "The Raven" (1845).
- Roman Dirge created a comic book series in 1998 inspired by the poem, involving the comedic misadventures of Lenore, the Cute Little Dead Girl.
- Hikaru Utada's 2004 song "Kremlin Dusk" makes a reference to Lenore, as well as other elements of Poe's works, and even mentions Poe himself.
