= Alesana =

American post-hardcore band

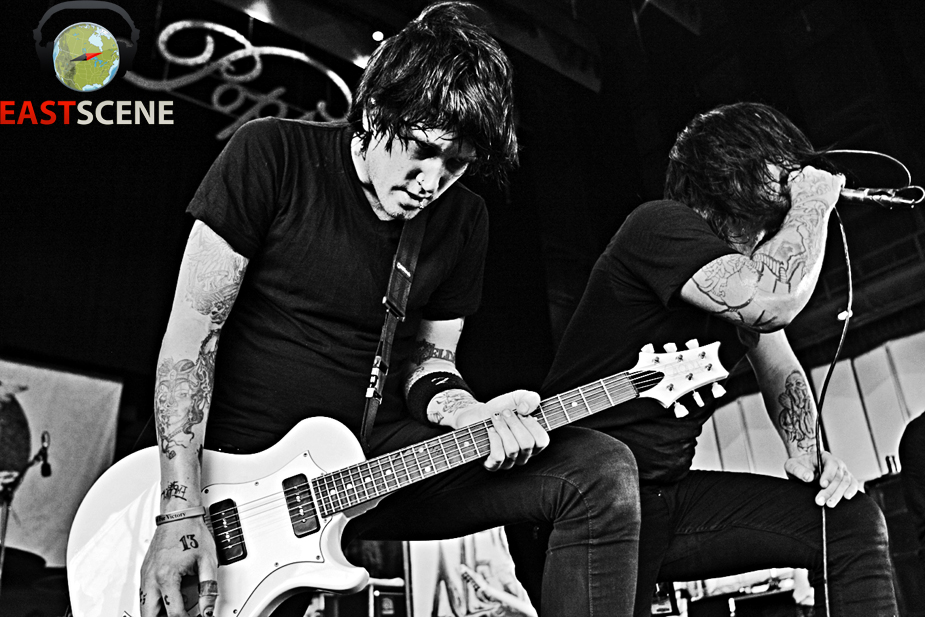
- Shawn Milke (left) and Dennis Lee in 2010

Background information
- Origin: Raleigh, North Carolina, U.S.
- Genres: Emo; post-hardcore; pop screamo; metalcore; screamo
- Years active: 2004–present
- Labels: Tragic Hero; Fearless; Epitaph; Revival Recordings; Artery
- Members: Shawn Milke; Dennis Lee; Patrick Thompson; Shane Crump; Jake Campbell
- Past members: Jeremy Bryan; Steven Tomany; Daniel Magnuson; Adam Ferguson; Alex Torres; Will Anderson
- Website: www.alesana.store

Alesana (/ˌælɪsˈænə/ AL-iss-AN-ə) is an American post-hardcore band from Raleigh, North Carolina. The group was founded by Shawn Milke, Dennis Lee, Patrick Thompson, Steven Tomany and Daniel Magnuson during the fall of 2004, and is currently signed to Revival Recordings and Artery Recordings. In total, Alesana has released five full-length studio albums and three EPs.

The band initially received underground attention shortly after the release of the debut On Frail Wings of Vanity and Wax, featuring a musical style influenced by pop, punk, metal and classic rock.

== History ==
=== Formation and Try This with Your Eyes Closed (2004–2005) ===
Shawn Milke and Patrick Thompson were both living in Baltimore, Maryland in the early 2000s where they both played in different bands. Milke was a member of the punk rock band The Legitimate Excuse, which formed in 2001. After a year into looking for members around the Baltimore area and writing/recording early demos under the de facto/prototype Alesana name, the pair decided it would be best to move to Raleigh, North Carolina and continue their search. Dennis Lee was invited to join as the band's vocalist after Milke had met him in a restaurant he was working at. Milke recalled, "he looked like a band guy". They were eventually joined by Steven Tomany and Daniel Magnuson. With these new members in place, Alesana officially formed in October 2004. The band had its first practice in an upscale car wash. The name of the band is inspired from Aliceanna St., which Shawn Milke and Patrick Thompson lived on when playing in Baltimore, MD. Aliceanna St. is located in Fells Point, a neighborhood in Baltimore.

Alesana was the first band to join Tragic Hero Records in 2005, and their three demo songs titled "Apology", "Beautiful in Blue" and "Goodbye, Goodnight for Good" were featured on the compilation All The Tragedy Money Can Buy. In May 2005 they released their debut EP, Try This With Your Eyes Closed. In the same year, founding drummer Daniel Magnuson was replaced by Will Anderson, who was soon replaced by Jeremy Bryan. Alesana then toured across the United States, including an appearance at the Cornerstone Christian music festival, despite them not being a Christian band.

=== On Frail Wings of Vanity and Wax (2006–2008) ===
In 2006, they added guitarist/vocalist Adam "Huckleberry" Ferguson to their lineup. They followed with a full-length album, entitled On Frail Wings of Vanity and Wax, produced by Kit Walters, during the summer of 2006. The album was their first foray into concept albums with most songs being based on Greek mythology. In late 2006 Alesana signed to Fearless Records, which re-released their LP in March 2007 and released a music video for "Ambrosia". In the same year, the song "Apology" in an acoustic version was featured on the compilation release, Punk Goes Acoustic 2. The group parted ways with Steven Tomany on the second to last day of tour followed by a break before playing the entire Warped Tour 2007. He was replaced by Shane Crump. The record is also the first to feature Shawn Milke's sister, Melissa Milke, who performs all female vocals.

In early 2008, On Frail Wings of Vanity and Wax charted on the Billboard magazine's Heatseekers chart, peaking at #44.

=== Where Myth Fades to Legend (2008–2009) ===
In 2008, Alesana finished recording their second album, Where Myth Fades to Legend. It was released on June 3, 2008, but was leaked on popular torrent sites a month beforehand. Where Myth Fades to Legend was also the title of their headlining tour with Sky Eats Airplane, Our Last Night, Lovehatehero, and The Chariot that supported the album.

On the 2008 Warped Tour, Shane Crump briefly left due to personal matters at home and Jake Campbell, formerly of Twelve Gauge Valentine, became a temporary fill in-bassist. Upon Crump's return, Adam Ferguson and the band parted ways and Campbell became the new guitarist/vocalist. Shane Crump also took care of all the backing unclean to this point.

On January 20, 2009, the music video for "Seduction", the song features a few screams made by Ferguson before he left the band, because of that Shane Crump lip sync all his screams. On March 10, 2009, the album Punk Goes Pop 2 was released which includes Alesana's cover of "What Goes Around...Comes Around" by Justin Timberlake. Alesana's Where Myth Fades to Legend has also charted on the Billboard 200 at #96.

=== The Emptiness (2009–2010) ===
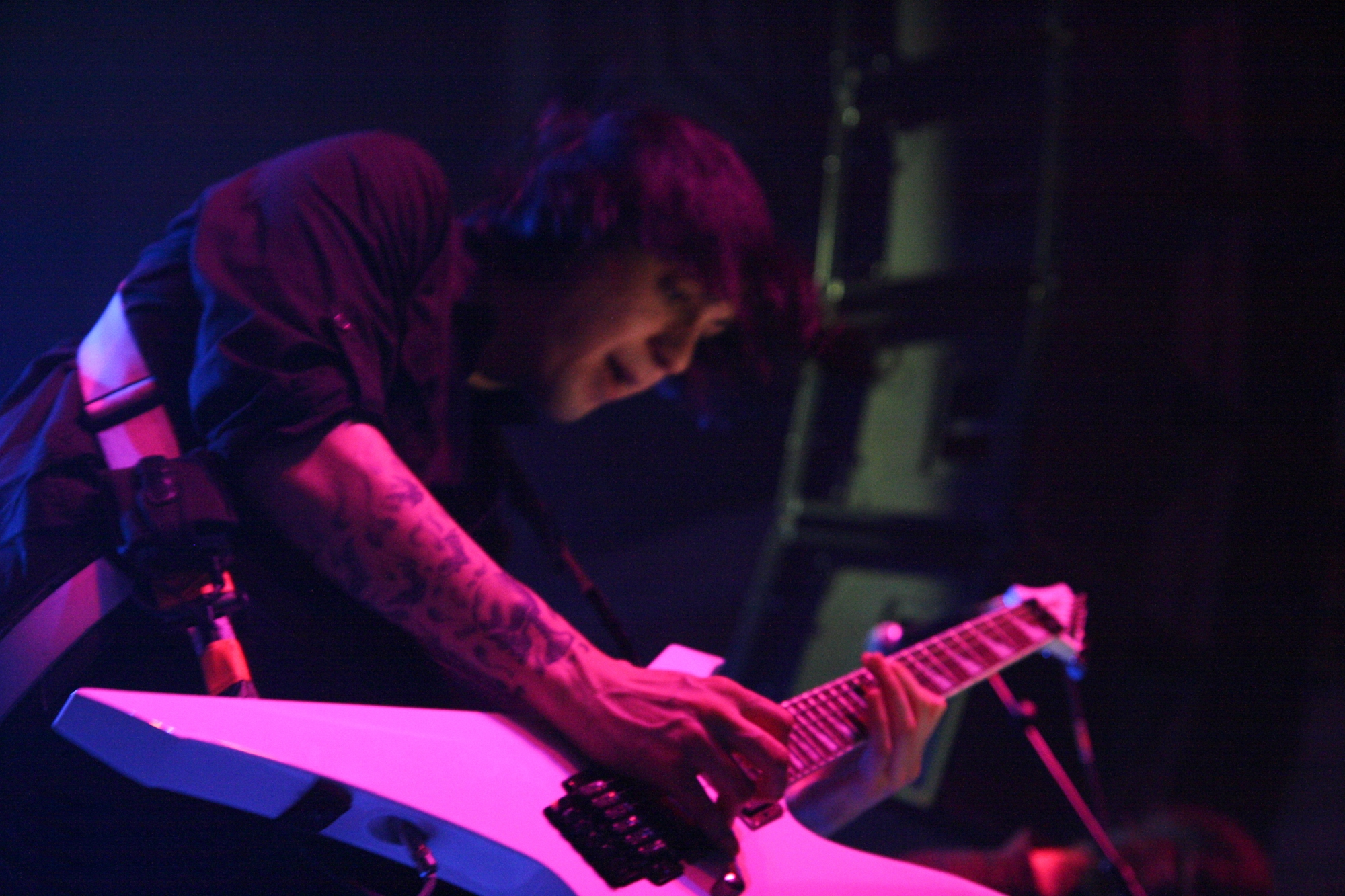
Former Greeley Estates guitarist Alex Torres joined Alesana in 2010, temporarily replacing Jake Cambell for 2 years until Campbell's eventual return in 2012.

In late February, Shawn Milke announced Alesana had started writing new material for their upcoming album. They began recording their third studio album, in July 2009, in Portland, Oregon, with producer Kris Crummett. The album, according to Shawn Milke on The Rave TV, would be entitled The Emptiness. The band had made their progress in the studio viewable to fans through a Twitter account and an official website run by the band themselves. Concluding the band's recording session, which began on July 10, Alesana then set out for North Carolina to rest before they began their Vs. tour, which they headlined and included the bands The Bled, Enter Shikari, Broadway, Madina Lake, and Asking Alexandria. On the Vs. tour, Alesana's set included two new songs titled "To Be Scared By An Owl" and "The Thespian". Soon after concluding their month-long Vs. tour, Alesana headlined the "You'd Be Way Cuter in a Coffin" Tour with From First to Last, Asking Alexandria, The Word Alive and Memphis May Fire.

On October 15, Milke and Lee held a second interview with The Rave, where they revealed that they were shooting a music video in the fall for one song from The Emptiness. Milke also revealed that the album, The Emptiness, was to be released on January 26, 2010. On November 23, Alesana released their first recorded work off of The Emptiness, "To Be Scared By An Owl" and began to promote it as a single. The same week, they entered the studio to begin filming their third video which according to their website, is "The Thespian", the song was released on December 8, 2009. In 2009, Alesana won the Best Hardcore/Screamo Band at the Rock on Request Awards. The band were also invited to play "To Be Scared by an Owl" live on The Daily Habit.

After the release of their music video for "The Thespian", the group embarked on a world tour featuring Europe, Japan and across the US, before returning home for the 2010 Vans Warped Tour. Right before their first venue on the Warped Tour, guitarist Jake Campbell left the band, and Alex Torres of Greeley Estates took his place. Upon the release of The Emptiness, it debuted at #68 on the Billboard 200, which made it the best selling release by the band during this period.

On July 22, 2010, Milke made a statement on the official Revolver website, regarding his constant desire to write scripts, stories and music; considering The Emptiness his 'first printed story'. Milke went on to say that he is constantly writing, and that new material for an Alesana album—as well as material for Wake Me Up, Juliet and Tempting Paris—was already being created. After The Emptiness's recording, the group announced a headlining tour entitled: Two Frail Weeks of Vanity and Wax, in which they performed On Frail Wings of Vanity and Wax in its entirety on each date of the tour, along with confirming that some songs would never be played live again after these concerts. In November 2010, Alesana departed from Fearless and signed to Epitaph Records.

=== A Place Where the Sun Is Silent (2011) ===
During the beginning of 2011, the band confirmed that plans for a new record were already in the works. Alesana stated that chosen VIP's were involved within the testing of new tracks that were prepared to be included on their fourth studio album. These trackings were recorded during March 2011 with producer Kris Crummett. By the beginning of that summer, Alesana completely finished the record's recording sessions. Alex Torres, Shane Crump, and Dennis Lee shortly thereafter confirmed that the mixing was finished as well and that they had the first master copies published. The name of the album was then announced to be titled, A Place Where the Sun Is Silent, and was released on October 18.

Before its release, promotion for the record was supported by many magazines, websites and other publications. August 24, 2011 had Alternative Press premiere the first leaked song from the album, entitled "A Gilded Masquerade". September 20 had Buzznet streaming "A Forbidden Dance" on their website as part of a contest for a lyric video.

The album thematizes Dante Alighieri's 14th-century epic poem, Inferno. On December 20, 2011, the song "Circle VII: Sins of the Lion" was voted the best song of 2011 by readers of Revolver.

=== Side projects, Decade EP, tour and Confessions (2012–2016) ===
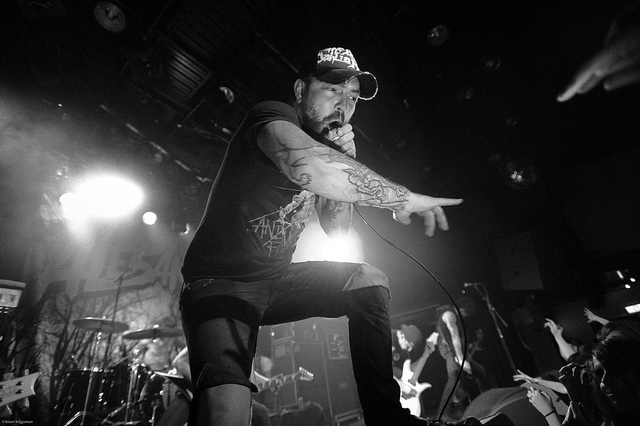
Vocalist Dennis Lee photographed in 2012.

In May 2012, Lee began a four-piece side band named Child of the Jackyl with members of the thrash metal band Vanisher while Milke released "Polaroids In July" with his side project Tempting Paris (consisting of Shawn Milke, Paul Co, Patrick Thompson, Melissa Milke and Joey Mitchell (Swampcandy)). Later, it was announced the band was parting ways with Alex Torres, shortly after Jake Campbell returned to the band. On May 8 Milke announced that the band had left Epitaph Records and the follow-up to A Place Where the Sun Is Silent would be self-released.

Alesana started 2014 signing with Artery Recordings and setting the release of a new EP, The Decade. It was released on April and a supporting tour had begun the month before. In September, they went on tour with Megosh. The Funeral Portrait and The Things They Carried also performed on some dates. Around that time, the band had intended to release their first live album. A performance on December 11 in their hometown with cheap tickets was recorded for the album, but the files from the performance were corrupted and the plans were scrapped.

In 2015, the band embarked on a nationwide tour with Capture The Crown, The Browning, Conquer Divide, and Revival Recordings labelmates The Funeral Portrait.

The band's fifth album Confessions was released on April 21, 2015. The following month, they announced a European tour in support of the album, which took place from August to September.

In October, they embarked on a US tour with 18 dates accompanied by iwrestledabearonce, Entheos, Artifex Pereo and Cabaret Runaway.

On December 30, 2015, via Revival Recordings YouTube channel, the band released the trailer for the first part of "Comedy of Errors" which premiered on January 7, 2016. On February 7, 2016, the second part was released.

On July 26, 2016, the page www.theannabeltrilogy.com was officially released along with the announcement of a new tour and that the band would be releasing a new novel entitled "Annabel," which is based on the group's three concept albums. The book was released on August 31, 2016, along with a new Deluxe Edition of Confessions with two extra songs, "Fatima Rusalka" and "Ciao Bella" Also, the band embarked on a 10-year tour for their debut album, On Frail Wings of Vanity and Wax, during the fall. This tour was entitled "10 Frail Years of Vanity and Wax", and supporting acts included Oh, Sleeper, Famous Last Words, and Artwork

On July 27, 2016, the band made official their participation on the second edition of Slipknot's Knotfest in Mexico with bands such; Avenged Sevenfold, Slipknot, Slayer, Animals as Leaders, Enter Shikari, Disturbed, Deftones and many more.

=== Origins, The Lost Chapters EP and future plans (2017–present) ===
On April 11, 2017, the band made official their participation on the first edition of the Vans Warped Tour MX with bands including Good Charlotte, Mayday Parade, Suicide Silence, Hatebreed, Never Shout Never and more. The Vans Warped Tour MX would have taken place in the Foro Pegaso in Toluca, Mexico, on May 27, 2017, although this date was pushed back for an intended show on October 22 of the same year before eventually being canceled by the promoters. They eventually did play in Mexico City at the Teatro Ramiro Jiménez on September 16, 2017, along with national groups Allison, Cerberus, Kamikaze Ninja, Say Ocean and Kaizan opening the show.

On October 31, 2017, the band announced a new project titled "Origins". Origins is a compilation of the band's history, scheduled for release on Black Friday, 2017. On November 22, 2017, the band released the first single off of the upcoming The Lost Chapters EP, titled "Fits and Starts", along with a music video which was a compilation of fan made videos sent to the band.

As of 2024, Alesana is touring regularly and playing festivals, and have confirmed there are no plans to stop doing so. Although they have admittedly taken a step back, mostly due to families and other obligations. The band appears to be more active on social media and have launched a new online merch store, with all apparel printed by Lee. Alesana has confirmed that a new album is in its early stages. Dennis Lee and his wife Cayce had a daughter in late 2020, with Lee later revealing that she had been born 4 months early and spent 9 months in the hospital, contributing to touring and writing delays. However 2024 showed a return to International dates with tours in Mexico, South America, Thailand, Indonesia and Hawaii. As well as playing Welcome to Welcome to Rockville in Daytona Beach, Florida. In November 2024, longtime drummer Jeremy Bryan stepped down amid sexual misconduct allegations. Joey DiBiase of the band’s Limbs, and Jasta (featuring Jamey Jasta, the vocalist of Hatebreed) is filling in as a touring drummer. 2025, and early 2026 the band returned to Japan with Escape the Fate and again to Mexico and South America.

In July 2025, Dennis Lee was a guest DJ at a "throwback emo night" event at the House of Whiskey in Laredo, Texas.

== Musical style and influences ==
Alesana's musical style has been described as "eschewing traditional labels" with its impenitent fusion of influences spanning numerous genres. Alesana's traditional sound combines various elements of post-hardcore, heavy metal and pop by utilizing harmonized guitar riffs, loud-soft dynamics, "uplifting" choruses, and "crushing" breakdowns".

Critics have labelled Alesana as emo, screamo, pop screamo, post-hardcore, and metalcore. On later releases, the band began incorporating symphonic elements such as horns, strings, and choral elements into their densely-layered sound. The band describes itself as a "sweetcore" band.

Vocalist and guitarist Shawn Milke sings in an extremely high-pitched voice. New Noise Magazine described his voice as "almost disturbingly female-like." Milke is a self-described "pop-punk kid" while lead vocalist Dennis Lee is a "total metalhead". In an early interview, Milke stated that instead of attempting to fuse the two styles, the band "sandwiched them together and just did them both". Lee added that the style was "a little awkward at first, but somehow, kids apparently liked it". The band has cited an array of rock and metal bands, such as The Beatles, Mae, Mew, The Smashing Pumpkins, The Black Dahlia Murder, Prayer for Cleansing and Between the Buried and Me.

== Band members ==
Current

- Shawn Milke – clean and unclean vocals, rhythm guitar, piano (2004–present)
- Dennis Lee – unclean vocals (2004–present)
- Patrick Thompson – lead guitar, backing vocals (2004–present)
- Shane Crump – bass, backing unclean vocals (2007–present)
- Jake Campbell – rhythm and lead guitar, backing vocals (2008–2010, 2012–present)

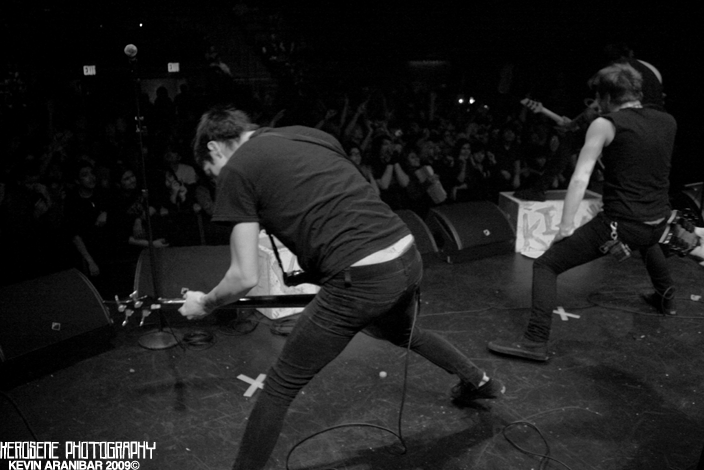
Alesana features a three-guitarist lineup.

Former

- Jeremy Bryan – drums (2006–2024)
- Steven Tomany – bass (2004–2007)
- Daniel Magnuson – drums (2004–2005)
- Adam Ferguson – rhythm guitar, backing unclean and clean vocals (2006–2008)
- Alex Torres – rhythm and lead guitar, backing vocals (2010–2012)
- Will Anderson – drums (2005–2006)

Touring

- Joey DiBiase – drums (2024–present)

Session

- Melissa Milke – vocals (2006–present)

Timeline

== Discography ==
=== Studio albums ===
- On Frail Wings of Vanity and Wax (2006)
- Where Myth Fades to Legend (2008)
- The Emptiness (2010)
- A Place Where the Sun Is Silent (2011)
- Confessions (2015)

=== EPs ===
Released in 2005, Try This With Your Eyes Closed was the bands first EP released via Tragic Hero Records and self produced by the band.

A remastered version of the record was released in 2008, also containing two of the bands recordings from a label sampler. The re-release was mixed and mastered by Jamie King.

Try This With Your Eyes Closed
| No. | Title | Length |
|---|---|---|
| 1. | "Apology" | 4:10 |
| 2. | "Endings Without Stories" | 3:43 |
| 3. | "Any They Call This Tragedy" | 4:29 |
| 4. | "Not A Single Word About This" | 3:30 |
| 5. | "Red And Dying Evening" | 3:30 |
| 6. | "Congratulations, I Hate You" | 3:57 |
| 7. | "Early Morning" | 3:46 |
| 8. | "Goodbye, Goodnight, For Good" | 3:38 |
| 9. | "Beautiful In Blue" | 3:17 |
| Total length: | | 33:28 |

- The Decade EP (2014)

Released in 2017, The Lost Chapters is the last EP released via Revival Recordings and self produced by the band.

The Lost Chapters
| No. | Title | Length |
|---|---|---|
| 1. | "Madeline" | 4:56 |
| 2. | "Adagio For Catastrophe" | 2:40 |
| 3. | "The Coward" | 3:42 |
| 4. | "Requiem" | 4:08 |
| 5. | "Fits And Starts" | 4:10 |
| 6. | "Interval (Hiatus Reborn)" | 7:28 |
| Total length: | | 27:04 |

Other songs

- "What Goes Around... Comes Around" (Justin Timberlake cover) (2009) – Punk Goes Pop 2
- "Fatima Rusalka" (2013) – Non-album song
- "Hiatus" (2016) – It's All Acoustic (Revival Recordings' compilation album)
- "Dancing Alone" (2016) – It's All Acoustic (Revival Recordings' compilation album)

== Videography ==
| Year | Title | From the album | Director |
|---|---|---|---|
| 2007 | "Ambrosia" "Ambrosia" (director's cut) | On Frail Wings of Vanity and Wax | Jeremy Jackson |
| 2008 | "Seduction" | Where Myth Fades to Legend | Scott Hansen |
| 2010 | "The Thespian" | The Emptiness | Stephen Penta |
| 2011 | "Circle VII: Sins of the Lion" | A Place Where the Sun Is Silent | Shawn Milke |
| 2011 | "Lullaby of the Crucified" | A Place Where the Sun Is Silent | Stephen Penta |
| 2014 | "Fatima Rusalka" | Non-album Single/Confessions (on 2016 re-release edition) | Rita Amal Baghdadi |
| 2014 | "Nevermore" | The Decade EP | Cole Dabney |
| 2015 | "Oh How The Mighty Have Fallen" | Confessions | Justin Reich |
| 2016 | "Comedy of Errors" (Part 1) | Confessions | Justin Reich |
| 2016 | "Comedy of Errors" (Part 2) | Confessions | Justin Reich |
| 2017 | "Fits and Starts" | The Lost Chapters EP | Shawn Milke |
