= The Emptiness (album) =

Studio album by Alesana
- Released: January 26, 2010
- Recorded: Fall 2009 Orion Studios, Baltimore; Portland, Oregon
- Genres: Post-hardcore; metalcore; symphonic rock; emo; screamo
- Length: 49:59
- Label: Fearless
- Producer: Kris Crummett

Alesana chronology
Where Myth Fades to Legend (2008)	The Emptiness (2010)	A Place Where the Sun Is Silent (2011)

Singles from The Emptiness
- 1. "To Be Scared by an Owl" Released: November 23, 2009; 2. "The Thespian" Released: December 8, 2009

The Emptiness is the third studio album by American metalcore band Alesana. It was recorded in the fall of 2009 and was released on January 26, 2010 through Fearless Records. The album is considered a rock opera due to its in-depth story. Vocalists Shawn Milke and Dennis Lee have both stated that the idea of writing an album based upon their own authored story has been present with them since the time of the band's first release, Try This with Your Eyes Closed.

Before the release of A Place Where the Sun Is Silent, The Emptiness was Alesana's best-selling album at the time, claiming the 68th position on the Billboard chart upon its release.

== Background and recording ==
Guitarists Shawn Milke and Patrick Thompson began the album's writing process by spending six weeks working "around the clock" on the rough versions of the album's tracks.

Although the previous albums have references to mythology of various cultures, The Emptiness is the band's first concept album. While touring in Europe, Shawn Milke and Dennis Lee decided to create a horror theme for their third album as well as using Edgar Allan Poe as an influence for their work—more specifically, the poem "Annabel Lee". Faint references are also made in the liner notes to "The Tell-Tale Heart" and "The Cask of Amontillado" in that it describes a body hidden under the bricks in the main character's basement, in comparison to the heart under the floorboards and the man behind the brick wall. In an interview, Milke included Stephen King, David Lynch, and the film Friday the 13th as further influences for the story. Milke claims he and co-lead vocalist Dennis Lee spent almost one year developing the album's concept.

The album's strings sections were composed by Milke and were performed by members of Portland Muse Chamber Ensemble. Milke recalled the experience as "a dream come true"

== Release and promotion ==
The Emptiness is the first work by Alesana to have official singles: "To Be Scared by an Owl" and "The Thespian". On November 23, after showing teaser versions of the song, the band digitally sold "To Be Scared by an Owl" on their website. The second single "The Thespian" was released two weeks later in the same fashion, shortly after the filming of its music video. "The Thespian" was released shortly afterward, on December 8. A music video for "The Thespian" was filmed during the winter of 2009 and was released on March 17, 2010.

The Emptiness became available for pre-order on iTunes on January 14 and the full album was leaked on January 21, five days before it released. It debuted at #68 on the Billboard 200 chart.

The track listing and album artwork was released on a bulletin from Fearless Records on punknews.org, and a news post on their official site. Their tour name "You'd be Way Cuter in a Coffin" was originally the title for their first track. Two string quartet compositions by Shawn Milke ("Interlude 3" and "Interlude 4") appear after tracks 6 and 10 and are available for individual purchase on iTunes.

== Musical style ==
According to guitarist Shawn Milke, The Emptiness combines the "dynamics of our earlier work with the raw energy of our last record".

== Reception ==
Professional ratings
Review scores
Source	Rating
AllMusic	3.5/5 stars
Rock Sound	7/10
Under the Gun Review	7/10

== Track listing ==
All lyrics written by Shawn Milke, Dennis Lee, and Patrick Thompson except where noted, all music composed by Alesana.

No.	Title	Length
1.	"Curse of the Virgin Canvas"	4:49
2.	"The Artist" (Milke, Jake Campbell)	3:46
3.	"A Lunatic’s Lament"	4:05
4.	"The Murderer" (Milke, Adam Fisher)	4:33
5.	"Hymn for the Shameless"	5:38
6.	"The Thespian"	4:41
7.	"Heavy Hangs the Albatross"	3:51
8.	"The Lover"	3:25
9.	"In Her Tomb by the Sounding Sea"	3:41
10.	"To Be Scared by an Owl" (Milke, Campbell, Jeremy Bryan)	4:10
11.	"Annabel"	7:20
Total length:		49:50

Digital Editions
No.	Title	Length
1.	"Curse of the Virgin Canvas"	4:49
2.	"The Artist" (Milke, Jake Campbell)	3:46
3.	"A Lunatic’s Lament"	4:05
4.	"The Murderer" (Milke, Adam Fisher)	4:33
5.	"Hymn for the Shameless"	5:38
6.	"The Thespian"	3:57
7.	"Interlude 3"	0:46
8.	"Heavy Hangs the Albatross"	3:51
9.	"The Lover"	3:25
10.	"In Her Tomb by the Sounding Sea"	3:41
11.	"To Be Scared by an Owl" (Milke, Campbell, Jeremy Bryan)	3:10
12.	"Interlude 4"	1:02
13.	"Annabel"	7:20
Total length:		51:47

== Personnel ==
Alesana

- Dennis Lee – unclean vocals
- Shawn Milke – lead vocals, piano, rhythm guitar
- Patrick Thompson – lead guitar, backing vocals
- Jake Campbell – rhythm guitar, backing vocals, lead guitar
- Shane Crump – bass, backing vocals
- Jeremy Bryan – drums

Additional musicians

- Melissa Milke – female vocals
- Adam Fisher – spoken word vocals
- Julie Coleman – violin
- Wendy Goodwin – violin
- Nelly Kovalev – viola
- Ashley Peck – cello

Production

- Kris Crummett – producer
- Pat Perry – production designer
- Neil Engle – production assistant
- Toby Fraser – design
- Alan Douches – mastering
