= Laura Farabough =

American performance artist and director (1949–2022)

Laura Farabough (24 July 1949 – 2022) was an American performance artist and director.

== Life and work ==
Farabough grew up in Los Angeles and dropped out of school when she was 16; she first sought the company of visual artists, then theater. She worked mainly in California.

She founded Snake Theater, a performance group, together with Christopher Hardman in Sausalito, California in the mid-1970s. Toured with Fool Asleep in 1974, at various colleges in California. Farabough's work was site-specific in many cases, such as Somewhere in the Pacific (1977) and Surface Tension (1981). The first piece was for Cronkhite Beach and the second for swimming pools. Hardman and Farabough toured Mexico with a Spanish translation of two of their pieces in 1976. The trip, which Farabough later described as a sort of "pilgrimage," increased their interest in aspects of religion and ritual (Bell 60). Other works were performed in beauty parlors, locker rooms, abandoned gas stations, and theaters. Her work was an early example of multimedia productions using recorded video and audio.

The Sausalito location was central to her work with Hardmann; they produced several performances a year. A community developed with them on the waterfront and in houseboats (Bell 60). A later group (still active today) to emerge from Snake was Antenna Theater; both were pioneers in the Bay Area of site-specific performance with productions such as Auto, Her Building, and Somewhere in the Pacific. In 1972, Farabough and her colleagues had dreamt of realizing their ideal project one day: "to create the Divine Comedy as an amusement park, complete with tour guides and animated circles of hell."

In 1981, the Bay Guardian reviewed her piece Surface Tension, which was performed at Strawberry Canyon Pool, on the UC Berkeley Campus and at the UCSF Pool.

She was featured, alongside Spalding Gray, on the cover of Artweek in 1982 for her piece Obedience School at the Magic Theater in San Francisco. The critic noted the characteristic "highly stylized, mechanically hypnotic live action." Theater scholar Jim Carmody noted that her pieces are like "aesthetic and intellectual puzzles" which almost always include combinations of live and recorded sounds and images (Carmody 246). Another major element is her use of "documentary voice" (Carmody 247).

The Hanson Gallery in Sausalito featured Farabough's site–specific video installation Santa Dog in 1988; one of her drawings was later featured in Smithsonian Magazine.

Femme Fatale, staged in 1981, is about Greta Garbo and Mata Hari; Garbo had played Hari in a 1926 film. The Los Angeles Times critic asked, "Is this theater? Or a Salvador Dali nightmare? Both." Farabough painted the sets. It was the first play that Farabough thought could be directed by another person.

While she was devoted to multimedia work with state-of-the-art technology, she considered the complexities of narrative and presence to be more important than the latest equipment: "What is phenomenally effective," she wrote after decades of experience in 2005, "is usually subtle and minimal rather than hyperextended and technologically elaborate."

In the 1990s, she enrolled in the doctoral program at Stanford University's Drama Department and staged several productions there, among them Real Original Thinker.

== Secondary sources ==
- Phaedre Bell. "Laura Farabough." Twentieth-century American dramatists, edited by Christopher J. Wheatley, 2000, pp. 59–66.
- Jim Carmody. “Poets of Bohemia and Suburbia: The Post-Literary Dramaturgies of Farabough. Harrington, and Shank." Contemporary American Theatre, edited by Bruce King (New York: St. Martin's Press, 1991), pp. 245–261.
- Trevor R. Griffiths and Carole Woddis. "Laura Farabough." The Back Stage theater guide: a theatergoer's companion to the world's best plays and playwrights (Bloomsbury, 1988; Back Stage Books, 1991).
- Theodore Shank. American Alternative Theatre (New York: Grove, 1982), pp. 113–122.
- Theodore Shank. “Laura Farabough and Chris Hardman: Background," California Performance, 1 (1989): 106–111.
- Theodore Shank. “Laura Farabough: Story, Characters, and Ideas Nightfire Theatre,” California Performance, 1 (1989): 112–155.

== Interviews ==
- “Laura Farabough.” In Interviews with Contemporary Women Playwrights, edited by Kathleen Betsko and Rachel Koenig (New York: Beech Tree Books, 1987), pp. 139–153.
- Theodore Shank: Interview with Laura Farabough. California Performance 1 (1989): 118–155.
