= Ulalume =

Poem by Edgar Allan Poe

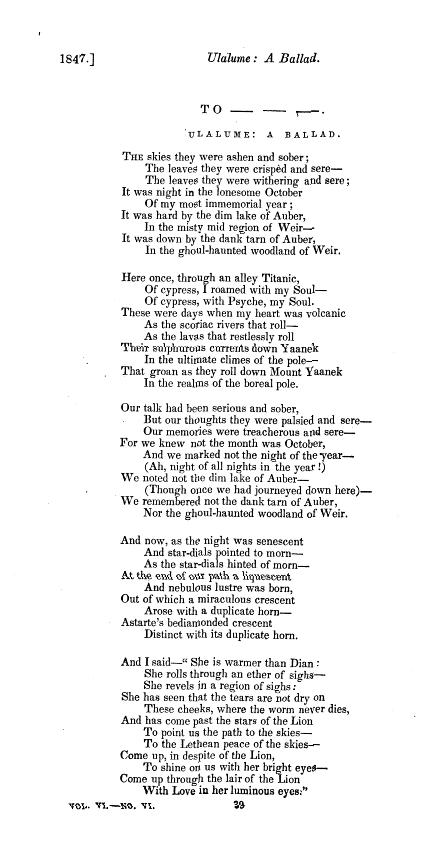
The first page of Ulalume, as the poem first appeared in the American Review in 1847

"Ulalume" (/ˈuːləluːm/) is a poem written by Edgar Allan Poe in 1847. Much like a few of Poe's other poems (such as "The Raven", "Annabel Lee", and "Lenore"), "Ulalume" focuses on the narrator's loss of his beloved due to her death. Poe originally wrote the poem as an elocution piece and, as such, the poem is known for its focus on sound. Additionally, it makes many allusions, especially to mythology, and the identity of Ulalume herself, if a real person, has been a subject of debate.

== Overview ==
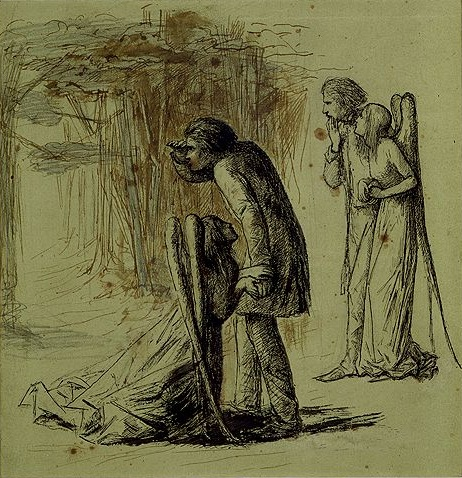
"Ulalume" as illustrated by Dante Gabriel Rossetti, circa 1847–1848.

The poem takes place on a night in the "lonesome October" with a gray sky as the leaves are withering for the autumn season. In the region of Weir, by the lake of Auber, the narrator roams with a "volcanic" heart. He has a "serious and sober" talk with his soul, though he does not realize it is October or where his roaming is leading him. He remarks on the stars as night fades away, remarking on the brightest one, and wonders if it knows that the tears on his cheeks have not yet dried. His soul, however, mistrusts the star and where it is leading them. Just as the narrator calms his soul, he realizes he has unconsciously walked to the vault of his "lost Ulalume" on the very night he had buried her a year before.

== Analysis ==
Unlike Poe's poem "Annabel Lee", this poem presents a narrator who is not conscious of his return to the grave of his lost love. This reveals the speaker's dependence on Ulalume and her love; his losing her leaves him not only sad but absolutely devastated and, by visiting her grave, he unconsciously subjects himself to further self-inflicted anguish. The poem has a heavy focus on decay and deterioration: the leaves are "withering" and the narrator's thoughts are "palsied". Like many of Poe's later poems, "Ulalume" has a strong sense of rhythm and musicality. The verses are purposefully sonorous, built around sound to create feelings of sadness and anguish. The poem employs Poe's typical theme of the "death of a beautiful woman", which he considered "the most poetical topic in the world". Biographers and critics have often suggested that Poe's obsession with this theme stems from the repeated loss of women throughout his life, including his mother Eliza Poe, his wife, and his foster mother Frances Allan.

The identity of Ulalume in the poem is uncertain. Poe scholar and distant relative Harry Lee Poe says it is autobiographical and shows Poe's grief over the recent death of his wife Virginia. Scholar Scott Peeples notes that "Ulalume" serves as a sequel to "The Raven". Poetically, the name Ulalume emphasizes the letter L, a frequent device in Poe's female characters such as "Annabel Lee", "Eulalie", and "Lenore". If it really stands for a deceased love, Poe's choosing to refer to Ulalume as "the thing" and "the secret" do not seem endearing terms. In one possible view, Ulalume may be representative of death itself.

=== Allusions ===
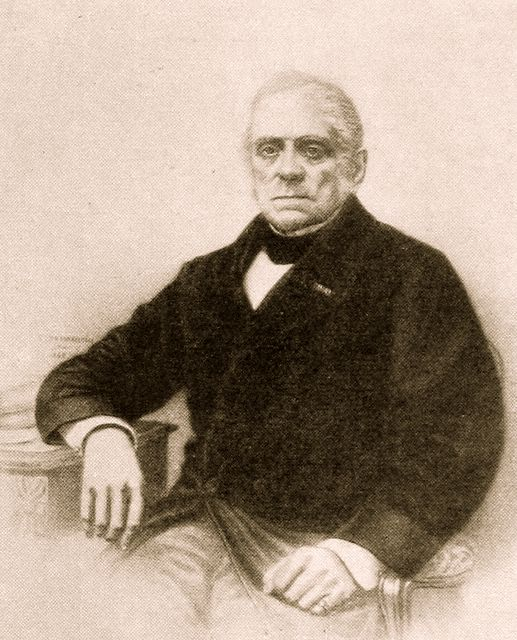
The "dim lake of Auber" may be a reference to composer Daniel François Esprit Auber.

Much work has been done by scholars to identify all of Poe's allusions, most notably by Thomas Ollive Mabbott, though other scholars suggest that the names throughout the poem should be valued only because of their poetic sounds. The title itself suggests wailing (from the Latin ululare). The name may also allude to the Latin lumen, a light symbolizing sorrow. The narrator personifies his soul as the ancient Greek Psyche, representing the irrational but careful part of his subconsciousness. It is Psyche who first feels concerned about where they are walking and makes the first recognition that they have reached Ulalume's vault.

The bright star they see is Astarte, a goddess associated with Venus and connected with fertility and sexuality. The "sinfully scintillant planet" in the original final verse is another reference to Venus. Astarte may represent a sexual temptress or a vision of the ideal. Mount Yaanek, with its "sulphurous currents" in the "ultimate climes of the pole", has been associated with Mount Erebus, a volcano in Antarctica first sighted in 1841, although Yaanek's location is specified as being in "the realms of the boreal pole", indicating an Arctic location rather than an Antarctic one for the fictional counterpart. The Auber and Weir references in the poem may be to two contemporaries of Poe: Daniel François Esprit Auber, a composer of sad operatic tunes, and Robert Walter Weir, a painter of the Hudson River School famous for his landscapes.

== Publication history ==
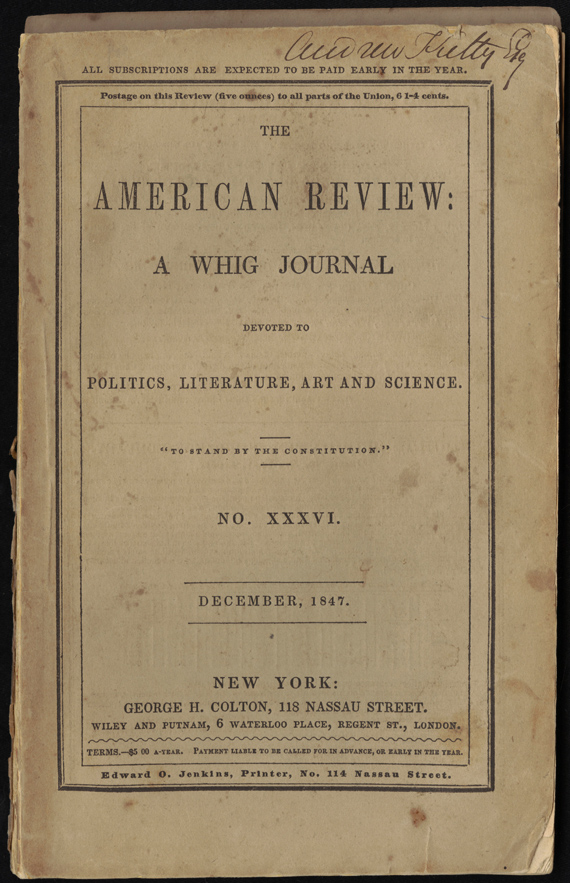
The cover of The American Review, December, 1847, No. 36, George H. Colton, New York.

Poe wrote the poem on the request of Reverend Cotesworth Bronson, who had asked Poe for a poem he could read at one of his lectures on public speaking. He asked Poe for something with "vocal variety and expression". Bronson decided not to use the poem Poe sent him, "Ulalume". Poe then submitted the poem to Sartain's Union Magazine, which rejected it as too dense. Poe probably saw Bronson's request as a personal challenge as well as an opportunity to enhance his renown, especially after his previous poem "The Raven" had also been demonstrated for its elocution style.

"Ulalume - A Ballad" was finally published, albeit anonymously, in the American Whig Review in December, 1847. Originally, Poe had sold his essay "The Rationale of Verse", then unpublished, to the Review's editor George Hooker Colton. Colton did not immediately print the manuscript, so Poe exchanged it for "Ulalume".

It was reprinted by Nathaniel Parker Willis, still anonymously, in the Home Journal with a note asking who the author was, on Poe's request, to stir up interest. Some, including Evert Augustus Duyckinck, presumed that the poem's author was Willis. The initial publication had 10 stanzas. Poe's literary executor Rufus Wilmot Griswold was the first to print "Ulalume" without its final stanza, now the standard version. Poe himself once recited the poem with the final stanza, but admitted it was not intelligible and that it was scarcely clear to himself.

== Critical response ==
Aldous Huxley, in his essay "Vulgarity in Literature", calls "Ulalume" "a carapace of jewelled sound", implying it lacks substance. Huxley uses the poem as an example of Poe's poetry being "too poetical", equivalent to wearing a diamond ring on every finger. Poet Daniel Hoffman says the reader must "surrender his own will" to the "hypnotic spell" of the poem and its "meter of mechanical precision". "Reading 'Ulalume' is like making a meal of marzipan", he says. "There may be nourishment in it but the senses are deadened by the taste, and the aftertaste gives one a pain in the stomach".

The poem did, however, receive some praise. An early 20th-century edition of Encyclopædia Britannica noted how the sound in "Ulalume" was successful. It said the "monotonous reiterations [of] 'Ulalume' properly intoned would produce something like the same effect upon a listener knowing no word of English that it produces on us." George Gilfillan remarked in the London Critic:

These, to many, will appear only words; but what wondrous words! What a spell they wield! What a weird unity is in them! The instant they are uttered, a misty picture, with a tarn, dark as a murderer's eye, below, and the thin yellow leaves of October fluttering above, exponents of a misery which scorns the name of sorrow, is hung up in the chambers of your soul forever.

After Poe's death, Thomas Holley Chivers claimed "Ulalume" was plagiarized from one of his poems. Chivers made several similar unfounded accusations against Poe. Even so, he said the poem was "nector mixed with ambrosia". Another friend of Poe, Henry B. Hirst, suggested in the January 22, 1848, issue of the Saturday Courier that Poe had found the "leading idea" of the poem in a work by Thomas Buchanan Read.

Bret Harte composed a parody of the poem entitled "The Willows" featuring the narrator, in the company of a woman called Mary, running out of credit at a bar:

And I said 'What is written, sweet sister,
At the opposite side of the room?'
She sobbed, as she answered, 'All liquors
Must be paid for ere leaving the room.'

== In other media ==
- In F. Scott Fitzgerald's debut novel This Side of Paradise, the protagonist Amory Blaine recites "Ulalume" while wandering through the countryside. Another character, Eleanor Savage, calls Blaine "the auburn-haired boy who likes 'Ulalume.'" When the two are caught in a thunderstorm, Savage volunteers to play the role of Psyche while Blaine recites the poem.
- In H. P. Lovecraft's novella At the Mountains of Madness, a character refers to the poem. While looking at Mount Erebus, a character suggests "this mountain, discovered in 1840, had undoubtedly been the source of Poe's image when he wrote seven years later", followed by a few lines of "Ulalume". Lovecraft's famous early poem "Nemesis" (1917) was also influenced by a combination of "Ulalume" and Algernon Swinburne's "Hertha".
- Roger Zelazny's 1993 novel, A Night in the Lonesome October and Richard Laymon's 2001 novel Night in the Lonesome October, each take their titles from this poem, though neither book seems to draw much else from Poe.
- In the Tennessee Williams play A Streetcar Named Desire the character Blanche DuBois likens the residence of her sister Stella to the "ghoul-haunted woodland of Weir", a reference to "Ulalume".
- In Stanley Kubrick's Lolita (1962), Humbert Humbert (James Mason) reads a fragment of the poem to Lolita (Sue Lyon).
- In his history of the Union Army, This Hallowed Ground, Pulitzer Prize-winning author, Bruce Catton places the American Civil War Battle of Chickamauga as occurring in a dark and frightening place evocative of Poe's "ghoul-haunted woodland of Weir".
- The singer Jeff Buckley recorded a reading of this poem.
- In Lynn Cullen's historical fiction novel Mrs. Poe (2014), the narrator and protagonist, Frances Sargent Osgood, uses the false name of Mrs. "Ulalume" when she and Edgar Allan Poe sneak off together to Boston. Later in the book, Cullen suggests that the "Psyche" referred to in the poem is actually Osgood, Poe's lover in the book, and that "Ulalume" refers to a daughter born to them, who died in October 1847.
- Joseph Holbrooke's Symphonic Poem Ulalume, Op. 35 is based on the poem.
- All three titles of TJ Klune's post-apocalyptic duology Immemorial Year, consisting of the novels Withered + Sere and Crisped + Sere, can be found in the first stanza of the poem. The main character, grieving his dead wife and son, is given a copy of the poem, and it is quoted from throughout the novels.
- In Cuac FM community radio from Galicia, Spain, one of the pioneer literary programs for 5 seasons was named "Ulalume", conducted by Estíbaliz Espinosa Río and Beatriz González de Canales.
