= A Place Where the Sun Is Silent =

Studio album by Alesana
- Released: October 18, 2011
- Genre: Post-hardcore; symphonic rock; emo; screamo
- Length: 62:02
- Label: Epitaph
- Producer: Kris Crummett

Alesana chronology
The Emptiness (2010)	A Place Where the Sun Is Silent (2011)	Confessions (2015)

Singles from A Place Where the Sun Is Silent
- 1. "A Gilded Masquerade" Released: August 22, 2011; 2. "A Forbidden Dance" Released: September 2011; 3. "Circle VII: Sins of the Lion" Released: October 4, 2011

Professional ratings
Review scores
Source	Rating
Audiopinions	6/10 stars
LMP Magazine	8.5/10 stars
Metromix	3/5 stars
Media Essentials	4/5 stars
Rockfreaks	7/10 stars
Under The Gun Review	9.5/10

A Place Where the Sun Is Silent is the fourth studio album by Alesana. It was released through Epitaph Records on October 18, 2011. The album was produced by Kris Crummett, who also worked on The Emptiness. Being the second concept album released by Alesana, A Place Where the Sun Is Silent was inspired by the epic poem The Inferno by Dante Alighieri.

On August 24, 2011 Alternative Press premiered the first song off the album, "A Gilded Masquerade" and on September 21, 2011 the magazine premiered the second song off the album, "A Forbidden Dance" before later showcasing the entire album off the website. On October 4, 2011, the band released a music video for "Circle VII: Sins of The Lion", with live performance clips. On December 6, 2011 Alesana released the music video for "Lullaby of the Crucified".

The album is currently the longest release by the band, running at 1 hour and 2 minutes total (excluding the deluxe edition's bonus tracks). iTunes mistakenly labeled the titles some of the track (scores) in the deluxe version of the record.

The song "Circle VII: Sins of the Lion" was voted the best song of 2011 by readers of Revolver.

== Track listing ==
Act One: The Gate
No.	Title	Length
1.	"The Dark Wood of Error"	2:13
2.	"A Forbidden Dance"	3:53
3.	"Hand in Hand with the Damned"	4:36
4.	"Beyond the Sacred Glass"	6:03
5.	"The Temptress"	4:21
6.	"Circle VII: Sins of the Lion"	4:08
7.	"Vestige"	2:58
8.	"Lullaby of the Crucified"	4:48

Act Two: The Immortal Sill
No.	Title	Length
9.	"Before Him All Shall Scatter"	0:54
10.	"Labyrinth"	4:04
11.	"The Fiend"	3:57
12.	"Welcome to the Vanity Faire"	4:37
13.	"The Wanderer"	1:37
14.	"A Gilded Masquerade"	4:35
15.	"The Best Laid Plans of Mice and Marionettes"	5:35
16.	"And Now for the Final Illusion"	3:43
Total length:		62:02

iTunes Deluxe Edition bonus tracks
No.	Title	Length
17.	"The Dark Wood of Error (Score)"	2:16
18.	"Vestige (Score)"	4:09
19.	"Lullaby of the Crucified (Score)"	2:59
20.	"Before Him All Shall Scatter (Score)"	4:47
21.	"The Wanderer (Score)"	1:37
22.	"A Gilded Masquerade (Score)"	5:20
23.	"The Best Laid Plans of Mice and Marionettes (Score)"	4:49
24.	"And Now for the Final Illusion (Score)"	3:35
Total length:		91:26

iTunes labeled the tracks 18, 19 & 20 incorrectly. Track 18 (Vestige) is supposed to be Circle VII: Sins Of The Lion; Track 19 (Lullaby of the Crucified) should be Vestige; and Track 20 is supposed to be Lullaby of the Crucified instead of Before Him All Shall Scatter.

== Personnel ==
Alesana

- Dennis Lee – unclean vocals
- Shawn Milke – lead vocals, piano, rhythm guitar
- Patrick Thompson – lead guitar, backing vocals
- Alex Torres – rhythm guitar, backing vocals, lead guitar
- Shane Crump – bass, backing vocals
- Jeremy Bryan – drums

Guest musicians

- Melissa Milke – female vocals
- Adam Fisher – spoken word vocals

Production

- Kris Crummett – producer

== Chart performance ==
Chart (2011)	Peak position
US Billboard 200	55
US Billboard Independent Albums	13
US Billboard Rock Albums	16
