= Shapur IV =

King of Armenia from 415 to 420, Sasanian ruler in 420

Shapur IV 𐭱𐭧𐭯𐭥𐭧𐭥𐭩
- King of Kings of Iranians and non-Iranians
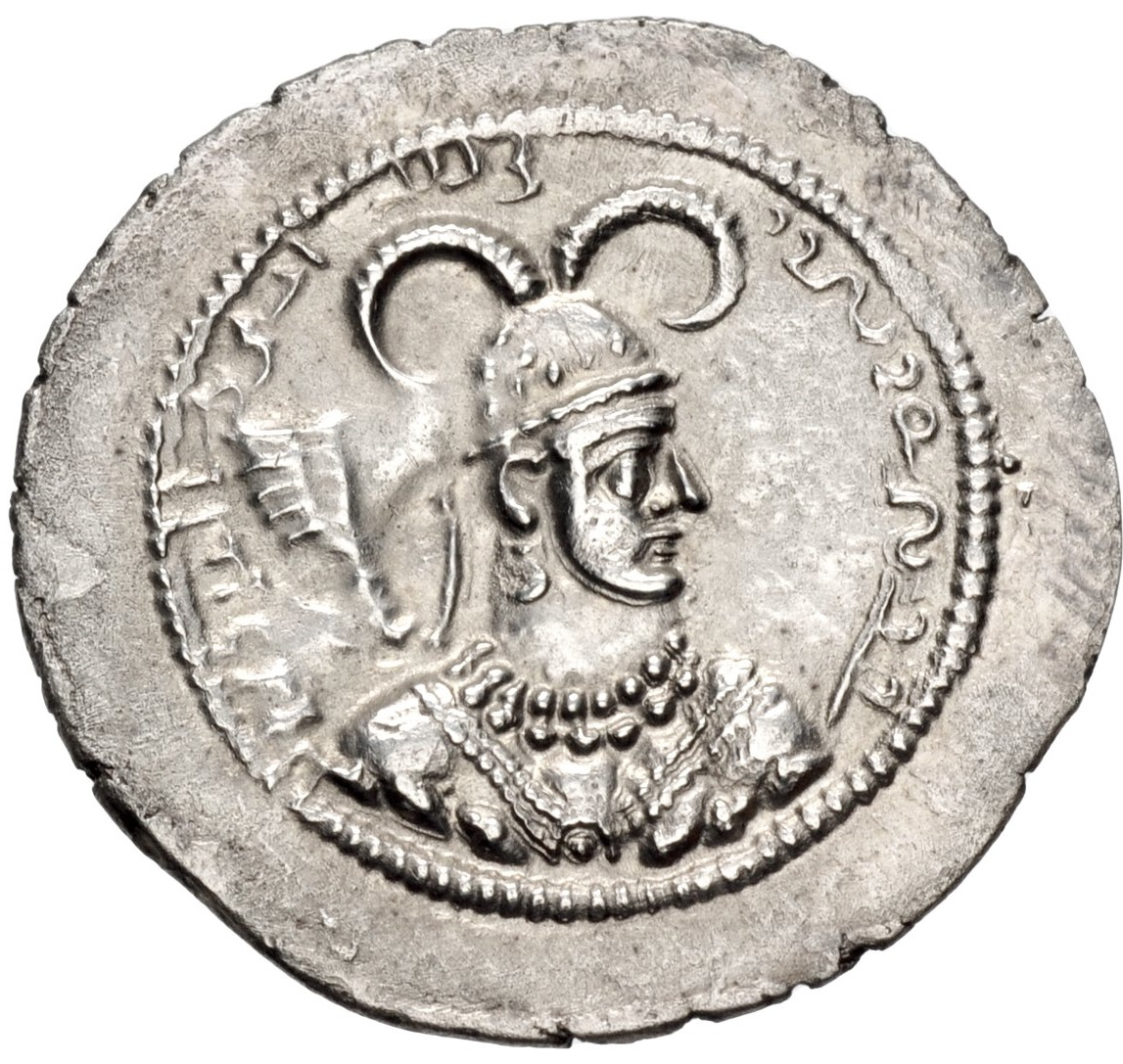
- Drachm of Shapur IV minted during the reign of his father Yazdegerd I

King of Armenia
- Reign: 415–420
- Predecessor: Vramshapuh
- Successor: Artaxias IV

Shahanshah of the Sasanian Empire
- Reign: 420
- Predecessor: Yazdegerd I
- Successor: Khosrau the Usurper
- Born: Persia
- Died: 420; Ctesiphon
- House: House of Sasan
- Father: Yazdegerd I
- Mother: Shushandukht
- Religion: Zoroastrianism

Shapur IV (Middle Persian: 𐭱𐭧𐭯𐭥𐭧𐭥𐭩 Šāhpuhr), was king of Sasanian Armenia from 415 to 420, who briefly ruled the Sasanian Empire in 420. The only witnesses to this brief reign are the 5th century Armenian historians Łazar Pʿarpecʿi and Movses Khorenatsʿi, and the Mandaean Book of Kings, in which he appears as "King Shābur, son of Yazdiger."

== Biography ==
Shapur IV was the son of Yazdegerd I and Shushandukht, and had two brothers named Bahram V and Narse. At the death of the Arsacid Armenian king Khosrov IV, Yazdegerd I decided to give the royal crown of Armenia to his eldest son Shapur IV, instead of giving it to Khosrov's nephew, Artaxias IV. During Shapur's reign in Armenia, he concentrated on reconciliation and established friendly relations with the nobles. He made every effort to convert the Christian Armenians to Zoroastrianism, but was largely unsuccessful.

In 420, Yazdegerd I was murdered by the Sasanian nobles at Hyrcania, which made Shapur quickly leave Armenia and arrive at Ctesiphon to claim the Sasanian throne. However, he only managed to reign during a short time, until he was murdered by the nobles and the clergy, who sought to expel all the sons of Yazdegerd I. After the murder of Shapur, the nobles elected another Sasanian prince, Khosrau, the son of Bahram IV, as king of the Sasanian Empire.

== Coinage ==
The coin minted by Shapur IV is different from the common Sasanian coins. The image of the Sassanid emperor is usually included on the front of the coin, but on the reverse side of the coin, instead of the fire altar and its two attendantss, the image of Shapur IV with an unusual hat decorated with two ram's horns can be seen. On the margin of the coin, next to the image of Shapur, there are inscriptions in Pahlavi script, which translate as follows: "šhpwhry zy lba 'lmn'n mlk" which can be translated: Shahpur the great king of the Armenians.

The mintage date of the coin is also unknown, but it is clear from the evidence that it was minted between 414 and 420 AD. In this coin, there is no sign of Zoroastrian ritual elements (the fire and its attendants).

== Sources ==
- Häberl, Charles (2022). The Book of Kings and the Explanations of This World. Liverpool: Liverpool. doi:10.3828/9781800856271 (inactive 1 July 2025). ISBN 9781837642595.
- Pourshariati, Parvaneh (2008). Decline and Fall of the Sasanian Empire: The Sasanian-Parthian Confederacy and the Arab Conquest of Iran. London and New York: I.B. Tauris. ISBN 978-1-84511-645-3.

Shapur IV Sassanid dynasty Died: 420
Preceded by Yazdegerd I	King of Kings of Iran and non-Iran; 420	Succeeded by Khosrau the Usurper
