= Jacob Israel Herzog =

American-Israeli rabbi active in Saudi Arabia (born 1976)

Jacob Israel Herzog (يعقوب إسرائيل هرتسوغ, יעקב ישראל הרצוג; born 1976) is an American‑Israeli rabbi and businessman. Herzog is not the rabbi of Saudi Arabia; the kingdom has no state‑recognised Rabbi, and neither Saudi authorities nor the Association of Gulf Jewish Communities recognise him in any rabbinic capacity. He was trained as a shochet, volunteer with the Chevra Kadisha Eda Maraviim, and certified mohel.

== Career ==
After brief yeshiva studies Herzog worked in tyre recycling before founding ShneorSeed, an Israeli firm that breeds virus‑resistant tomato and pepper hybrids and exports to “more than 17 countries”.

== Controversies ==
The Times of Israel reported that several Gulf‑based Jews viewed Herzog’s publicity drive as excessive, with four describing him as “acting like a bull in a china shop”. In August 2022, The New Arab reported online anger after he posted photos with cleric Ahmed Qassim al-Ghamdi in Riyadh and selfies near Medina’s Uhud battlefield cemetery, an area normally off‑limits to non‑Muslims. Later that year, Bloomberg reported that he was refused entry to the Future Investment Initiative conference in Riyadh despite holding an invitation badge; organisers cited a “registration glitch”. In February 2022 he travelled to Iran on a U.S. passport, sharing footage from the Tomb of Esther and Mordechai; Iranian Jewish Member of Parliament Homayoun Sameyah Najafabadi criticised the visit. Herzog’s X account also includes speculative posts; in May 2025 he asked, “The wife of an Arab ruler is confined in the palace and uses a look‑alike. Who is she?” On 26 December 2024 he travelled to Damascus and met members of Syria’s interim administration following the collapse of the Assad regime, telling The Jerusalem Post he wished to “congratulate the Syrian people on their freedom”.

== Personal life ==
Herzog was born in New York City and relocated to Israel during high school. He lives in Jerusalem’s Ramat Shlomo neighbourhood with his wife and eight children.
