= Vramshapuh =

King of Arsacid Armenia from 389 to 414

Vramshapuh Վռամշապուհ
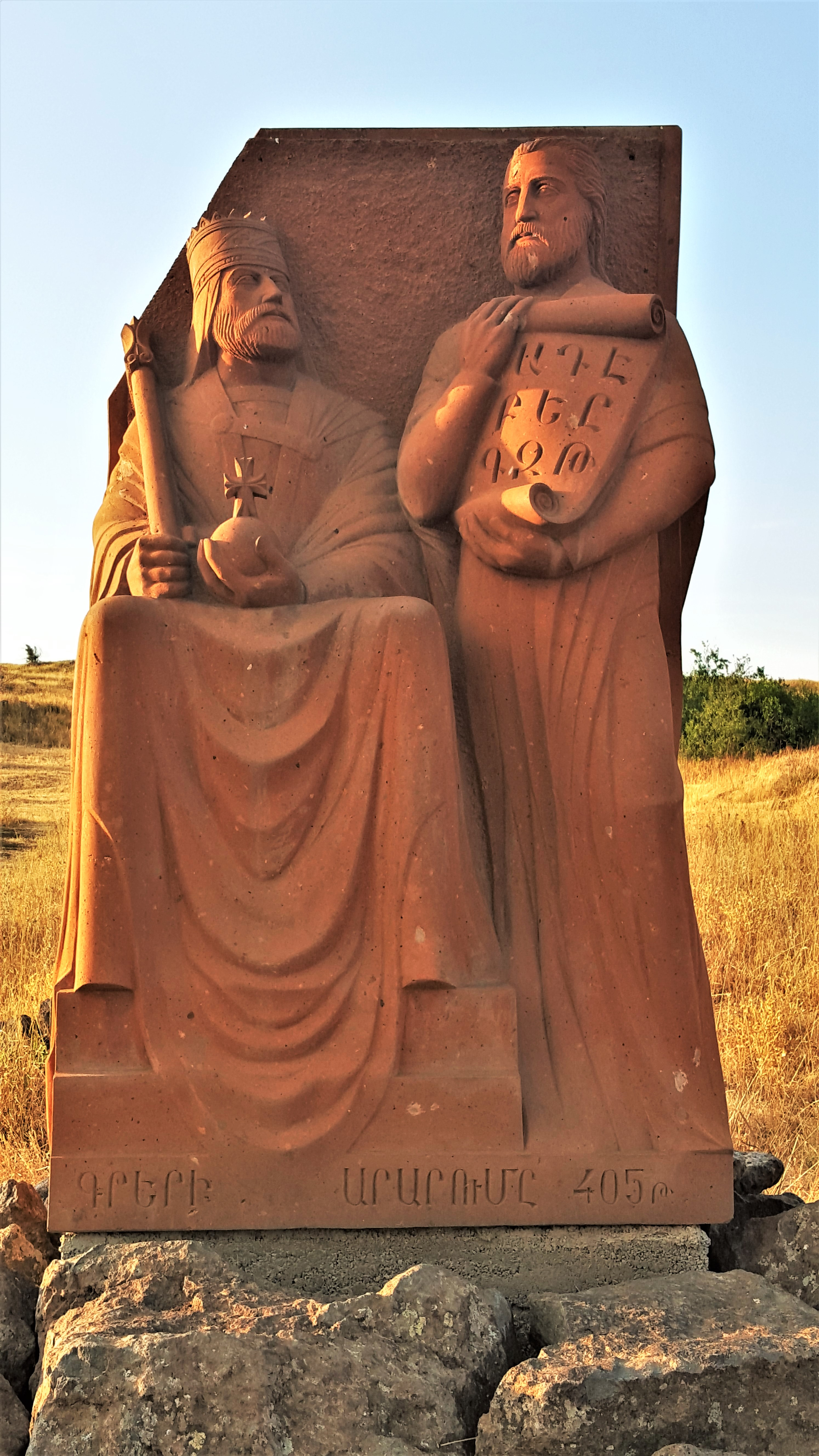
- Modern statue of Vramshapuh and Mesrop Mashtots

King of Armenia
- Reign: 389–414
- Predecessor: Khosrov IV
- Successor: Shapur IV
- Born: 340–343
- Died: 414
- Issue: Artaxias IV (Artashir IV)
- House: Arsacid
- Father: Varasdates (Varazdat)

Vramshapuh (Note: Also spelled Vramshapouh, Vramšapuh, Vrhamshapuh, Vram-Shapouh, and Bahram Shapur. and Bahram-Shahpur) (Armenian: Վռամշապուհ, romanized: Vramsapuh) was a noble of the Arsacid dynasty who served as the Sasanian client king of Armenia from 389 until his death in 414. He is mainly remembered for presiding over the creation of the Armenian alphabet by Mesrop Mashtots.

== Name ==
The name that Vramshapuh had prior to his kingship is unknown as he is only known by his ruling name. The name Vramshapuh is the Armenian translation of the Persian names Bahram and Shapur put together. When Vramshapuh succeeded his brother Khosrov IV in 389 as Sasanian client king of Arsacid Armenia, Vramshapuh assumed this name in compliment to the Sasanian shah Bahram IV. The names Bahram and Shapur were dynastic names of the ruling Sasanian dynasty and demonstrate the cultural influence that the Sasanians had on the remaining Arsacid Armenian monarchs living in Persia.

== Family background ==
The exact origins of Vramshapuh are unknown. The Armenian historian Ghazar Parpetsi, who lived between the 5th and 6th centuries, presents Vramshapuh as a prince from the Arsacid dynasty, without mentioning his parentage in his History of Armenia. Ghazar Parpetsi names him as the brother of his predecessor Khosrov IV and the father of Artaxias (Artashir) IV. According to modern genealogies, Vramshapuh was one of the sons of Varasdates (Varazdat). Vramshapuh was born and raised in Armenia and little is known of his life prior to his kingship.

== Rise to the throne ==
Sometime in 389, Bahram IV dethroned Khosrov IV and placed him in confinement in Ctesiphon. The Armenian nobility requested that the Sasanian shah appoint a king of Armenia from the Arsacid dynasty. Bahram IV, agreeing to their request, enthroned Vramshapuh as the new Sasanian Client King of Arsacid Armenia.

After his brother, Vramshapuh served as the second Sasanian client King of Arsacid Armenia. Not much is known of his relationship with Khosrov IV. As Vramshapuh ruled over Eastern Armenia, he was a Christian client monarch governing under suzerainty of a pagan Sasanian Empire whose official religion was Zoroastrianism.

== Rule over Eastern Armenia ==
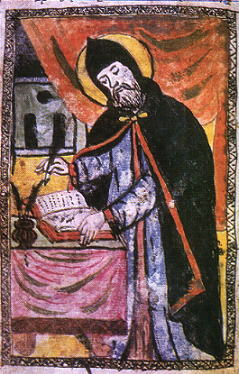
Illustration of Mesrop Mashtots from a 1776 manuscript.

Vramshapuh managed through his rule to unite the two parts of Greater Armenia. Saint Mesrop Mashtots continued his role as being the royal scribe and imperial secretary from the reign of Khosrov IV to his brother Vramshapuh.

Sahak the son of Nerses who was the last Gregorian Patriarch served as the Armenian Catholicos (Patriarch) during Vramshapuh's reign. Sahak and Vramshapuh were distantly related as Sahak's late paternal grandmother was the Arsacid Princess Bambish. Bambish was a sister to king Tigranes VII (Tiran) and a daughter of king Khosrov III.

Vramshapuh maintained peaceful relations between the Byzantine Empire and the Sasanian Empire. He is also known for his successful peace mission to Mesopotamia to mediate between Persia and Byzantium. Vramshapuh succeeded in winning the confidence of the Sasanian shah as well as the Armenians who were pro-Roman. Through maintaining good relations and restoring peace to both empires, Vramshapuh was able to establish a long peace which contributed to the internal improvement of the region into which Christianity was able to penetrate, which kept the spread of pagan faiths to a minimum.

The Sasanian shah Yazdegerd I, ratified Sahak as the Armenian Catholicos in which Vramshapuh promoted Sahak's son-in-law, Hamazasp Mamikonean, to the high office of general. This title, which was generally hereditary to the Mamikonean family, had been withheld from him for a long time. Vramshapuh appointed his prerogatives as were those of the Mardpet, the guardian of his harem (who was also the administrator of the Royal domain) and the Apset who placed the crown on Vramshapuh's head at his coronation. In his kingship, Vramshapuh was wise, beneficent and his reign was illustrious.

The reign of Vramshapuh is most noted under his patronage for Mesrop and Sahak for presiding over the creation of the Armenian alphabet in 405 to 406. The creation of the Armenian alphabet brought a last moment of glory to the Arsacids and Vramshapuh sent Sahak to the Sasanian court in Persia to conciliate over the creation of the alphabet. Vramshapuh became interested in the project and he was materially and morally the literacy project's great patron.

Catholicos Sahak Partev, by Francesco Maggiotto

The Armenian alphabet was a tool to greater unify Armenians living in the Byzantine Empire and the Sasanian Empire, giving a Christian identity to the Armenian people. The alphabet was the key to the survival of the Armenian culture and identity, providing the cohesive forces in society with a standard around which to rally. In time the Armenian language would become the native language of the Armenians, used throughout the country and the language was invented from Greek, Syriac and Persian scripts. The important role of the Armenian language at that time was to propagate the Christian religion. At that time the church scriptures in Armenia were read in Greek and Syriac. The majority of the people couldn't understand the scriptures being read in these languages. The creation of the Armenian alphabet during Vramshapuh's reign marks a symbolic time in the country's history leading to prominent flowering of Armenian literature, later called the Golden Age of Armenian Literature.

After the creation of the Armenian alphabet, Vramshapuh providing counsel, funds and assistance to the project, supported Mesrop and Sahak in carrying out educational missions in teaching the Armenians the new language. This led Armenians to better understand Christianity and the reading of the scriptures, in particular the preaching of Christianity in pagan sections of the country.

After this moment, little is known about the remaining years of Vramshapuh's reign. He died in 417 leaving a son, Artaxias IV, with a mother whose name is unknown. At the time, Artaxias IV was too young to succeed his father. After the death of Vramshapuh, Sahak visited the court of the Sasanian shah Yazdegerd I in releasing Khosrov IV from political exile. Yazdegerd I consented with Sahak in releasing Khosrov IV from imprisonment.

When Khosrov IV was released from political exile, there is a possibility he may have served again as king of Armenia from 417 until about 418. The possible second reign of Khosrov IV, may have only lasted up to a year, as he died in 418. From 417 til 422 Armenia was under direct rule of the Nakharars and the Sasanian dynasty. In 422 Artaxias IV was appointed King of Armenia by the Sasanian dynasty.

== Commemorative coinage ==
2005 marked the 1600th anniversary of the invention of the Armenian alphabet. To celebrate the occasion the Central Bank of Armenia issued silver commemorative coins with the nominal value of Dram 100, dedicated to Vramshapuh.

== Sources ==
- Faustus of Byzantium, History of the Armenians, 5th century
- Ghazar Parpetsi, History of Armenia, 5th to 6th century
- Encyclopædia Britannica (1890-1907)
- Toumanoff, Cyril (1976). Manuel de Généalogie et de Chronologie pour l'Histoire de la Caucasie Chrétienne (Arménie-Géorgie-Albanie) (in French). Rome: Edizioni Aquila. OCLC 4780662.
- N. Ouzounian, The Heritage of Armenian Literature: From the Oral Tradition to the Golden Age, Wayne State University Press, 2000
- M. Chahin, The Kingdom of Armenia A history, Routledge, 2001
- R.G. Hovannisian, The Armenian People From Ancient to Modern Times, Volume I: The Dynastic Periods: From Antiquity to the Fourteenth Century, Palgrave Macmillan, 2004
- V.M. Kurkjian, A History of Armenia, Indo-European Publishing, 2008
- T. Daryaee, The Oxford Handbook of Iranian History, Oxford University Press, 2012
- Commemorative Coinage of Vramshapuh
- Western Diocese of the Armenian Church - The Faith of the Armenian Church - The Armenian Church: A Brief Introduction By Hratch Tchilingirian

== See also ==
- Armenian alphabet
