= Zaeske =

Zaeske is a surname. Notable people with the surname include:

- Paul Zaeske (1945–1992), American football player
- Susan Zaeske, American professor
