= Yazdegerd I =

Shahanshah of the Sasanian Empire from 399 to 420

Yazdegerd I 𐭩𐭦𐭣𐭪𐭥𐭲𐭩
- King of Kings of Iranians and non-Iranians
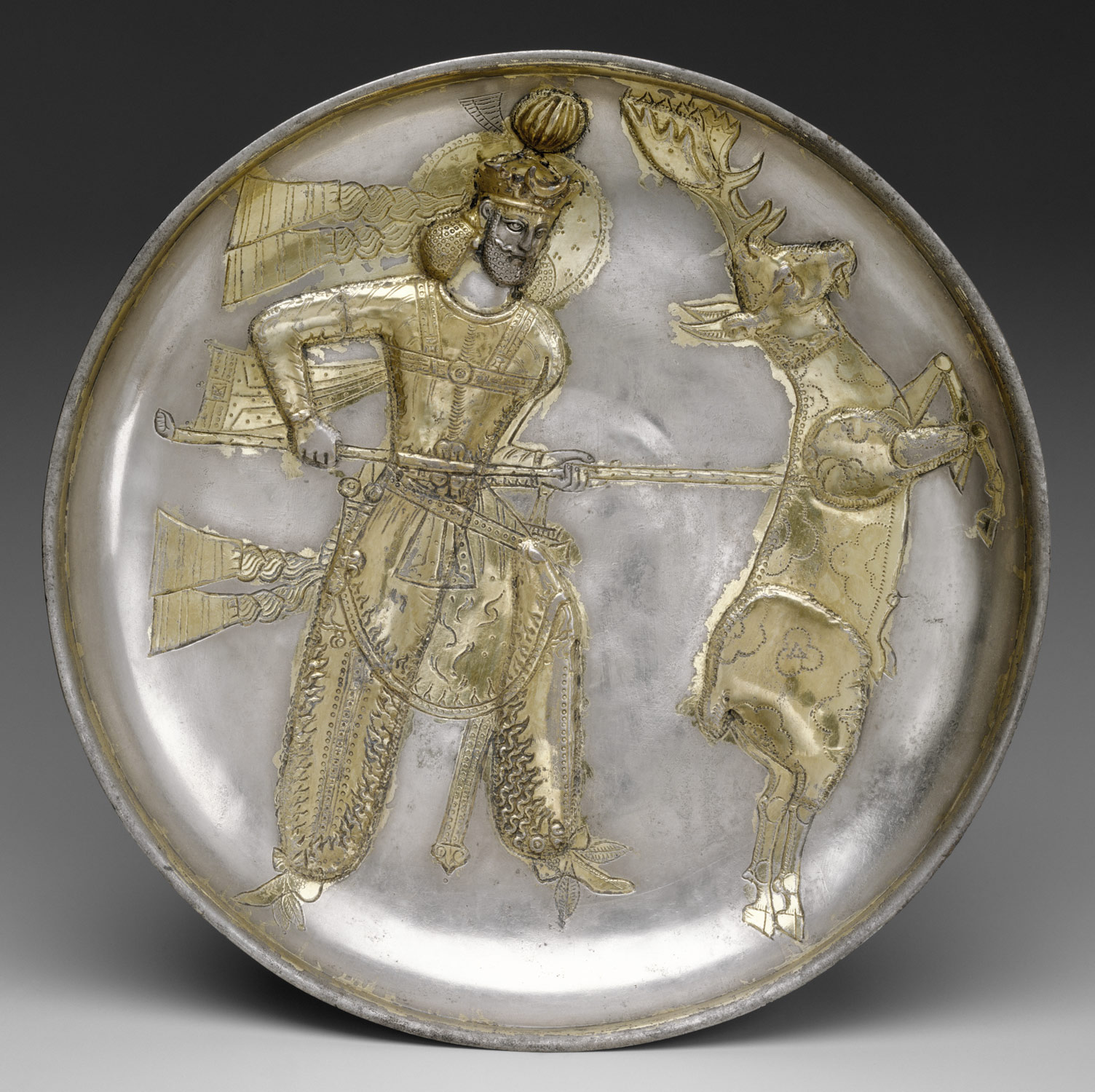
- 5th-century plate of Yazdegerd I slaying a stag.

Shahanshah of the Sasanian Empire
- Reign: 399–420
- Predecessor: Bahram IV
- Successor: Shapur IV
- Died: 420; Gurgan or Tus
- Spouse: Shushandukht
- Issue: Shapur IV; Bahram V; Narseh
- House: House of Sasan
- Father: Shapur III
- Religion: Zoroastrianism

Yazdegerd I (also spelled Yazdgerd and Yazdgird; Middle Persian: 𐭩𐭦𐭣𐭪𐭥𐭲𐭩) was the Sasanian King of Kings (shahanshah) of Iran from 399 to 420. A son of Shapur III (r. 383–388), he succeeded his brother Bahram IV (r. 388–399) after the latter's assassination.

The largely uneventful reign of Yazdegerd I is seen in Sasanian history as a period of renewal, although he was periodically known as "the Sinner" in native sources, Yazdegerd was more competent than his immediate predecessors. He enjoyed cordial relations with the Eastern Roman Empire and was entrusted by Arcadius with the guardianship of his son Theodosius. Yazdegerd I is known for his friendly relations with the Jews as well as the Christians of the Church of the East, which he acknowledged in 410. As a result, he was compared by the Jews and Christians to Cyrus the Great, the Achaemenid emperor who liberated the Jews from captivity in Babylon.

His religious policies were disliked by the nobility and the Zoroastrian clergy, whose power and influence he strove to curb. These efforts eventually backfired and Yazdegerd I met his end at the hands of the nobility in the remote northeast. The nobles then sought to prevent Yazdegerd's sons from ascending the throne; his eldest son, Shapur IV, was quickly killed after his accession and replaced with Khosrow. Another son, Bahram V, hurried to the Sasanian capital of Ctesiphon with an Arab army and pressured the nobility to acknowledge him as shah.

== Etymology ==
The name Yazdegerd is a combination of the Old Iranian yazata (divine being) and -kərta (made) – "God-made", comparable to the Iranian Bagkart and Greek Theoktistos. It is known in other languages as Yazdekert (Pahlavi); Yazd[e]gerd (New Persian); Yazdegerd, Izdegerd and Yazdeger (Syriac); Yazkert (Armenian); Izdeger and Azger (in the Talmud); Yazdeijerd (Arabic), and Isdigerdes (Greek).

== Background ==
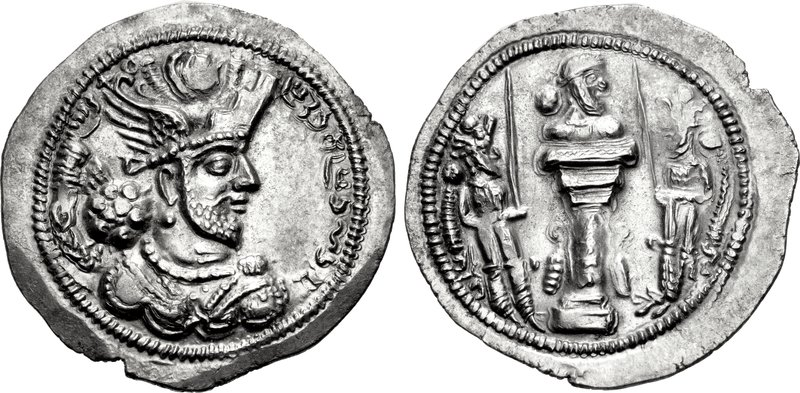
Drachma of Bahram IV (r. 388–399)

Yazdegerd I was the son of Shapur III (r. 383–388). When Yazdegerd I's brother Bahram IV (r. 388–399) was assassinated in 399, he succeeded him. Yazdegerd I inherited an empire which had been through tumultuous times; his three previous predecessors, Bahram IV, Shapur III and Ardashir II, had been murdered by the nobility. Most of the high nobility belonged to the powerful Parthian noble families (known as the wuzurgan) who were centered on the Iranian Plateau. The backbone of the Sasanian feudal army, they were largely autonomous.

The Sasanian shahs had little control of the wuzurgan, and attempts to restrict them were usually costly to the shah (as indicated by the fate of the three previous shahs). The Parthian nobility worked for the Sasanian shah for personal benefits, out of loyalty, and (possibly) an awareness of the Aryan, ie. Iranian, kinship they shared with their Persian overlords. Late in Yazdegerd's reign, the powerful Parthian House of Suren became powerful associates of the shah and played a key role in the affairs of the empire. The authority of the Suren family flourished until the end of the reign of Yazdegerd's grandson, Yazdegerd II (r. 438–457).

== Relations with the Eastern Roman Empire ==
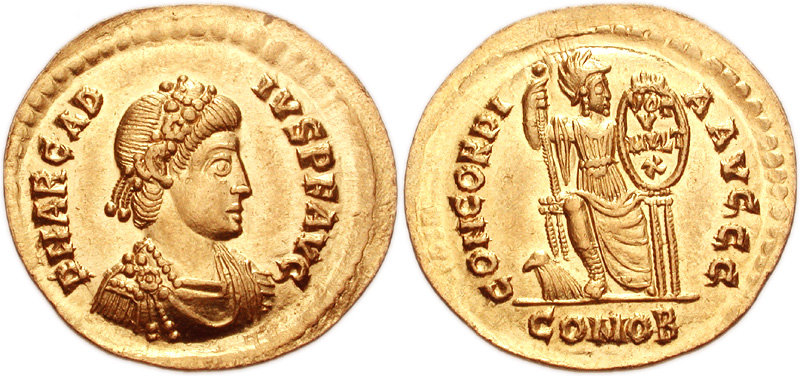
Solidus of Arcadius (r. 383–408)

During Yazdegerd I's rule, his western neighbours in the Eastern Roman Empire were in turmoil; while experiencing a civil war, their territory in the Balkans was attacked by the Ostrogoths, and rebellion was occurring amongst their Frankish subjects and the eastern provinces. Instead of exploiting the empire's weakened state, Yazdegerd I had Roman Christian prisoners who were saved after an Iranian victory over the Huns returned to Roman territory. The Roman emperor Arcadius (r. 383–408) asked Yazdegerd for aid to guarantee the succession of his young son, Theodosius, as a result of the shah's generosity.

This account is only mentioned by the 6th-century Roman historian Procopius and was questioned by his fellow Roman historian Agathias, who wrote that the report was "on the lips" of "Roman commoners and aristocrats alike" but was absent from contemporary sources. Yazdegerd I agreed to act as Theodosius' protector, however, and threatened to wage war against whoever sought to put him in danger. According to Procopius, "Loyally observing the behests of Arcadius, [Yazdegerd] adopted and continued without interruption a policy of profound peace with the Romans, and thus preserved the empire for Theodosius." The shah sent Antiochus, "a most remarkable and highly educated advisor and instructor", to educate Theodosius.

== Relations with the Christians ==
=== Background ===
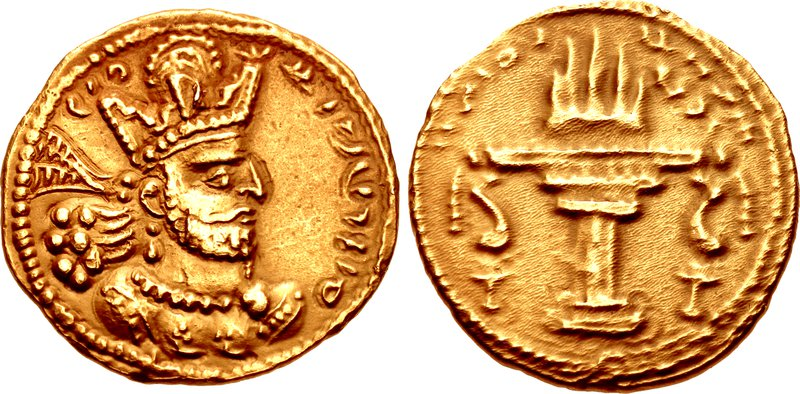
Gold dinar of Shapur II (r. 309–379)

Yazdegerd I, like all other Sasanian rulers, was an adherent of Zoroastrianism. One of his predecessors, the powerful Sasanian shah Shapur II (r. 309–379), was thought to have brutally persecuted the Christians of Iran from 340 to 379 in a "Great Persecution". Although later shahs – Yazdegerd I, Bahram V (r. 420–438), Yazdegerd II (r. 438–457), Peroz I (r. 459–484), Khosrow I (r. 531–579) and Khosrow II (r. 591–628) – were also said to have persecuted the Church of the East, the church quickly expanded. According to hagiographical sources, this was due to the "unwavering hostility of Zoroastrian religious authorities toward Christians."

Persecution of the Christians, however, was limited to their religious leaders who had failed to meet the commitment demanded of them by the court. Although Shapur II disciplined leading priestly leaders for insubordination, neither he nor his court persecuted the Christian population as a whole; the "Great Persecution" was fictional. According to the modern historian Eberhard Sauer, Sasanian shahs persecuted other religions only when it was in their urgent political interest to do so. Shapur II's killing of Christians was due to the priestly leaders' refusal to participate more fully in the management of the empire. This was finally achieved during Yazdegerd's reign, when the priestly leaders agreed to cooperate with the court.

=== Establishment of the Iranian church ===
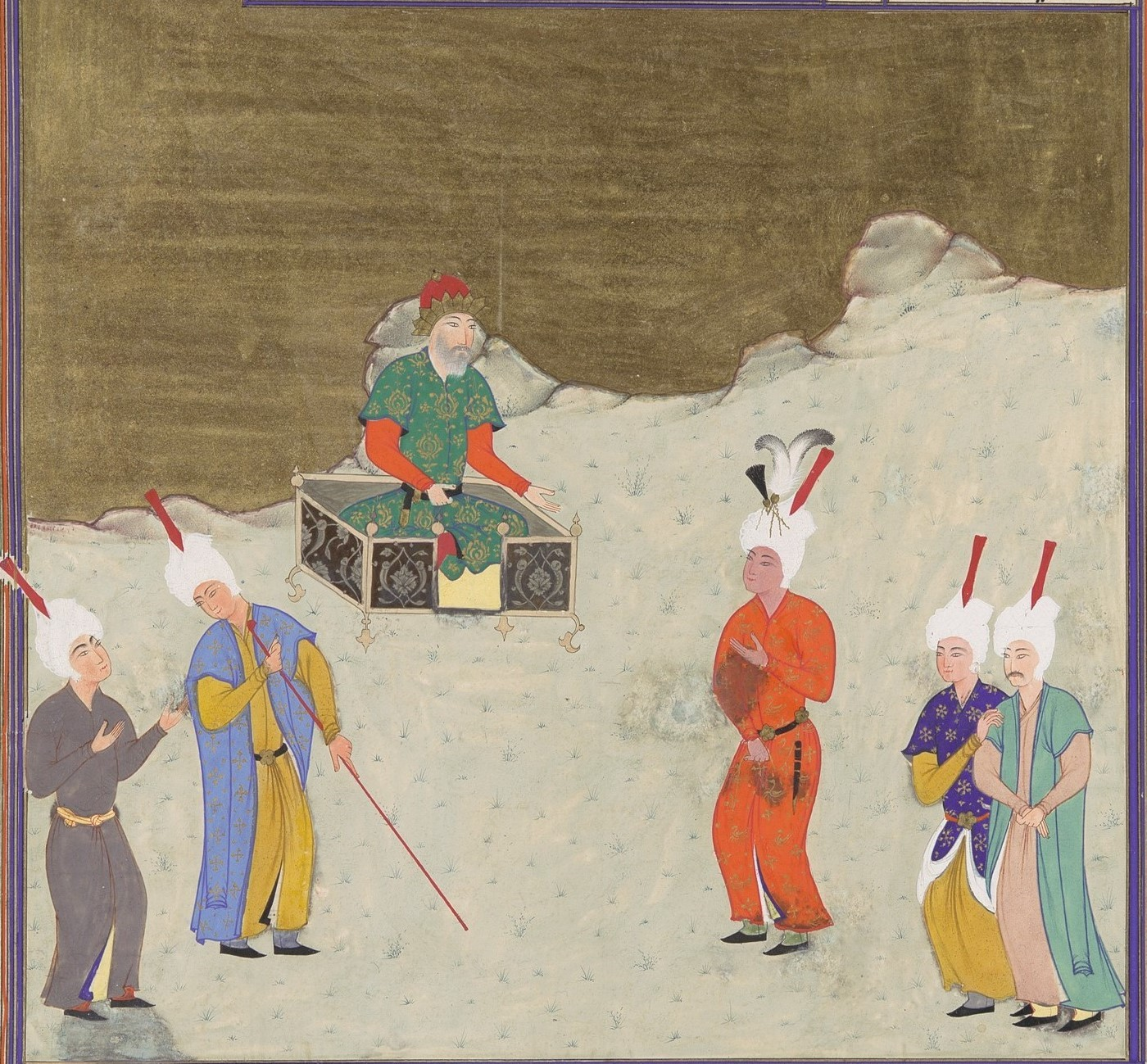
16th-century Shahnameh illustration of Yazdegerd I and his son, the future Bahram V

Yazdegerd I's reign was a landmark for the Christians in Iran. With the counsel of Roman bishop Marutha, he acknowledged the Church of the East in 410; this led to the establishment of the Iranian church, which would declare its independence from the Roman church in 424. Yazdegerd's decree has been called the Sasanian version of the 313 Edict of Milan by Roman emperor Constantine the Great (r. 306–337). Churches, shrines to martyrs, and monasteries were soon established under Iranian bureaucracy. They were near the court in the Sasanian capital of Ctesiphon, indicating the consent of Yazdegerd (who financed churches with East Syrian or Roman diplomats as their main patrons). One of his gestures of generosity was to permit Christians to bury their dead, which Zoroastrians believed tainted the land.

The number of Christian elites in the bureaucracy increased, a flow which continued until the fall of the empire in 651. Although priestly leaders such as Shemon Bar Sabbae and his colleagues had zealously opposed Shapur II's request to participate in the imperial bureaucracy, the bishops began operating as agents of Iran (dissociating themselves from Zoroastrianism) during the fifth century. Yazdegerd made use of the priestly leaders, sending the Patriarch of Ctesiphon to mediate between himself and his brother (the governor of Pars, in southern Iran). Another patriarch was Yazdegerd's ambassador to Theodosius. The shah does not seem to have had much knowledge of Christianity, and was (like Shapur II) more interested in improving his empire's political and economic capabilities. Owing to his tolerant treatment of the Christians, he is described in their chronicles as a "noble soul" and a second Cyrus the Great (r. 550 – 530 BC), the founder of the Iranian Achaemenid Empire.

=== Persecution ===
Reckless acts by the Christians tested Yazdegerd I's tolerance toward them at the end of his reign. Abda, the bishop of Ohrmazd-Ardashir in Khuzestan, and a band of Christian priests and laity levelled a Zoroastrian fire temple in c. 419–420; the court summoned them to answer for their actions. Yazdegerd was said to ask Abda, "Since you are the chief and leader of these men, why do you allow them to despise our kingdom, to transgress against our command, and to act in accordance with their own will? Do you demolish and destroy our houses of worship and the foundations of our fire temples, which we have received from the fathers of our fathers to honor?" Although Abda hesitated to answer, a priest in his entourage replied: "I demolished the foundation and extinguished the fire because it is not a house of God, nor is the fire the daughter of God." Demolishing a fire temple was reportedly a way of broadcasting the "victory of Christianity."

Abda refused to have the fire temple rebuilt, and he and his entourage were executed. At another location, a priest had a sacred fire put out and celebrated mass there. Yazdegerd I, forced to yield to pressure from the Zoroastrian priesthood, changed his policy towards the Christians and ordered them persecuted. Probably due to his change of policy, Yazdegerd appointed Mihr Narseh of the Suren family as his minister (wuzurg framadar). This brief persecution did not mar Yazdegerd I's representation in Christian sources, some of which justified his actions.

== Relations with the Jews ==
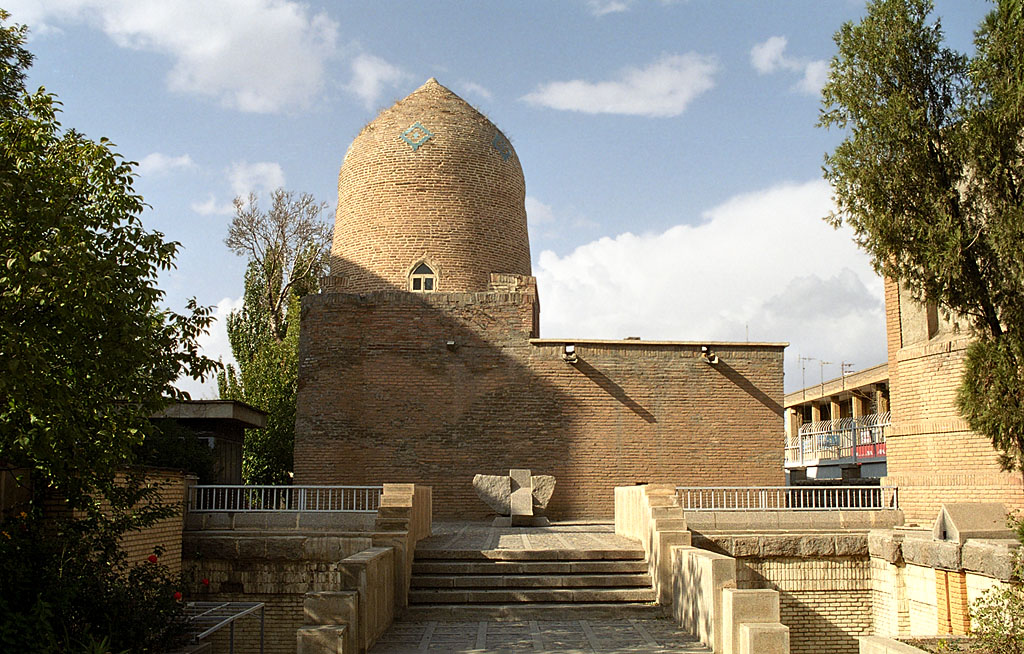
The Tomb of Esther and Mordechai, which may be the tomb of Shushandukht (Yazdegerd's Jewish wife)

The Jews of Iran were treated so generously and respectfully by Yazdegerd I that their exilarch called him the new Cyrus the Great, who liberated the Jews from captivity in Babylon. Although Yazdegerd was reportedly kind to the rabbis and quoted scriptures to them, this account may have been a fabrication of Jewish historiography. He had a Jewish wife, Shushandukht, the daughter of the exilarch. The identity of her father is obscure; he may have been Mar Kahana I, Mar Yemar, or Mar Zutra. The Middle Persian geography text Šahrestānīhā ī Ērānšahr (The Provincial Capitals of Iran) reports that Yazdegerd had Jews settled in Spahan at Shushandukht's request, and she was the mother of his son Bahram V. According to the Iranologist Ernst Herzfeld, the Tomb of Esther and Mordechai in Hamadan was not the burial site of Esther and Mordechai but that of Shushandukht.

== Personality and relations with nobility and clergy ==
Roman sources describe Yazdegerd I as an astute, benevolent and friendly ruler. Said to be well-read, "from the start" he was known for "nobility of character" and as a champion of "the poor and the wretched." Persian and Arabic sources, however, call him a "sinner" (bazehkar or bezehgar) and "outcast" (dabhr). (Note: From the Middle Persian word dīpahr (prison).) They describe him as a monarch who misused his authority by intimidating and suppressing the nobility and Zoroastrian clergy. This hostile view of Yazdegerd is due to his peaceful attitude towards the Romans and his religious tolerance of the country's non-Zoroastrians (the Christians and Jews).

The hostility of the priesthood towards Yazdegerd was due to his execution of several Zoroastrian priests who disapproved of his friendly management of the religious minorities. Well aware of the fate of his predecessor, Yazdegerd I could not put his trust in the nobility and prevented them from acquiring excessive influence at the expense of royal power; therefore, he was at odds with the nobility and clergy. Yazdegerd was more competent than his recent predecessors, however, and his reign is seen in Sasanian history as a period of renewal.

== Coins and imperial ideology ==
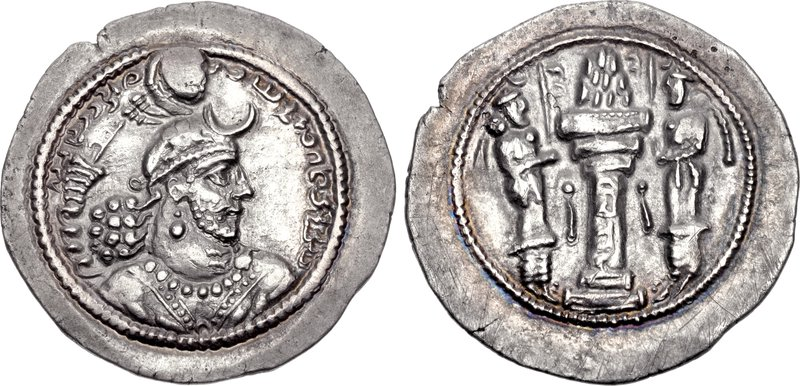
Drachma of Yazdegerd I

Yazdegerd I's coins portray him wearing a combination of the dome-shaped crown used by Ardashir II and two merlons and a crescent moon on the top. His reign marks a shift in the political perspective of the Sasanian Empire, which (originally disposed towards the West) moved to the East. The shift may have been triggered by hostile tribes in eastern Iran. The war with the Iranian Huns may have reawakened the mythical rivalry between the mythological Iranian Kayanian rulers and their Turanian enemies, which is illustrated by Younger Avestan texts. The title of Ramshahr (peacekeeper in [his] dominion) was added to the traditional "King of Kings of the Iranians and non-Iranians" on Yazdegerd's coins. (Note: The word ram may be translated as "peace", "ease", "pleasure", "joy" or "satisfaction"; it is most likely "peace" in Yazdegerd I's case.) In the Middle Persian heroic poem Ayadgar-i Zariran (The Testament of Zarer), the title was used by the last Kayanian monarch (Vishtaspa) and occurs in the 10th-century Zoroastrian Denkard. Sasanian interest in Kayanian ideology and history continued until the end of the empire.

Under Yazdegerd I, a mint was established in the city of Yazd (under the mint abbreviation of "YZ"), which demonstrates its increasing importance. A mint was also established in Gurrah, and possibly Gahrum.

== Building activities ==
Yazdegerd I is notable for having ordered the renewal of a number cities, which include Qumis, Hamadan, Susa, Shushtar, and Spahan. His military commanders are said to have founded the cities of Aqda and Maybud.

== Death and succession ==
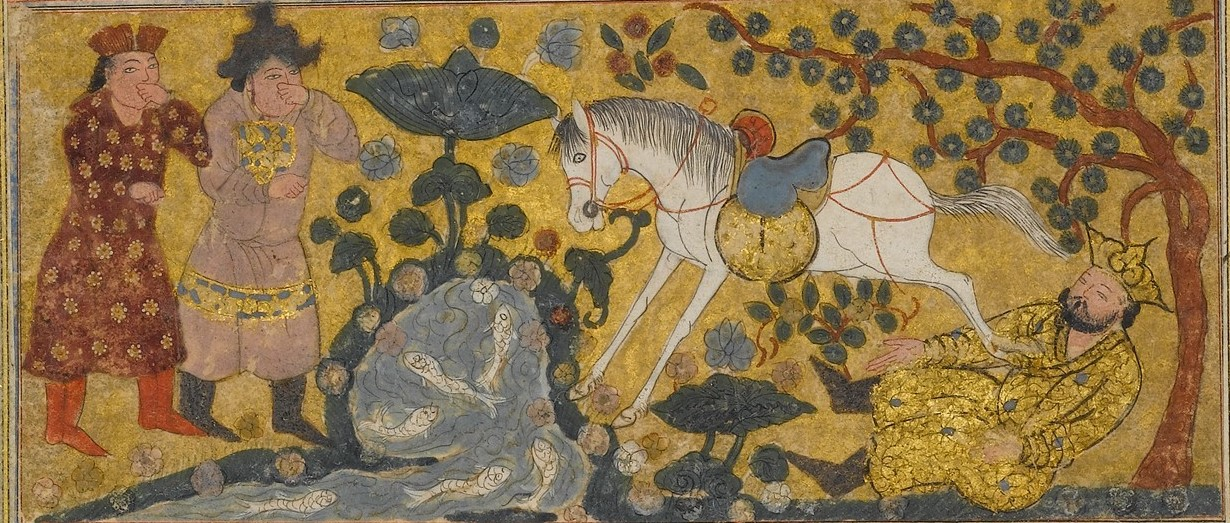
14th-century Shahnameh illustration of Yazdegerd I, kicked to death by a white horse

Yazdegerd I died in 420. According to 5th-century Armenian historian Movses Khorenatsi, his cause of death was disease. According to an old, popular legend mentioned by Ferdowsi in the Shahnameh, however, he was kicked to death by a white horse which suddenly arose from the Chishmih-i Su or Chishmih-i Sabz (the green spring) adjacent to the city of Tus in the eastern province of Abarshahr. The horse was said to suddenly disappear afterwards. German orientalist Theodor Nöldeke surmised that "Ferdowsi had fecklessly grafted this tradition onto traditions of his hometown, Tus", and the murder may have taken place in Gurgan; the legend predated Ferdowsi's work. Whether Yazdegerd's death was in Tus or Gurgan, the legend was probably fabricated by the Parthian nobility who had Yazdegerd I killed in the distant northeast (the traditional homeland of the Parthians and part of the fiefdom of three strong Parthian families, including the Kanarangiyan, who were based in the Tus region).

The nobility and clergy, who despised Yazdegerd I, now strove to strip his sons of kingship. Three are known: Shapur, Bahram and Narseh. Shapur (the governor-king of Armenia) rushed to Ctesiphon and assumed the crown as Shapur IV, but was betrayed by his courtiers and killed. The nobility then placed Bahram IV's son, Khosrow, on the throne. Bahram, who had grown up in the Lakhmid court of al-Hira, arrived in Ctesiphon with an Arab army and pressured the nobility to acknowledge him as Shah Bahram V. His brother, Narseh, was appointed governor of Abarshahr.

== Sources ==
- Boyce, Mary (1984). Zoroastrians: Their Religious Beliefs and Practices. Psychology Press. pp. 1–252. ISBN 9780415239028.
- Choksy, Jamsheed K. (2020). "Yazd: a "Good and Noble City" and an "Abode of Worship"". In Durand-Guédy, David; Mottahedeh, Roy; Paul, Jürgen (eds.). Cities of Medieval Iran. Brill. pp. 217–252. ISBN 978-90-04-43433-2.
- Daryaee, Touraj (2014). Sasanian Persia: The Rise and Fall of an Empire. I.B.Tauris. pp. 1–240. ISBN 978-0857716668.
- Daryaee, Touraj (2000). "Yazdegerd II". In Yarshater, Ehsan (ed.). Encyclopædia Iranica (Online ed.). Encyclopædia Iranica Foundation.
- Daryaee, Touraj; Rezakhani, Khodadad (2017). "The Sasanian Empire". In Daryaee, Touraj (ed.). King of the Seven Climes: A History of the Ancient Iranian World (3000 BCE - 651 CE). UCI Jordan Center for Persian Studies. pp. 1–236. ISBN 9780692864401.
- Daryaee, Touraj (2002). "History, Epic, and Numistamatics: On the title of Yazdegerd I (Ramshahr)". American Journal of Numismatics. 14: 89–95. JSTOR 43580250. (registration required)
- Daryaee, Touraj (2019). "The Sasanian Empire". The Syriac World: 33–43.
- Edwell, Peter (2013). "Sasanian Interactions with Rome and Byzantium". In Potts, Daniel T. (ed.). The Oxford Handbook of Ancient Iran. Oxford University Press. pp. 1–1021. ISBN 9780190668662.
- Kia, Mehrdad (2016). The Persian Empire: A Historical Encyclopedia [2 volumes]: A Historical Encyclopedia. ABC-CLIO. ISBN 978-1610693912.
- McDonough, Scott (2008). "A Second Constantine?: The Sasanian King Yazdgard in Christian History and Historiography". Journal of Late Antiquity. 1. Johns Hopkins University Press: 127–140. doi:10.1353/jla.0.0000. S2CID 162392426.
- McDonough, Scott (2013). "Military and Society in Sasanian Iran". In Campbell, Brian; Tritle, Lawrence A. (eds.). The Oxford Handbook of Warfare in the Classical World. Oxford University Press. pp. 1–783. ISBN 9780195304657.
- Miri, Negin (2012). "Sasanian Pars: Historical Geography and Administrative Organization". Sasanika: 1–183.
- Netzer, Amnon (2007). "Isfahan xviii. Jewish Community". In Yarshater, Ehsan (ed.). Encyclopædia Iranica. Vol. XIV/1: Isfahan IX. Pahlavi period–Isfahan XXII. Gazi dialect. London and New York: Routledge & Kegan Paul. pp. 74–77. ISBN 978-0-933273-99-3.
- Netzer, Amnon (1998). "Esther and Mordechai". In Yarshater, Ehsan (ed.). Encyclopædia Iranica. Vol. VIII/6: Eršād al-zerāʿa–Eʿteżād-al-Salṭana. London and New York: Routledge & Kegan Paul. pp. 657–658. ISBN 978-1-56859-055-4.
- Payne, Richard E. (2015). A State of Mixture: Christians, Zoroastrians, and Iranian Political Culture in Late Antiquity. Univ of California Press. pp. 1–320. ISBN 9780520961531.
- Pourshariati, Parvaneh (2008). Decline and Fall of the Sasanian Empire: The Sasanian-Parthian Confederacy and the Arab Conquest of Iran. London and New York: I.B. Tauris. ISBN 978-1-84511-645-3.
- Sauer, Eberhard (2017). Sasanian Persia: Between Rome and the Steppes of Eurasia. London and New York: Edinburgh University Press. pp. 1–336. ISBN 9781474401029.
- Schindel, Nikolaus (2013). "Sasanian Coinage". In Potts, Daniel T. (ed.). The Oxford Handbook of Ancient Iran. Oxford University Press. pp. 1–1021. ISBN 9780190668662.
- Shahbazi, A. Shapur (2003). "Yazdegerd I". In Yarshater, Ehsan (ed.). Encyclopædia Iranica (Online ed.). Encyclopædia Iranica Foundation.
- Shahbazi, A. Shapur (2005). "Sasanian dynasty". In Yarshater, Ehsan (ed.). Encyclopædia Iranica (Online ed.). Encyclopædia Iranica Foundation.
- Shayegan, M. Rahim (2013). "Sasanian political ideology". In Potts, Daniel T. (ed.). The Oxford Handbook of Ancient Iran. Oxford University Press. pp. 1–1021. ISBN 9780190668662.
- Wiesehöfer, Josef (2018). "Yazdegerd I (MP Yazdgird)". In Nicholson, Oliver (ed.). The Oxford Dictionary of Late Antiquity. Oxford: Oxford University Press. ISBN 978-0-19-866277-8.

Yazdegerd I Sasanian dynasty Died: 420
Preceded by Bahram IV	King of Kings of Iran and non-Iran; 399–420	Succeeded by Shapur IV
