= Shushandukht =

Wife of Yazdegerd I

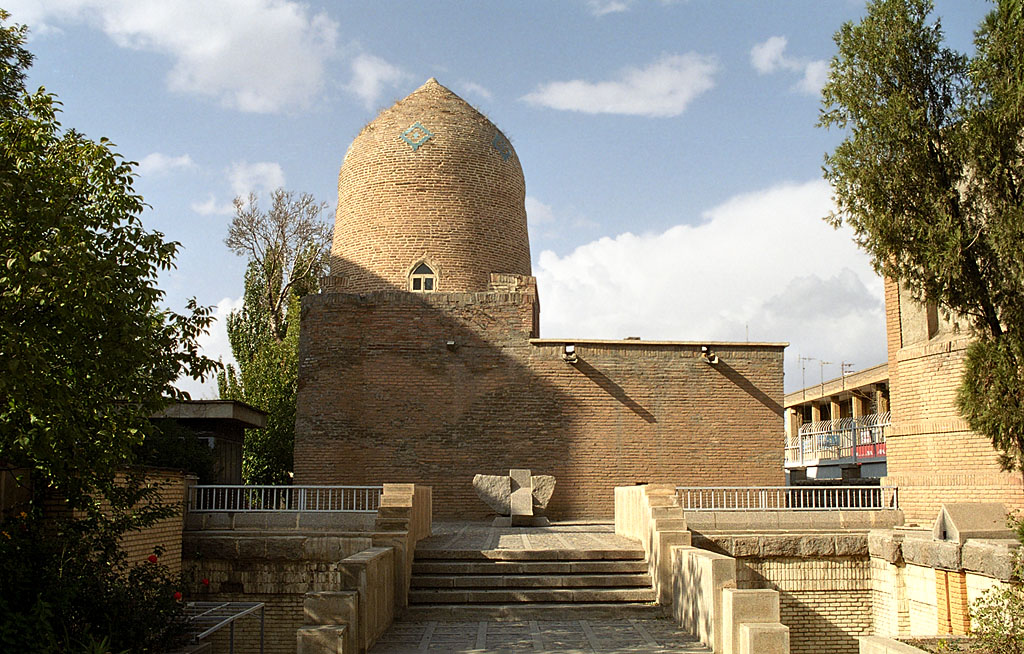
The mausoleum of Esther and Mordechai, also attributed to Shushandukht

Shushandukht (Middle Persian: 𐭱𐭩𐭱𐭩𐭭𐭲𐭥𐭤𐭲, romanized: Šīšīntūḥt, lit. 'Daughter of Susa'; Persian: شوشان‌دخت, romanized: Šušân-doxt) was the Jewish wife of the Sasanian emperor Yazdegerd I (r. 399—420), and mother of Bahram V, his successor, the 15th king of the Sasanian Empire.

Her other two sons were Shapur IV and Narseh--who founded the city of Khwarzem, which was later affiliated with the Kuzarim who converted to Judaism. She was also said to be the daughter of the Exilarch (Middle Persian rēš-galūdag) and rabbi Huna bar Nathan.

Shushandukht reputedly created the Jewish neighborhood of Jouybareh in Isfahan and also established Jewish colonies in the cities of Susa and Shushtar in what is now Khuzestan province, Iran, at the north of the Persian Gulf. The German Iranologist Ernst Herzfeld (1879–1948) speculated that the Tomb of Esther and Mordechai in the city of Hamadan might be the tomb of Shushandukht.

The narrative of a Jewish queen enhanced the life of Persian Jews even if Jewish communities existed in Isfahan long before this date, according to earlier authors. Researcher Aptin Khanbaghi notes that the Babylonian Talmud recounts that the Exilarch Huna bar Nathan interacted with Yazdegerd. No daughter or Jewish empress is mentioned.

Professor Simcha Gross writes that Shushandukht is mentioned in only one text, The Provincial Capitals of Ērānšahr (Middle Persian Šahrestānīhā ī Ērānšahr). It is also the only Middle Persian text to "expressly acknowledge the institution of the exilarchate", and Gross argues she may be fictional, perhaps based on the figure of Esther. Gross says her story may date to the tenth or eleventh century, the "Iranian intermezzo", as a way to bolster the royal claims of local rulers.

== See also ==
- List of Iranian women royalty
