= Khosrow (son of Bahram IV) =

Shahanshah of the Sasanian Empire in 420 CE

Khosrow 𐭧𐭥𐭮𐭫𐭥𐭣𐭩
- King of Kings of Iranians and non-Iranians

Shahanshah of the Sasanian Empire
- Reign: 420
- Predecessor: Shapur IV
- Successor: Bahram V
- House: House of Sasan
- Father: Bahram IV
- Religion: Zoroastrianism

Khosrow (Middle Persian: 𐭧𐭥𐭮𐭫𐭥𐭣𐭩), was briefly the King of Kings of the Sasanian Empire in 420.

== Biography ==
Khosrow was the son of Bahram IV (r. 388–399), the sixteenth king (shah) of the Sasanian Empire. Since the death of the powerful Sasanian shah Shapur II (r. 309–379), the aristocrats and priests had expanded their influence and authority at the cost of the Sasanian government, nominating, dethroning, and murdering shahs, such as Bahram IV, and also the then reigning shah Yazdegerd I (r. 399–420), who was murdered in 21 January 420. They sought to stop the sons of Yazdegerd I from the ascending the throne—Shapur IV, who was the eldest son of Yazdegerd I and governor of Armenia, quickly rushed to the Sasanian capital of Ctesiphon, and ascended the throne. He was, however, shortly murdered by the nobles and priests, who elected Khosrow as shah.

Bahram V, another son of Yazdegerd I, opposed the decision of the nobles, and asked the Lakhmid king of al-Hirah for military assistance, which he received. At the head of an army of numerous soldiers, Bahram marched towards Ctesiphon, where he promised that he would not reign like his father Yazdegerd I did. According to the Shahnameh ("The Book of Kings"), Bahram suggested that the royal crown and attire should be placed between two lions, and the person that retrieved them by killing the wild animals should be recognized as the shah of Iran. Khosrow chose to pull out, whilst Bahram withstood the trial and won the throne. Nothing is known about the fate of Khosrow.

== Sources ==
- Pourshariati, Parvaneh (2008). Decline and Fall of the Sasanian Empire: The Sasanian-Parthian Confederacy and the Arab Conquest of Iran. London and New York: I.B. Tauris. ISBN 978-1-84511-645-3.
- Klíma, O. (1988). "Bahrām V Gōr". Encyclopaedia Iranica, Vol. III, Fasc. 5. London et al. pp. 514–522.

Khosrow (son of Bahram IV) Sasanian dynasty
Preceded by Shapur IV	King of Kings of Iran and non-Iran; 420	Succeeded by Bahram V
