= Esther =

Biblical Jewish queen of Persia and Medes

- אֶסְתֵּר
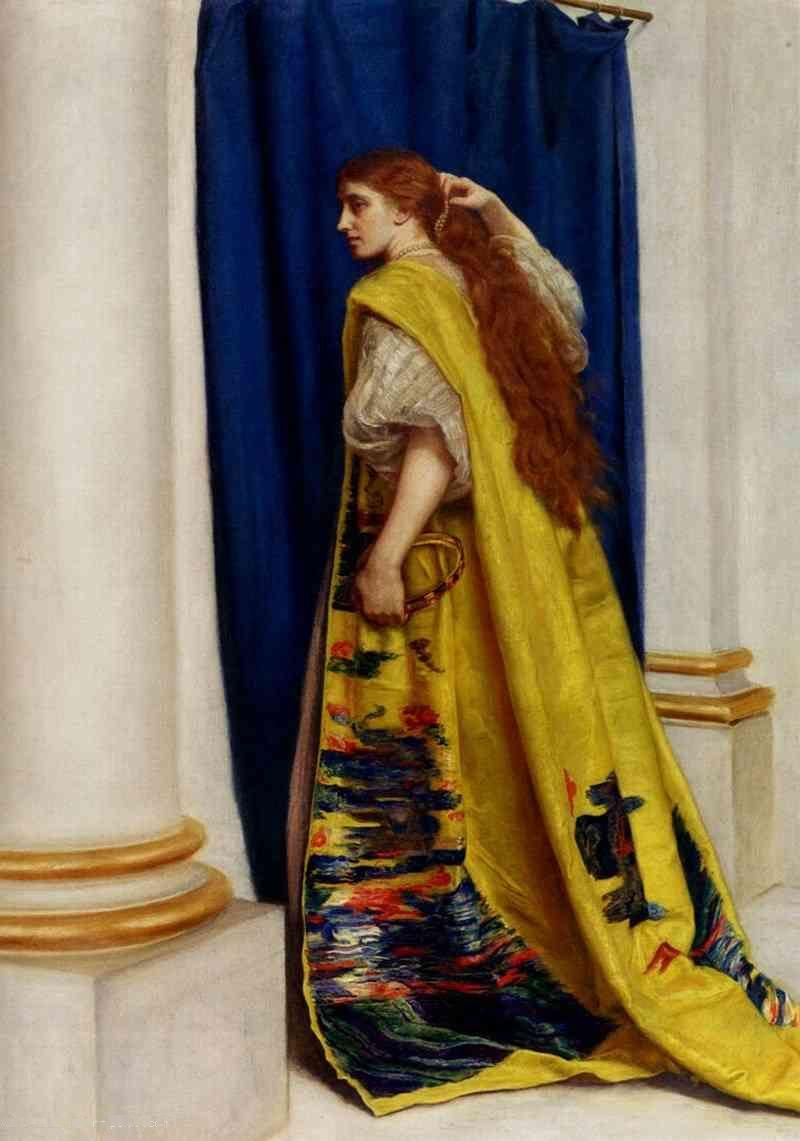
- Esther by John Everett Millais
- Born: Hadassah (הֲדַסָּה); Achaemenid Empire
- Title: Queen of Persia and Medes
- Spouse(s): Ahasuerus of Persia (Either one among: • Xerxes I • Artaxerxes I • Artaxerxes II)
- Parent: Abihail (biological father); Mordecai (adoptive father)

Esther (/ˈɛstər/; Hebrew: אֶסְתֵּר, romanized: ʾEstēr), originally Hadassah (/həˈdɑːsə/; Hebrew: הֲדַסָּה, romanized: Hăḏassā), is the eponymous heroine of the Book of Esther in the Hebrew Bible.

According to the biblical narrative, which is set in the Achaemenid Empire, the Persian king Ahasuerus falls in love with Esther and marries her. His grand vizier Haman is offended by Esther's cousin and guardian Mordecai because of his refusal to bow before him. When confronted, Mordecai's excuse is simply that he was a Jew. Various interpretations have been offered as to what Mordecai's concern was. Consequently, Haman plots to have all of Persia's Jews killed, and eventually convinces Ahasuerus to permit him to do so. However, Esther foils the plan by revealing and decrying Haman's plans to Ahasuerus, who then has Haman executed and grants permission to the Jews to take up arms against their enemies; Esther is hailed for her courage and for working to save the Jews of Persia from eradication.

The Book of Esther's story provides the traditional explanation for Purim, a celebratory Jewish holiday that is observed on the Hebrew date on which Haman's order was to go into effect, which is the day that the Jews killed their enemies after Esther exposed Haman's intentions to her husband; scholars have taken a mixed view as to the Book of Esther's historicity, with debates over its genre and the origins of Purim. (Note: "Because of a lack of substantial relevant contemporaneous extrabiblical historical sources – Persian, Greek, Jewish or other – that could confirm or challenge the reliability of the story as it is presented in the Hebrew Bible, scholars are sharply divided in their opinions on this question. They run from complete acceptance of the book as a historical account, to complete negation of its historical trustworthiness, defining it as fiction." (Kalimi 2023:84) "Some continue to read Esther as a historical account that tells us about persons and events of the past, while others classify the book as a form of historical fiction in which an edifying story is given a realistic historical setting (i.e., as a "novella" or "court tale"). (Hahn & Mitch 2019:72))

Two related forms of the Book of Esther exist: a shorter Biblical Hebrew-sourced version found in Jewish and Protestant Bibles, and a longer Koine Greek-sourced version found in Catholic and Orthodox Bibles.

== Name ==
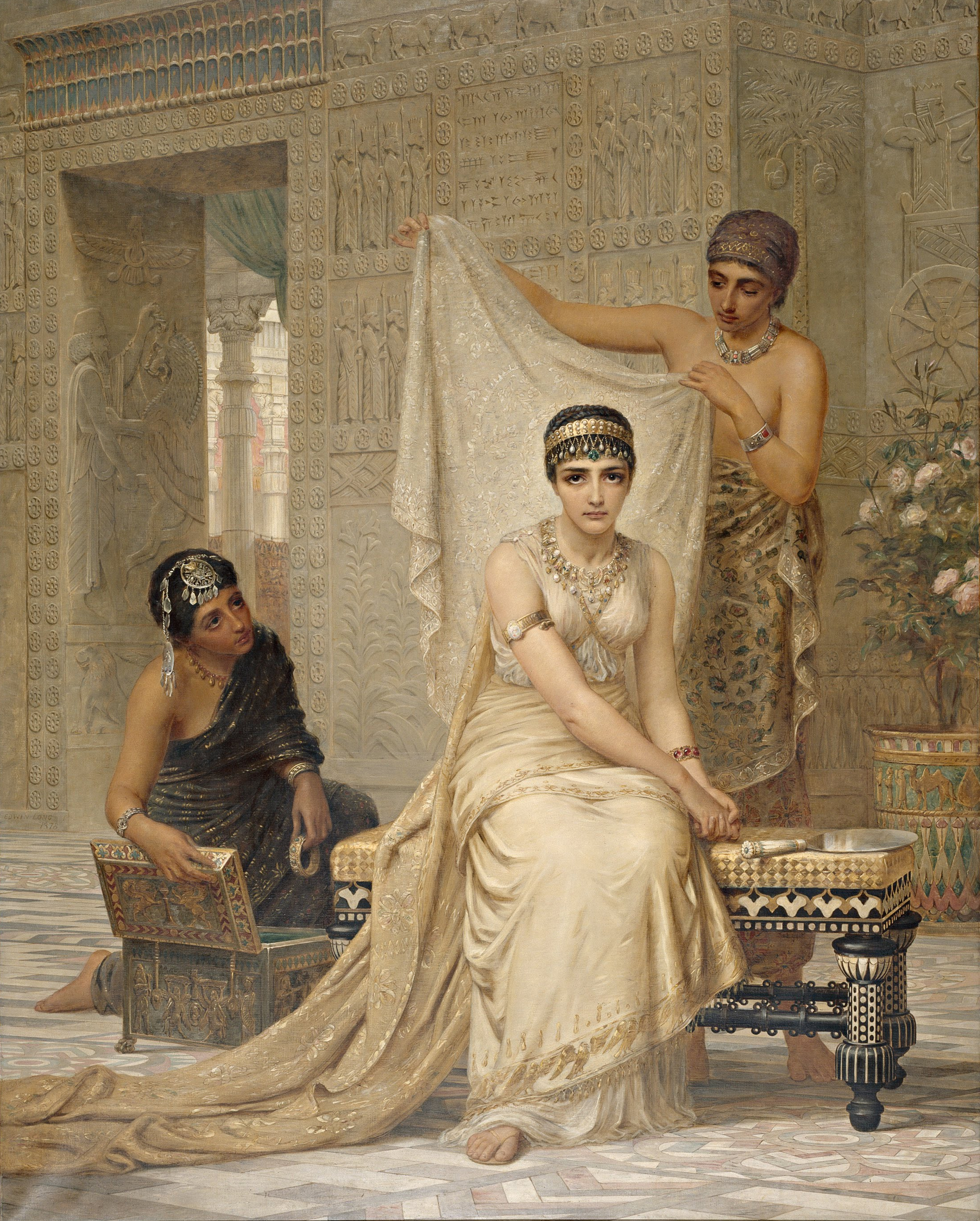
Queen Esther by Edwin Long (1878)

When she is introduced, in Esther 2:7, she is first referred to by the Hebrew name Hadassah, which means 'myrtle tree'. This name is absent from the early Greek manuscripts, although present in the targumic texts, and was probably added to the Hebrew text in the 2nd century CE at the earliest to stress the heroine's Jewishness. The name Esther probably derives from the name of the Babylonian goddess Ishtar or from the Persian word cognate with the English word star (implying an association with Ishtar) though some scholars contend it is related to the Persian words for 'woman' or 'myrtle'.

== Narrative ==
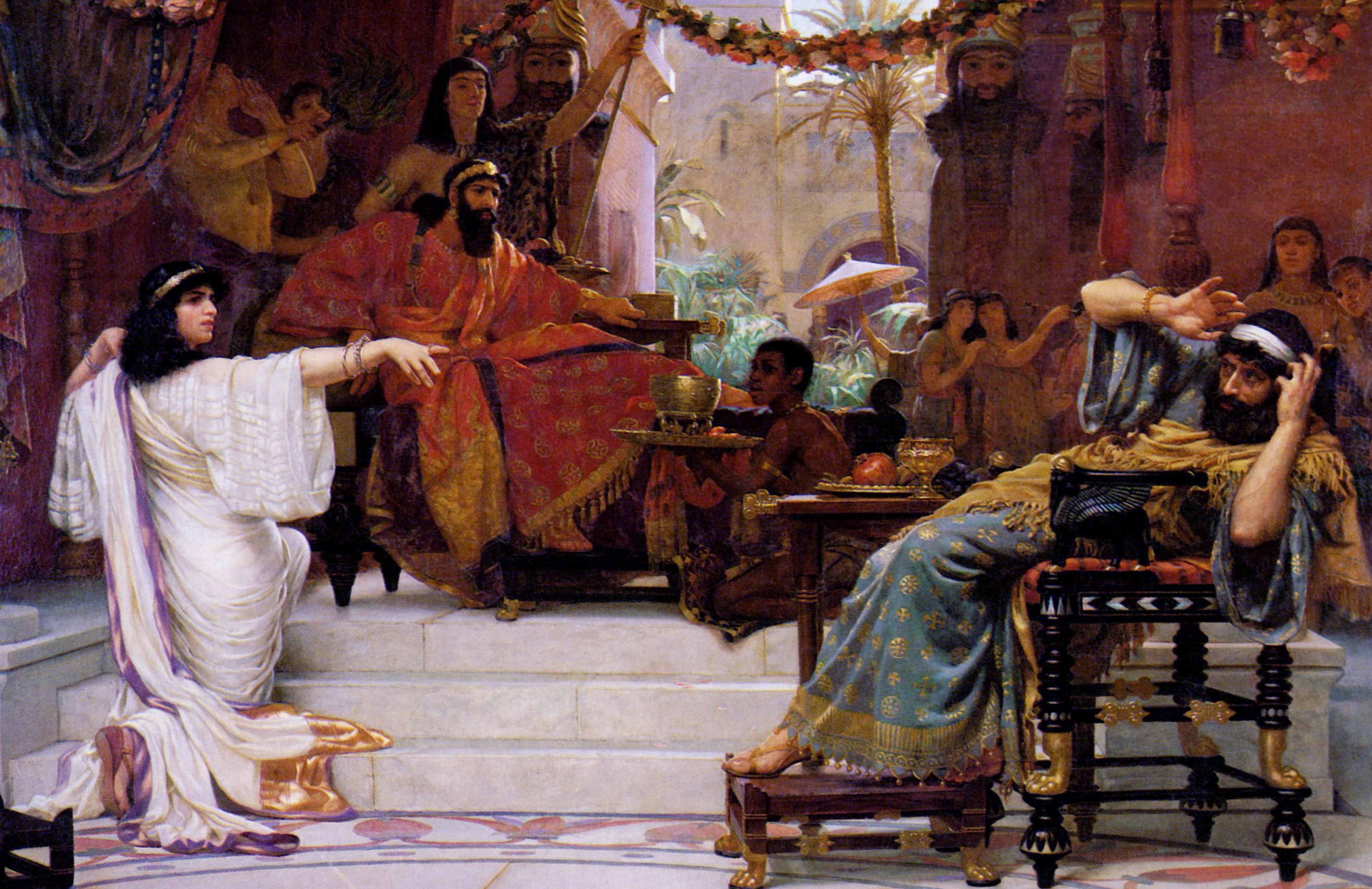
Esther Denouncing Haman (1888) by Ernest Normand

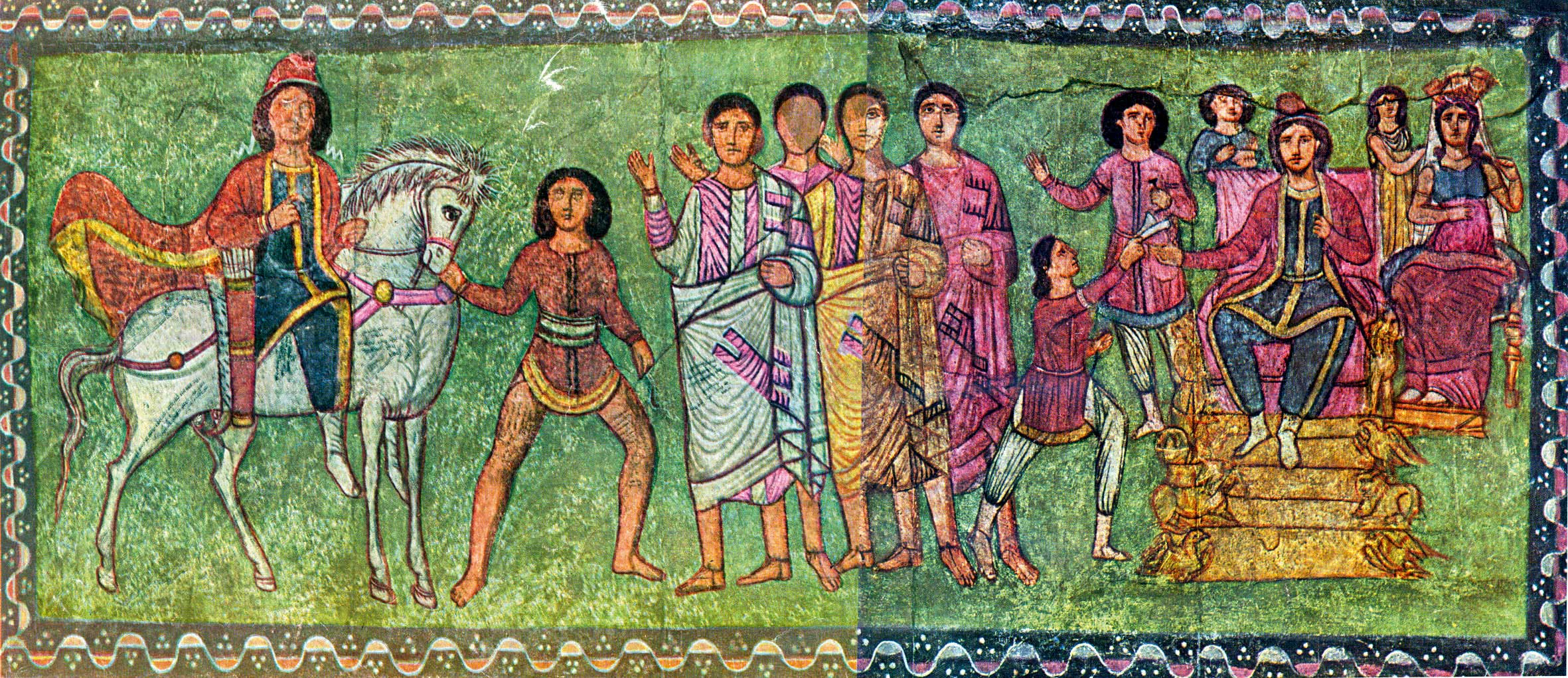
Early 3rd century CE Roman painting of Esther and Mordechai, Dura-Europos synagogue, Syria.

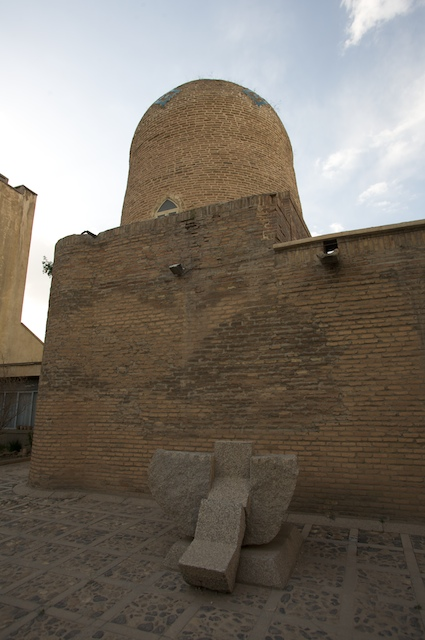
The Shrine venerated as the Tomb of Esther and Mordechai in Hamadan, Iran

In the third year of the reign of King Ahasuerus of Persia, the king banishes his queen, Vashti for refusing to appear before him as summoned, and seeks a new queen. Beautiful maidens gather together at the harem in the citadel of Susa under the authority of the eunuch Hegai.

Esther, a cousin of Mordecai, was a member of the Jewish community in the Exilic Period who claimed as an ancestor Kish, a Benjamite who had been taken from Jerusalem into captivity. She was the orphaned daughter of Mordecai's uncle, Abihail, from the tribe of Gad. According to the biblical narrative, she had a lovely figure and was beautiful. Upon the king's orders, Esther is taken to the palace where Hegai prepares her to meet the king. Even as she advances to the highest position of the harem, perfumed with gold and myrrh and allocated certain foods and servants, she is under strict instructions from Mordecai, who meets with her each day, to conceal her Jewish origins. The king falls in love with her and makes her his Queen.

Following Esther's coronation, Mordecai learns of an assassination plot by Bigthan and Teresh to kill King Ahasuerus. Mordecai tells Esther, who tells the king in the name of Mordecai, and he is saved. This act of great service to the king is recorded in the Annals of the Kingdom.

After Mordecai saves the king's life, Haman the Agagite is made Ahasuerus' highest adviser, and orders that everyone bow down to him. When Mordecai (who had stationed himself in the street to advise Esther) refuses to bow to him, Haman pays King Ahasuerus 10,000 silver talents for the right to exterminate all of the Jews in Ahasuerus' kingdom. Haman casts lots, Purim, using supernatural means, and sees that the thirteenth day of the Month of Adar is a fortunate day for the genocide. Using the seal of the king, in the name of the king, Haman sends an order to the provinces of the kingdom to allow the extermination of the Jews on the thirteenth of Adar. When Mordecai learns of this, he tells Esther to reveal to the king that she is Jewish and ask that he repeal the order. Esther hesitates, saying that she could be put to death if she goes to the king without being summoned; nevertheless, Mordecai urges her to try. Esther asks that the entire Jewish community fast and pray for three days before she goes to see the king; Mordecai agrees.

On the third day, Esther goes to the courtyard in front of the king's palace, and she is welcomed by the king, who stretches out his scepter for her to touch, and offers her anything she wants "up to half of the kingdom". Esther invites the king and Haman to a banquet she has prepared for the next day. She tells the king she will reveal her request at the banquet. During the banquet, the king repeats his offer again, whereupon Esther invites both the king and Haman to a banquet she is making on the following day as well.

Seeing that he is in favor with the king and queen, Haman takes counsel from his wife and friends to build a gallows upon which to hang Mordecai; as he is in their good favors, he believes he will be granted his wish to hang Mordecai the very next day. After building the gallows, Haman goes to the palace in the middle of the night to wait for the earliest moment he can see the king.

That evening, the king, unable to sleep, asks that the Annals of the Kingdom be read to him so that he will become drowsy. The book miraculously opens to the page telling of Mordecai's great service, and the king asks if he had already received a reward. When his attendants answer in the negative, Ahasuerus is suddenly distracted and demands to know who is standing in the palace courtyard in the middle of the night. The attendants answer that it is Haman. Ahasuerus invites Haman into his room. Haman, instead of requesting that Mordecai be hanged, is ordered to take Mordecai through the streets of the capital on the Royal Horse wearing the royal robes. Haman is also instructed to yell, "This is what shall be done to the man whom the king wishes to honor!"

After spending the entire day honoring Mordecai, Haman rushes to Esther's second banquet, where Ahasuerus is already waiting. Ahasuerus repeats his offer to Esther of anything "up to half of the kingdom". Esther tells Ahasuerus that while she appreciates the offer, she must put before him a more basic issue: she explains that there is a person plotting to kill her and her entire people, and that this person's intentions are to harm the king and the kingdom. When Ahasuerus asks who this person is, Esther points to Haman and names him. Upon hearing this, an enraged Ahasuerus goes out to the garden to calm down and consider the situation.

While Ahasuerus is in the garden, Haman throws himself at Esther's feet asking for mercy. Upon returning from the garden, the king is further enraged. As it was the custom to eat on reclining couches, it appears to the king as if Haman is attacking Esther. He orders Haman to be removed from his sight. While Haman is being led out, Harvona, a civil servant, tells the king that Haman had built a gallows for Mordecai, "who had saved the king's life". In response, the king says "Hang him (Haman) on it".

After Haman is put to death, Ahasuerus gives Haman's estate to Esther. Esther tells the king about Mordecai being her relative, and the king makes Mordecai his adviser. When Esther asks the king to revoke the order exterminating the Jews, the king is initially hesitant, saying that an order issued by the king cannot be repealed. Ahasuerus allows Esther and Mordecai to write another order, with the seal of the king and in the name of the king, to allow the Jewish people to defend themselves and fight with their oppressors on the thirteenth day of Adar.

On the thirteenth day of Adar, the same day that Haman had set for them to be killed, the Jews defend themselves in all parts of the kingdom and rest on the fourteenth day of Adar. The fourteenth day of Adar is celebrated with the giving of charity, exchanging foodstuffs, and feasting. In Susa, the Jews of the capital were given another day to kill their oppressors; they rested and celebrated on the fifteenth day of Adar, again giving charity, exchanging foodstuffs, and feasting as well.

The Jews established an annual feast, the feast of Purim, in memory of their deliverance. Haman having set the date of the thirteenth of Adar to commence his campaign against the Jews, this determined the date of the festival of Purim.

== Historicity ==
There is general agreement among scholars that the book of Esther is a work of fiction. (Note: "Today there is general agreement that it is essentially a work of fiction, the purpose of which was to justify the Jewish appropriation of an originally non-Jewish holiday. What is not generally agreed upon is the identity or nature of that non-Jewish festival which came to be appropriated by the Jews as Purim, and whose motifs are recapitulated in disguised form in Esther." (Polish 1999) "The story is fictitious and written to provide an account of the origin of the feast of Purim; the book contains no references to the known historical events of the reign of Xerxes." (Browning 2009) "Although the details of its setting are entirely plausible and the story may even have some basis in actual events, in terms of literary genre the book is not history." (Tucker 2004)) Persian kings did not marry outside of the seven Persian noble families, making it unlikely that there was a Jewish queen Esther. (Note: "Xerxes could not have wed a Jewess because this was contrary to the practices of Persian monarchs who married only into one of the seven leading Persian families. History records that Xerxes was married to Amestris, not Vashti or Esther. There is no historical record of a personage known as Esther, or a queen called Vashti or a vizier Haman, or a high placed courtier Mordecai. Mordecai was said to have been among the exiles deported from Jerusalem by Nebuchadnezzar, but that deportation occurred 112 years before Xerxes became king." (Littman 1975:146)) Further, the name Ahasuerus can be translated to Xerxes, as both derive from the Persian Khshayārsha. Ahasuerus as described in the Book of Esther is usually identified in modern sources to refer to Xerxes I, who ruled between 486 and 465 BCE, as it is to this monarch that the events described in Esther are thought to fit the most closely. However, Xerxes' first queen was Amestris, further highlighting the fictitious nature of the story.

Some scholars speculate that the story was created to justify the Jewish appropriation of an originally non-Jewish feast. The festival which the book explains is Purim, which is explained as meaning "lot", from the Babylonian word puru. One popular theory says the festival has its origins in a historicized Babylonian myth or ritual in which Mordecai and Esther represent the Babylonian gods Marduk and Ishtar, while others trace the ritual to the Persian New Year, and scholars have surveyed other theories in their works. Some scholars have attempted defended the story as real history, but the attempt to find a historical kernel to the narrative is considered "likely to be futile" in a study by Sara Raup Johnson.

Scholar Morteza Arabzadeh Sarbanani argues that the author of the Masoretic Esther was familiar with the workings of the Achaemenid empire, but because this knowledge exists alongside historical errors, Morteza argues it was a deliberate choice so the story functions primarily as a narrative rather than a strict historical record.

== Interpretations ==
The Book of Esther begins by portraying Esther as beautiful and obedient, though a relatively passive figure. Throughout the story, she evolves into a character who takes a decisive role in her own future and that of her people. According to Sidnie White Crawford, "Esther's position in a male court mirrors that of the Jews in a Gentile world, with the threat of danger ever present below the seemingly calm surface."

According to Susan Zaeske, by virtue of the fact that Esther used only rhetoric to convince the king to save her people, the story of Esther is a "rhetoric of exile and empowerment that, for millennia, has notably shaped the discourse of marginalized peoples such as Jews, women, and African Americans", persuading those who have power over them.

John Gill identifies the conversion of Persian allies (Esther 8:17) as an example of 'conversion under duress' but does not discount alternative explanations. They include the new converts being the impressed by the 'Divine Providence' working in the Jews' favor and seeking the blessings of Esther and Mordecai.

== Persian culture ==
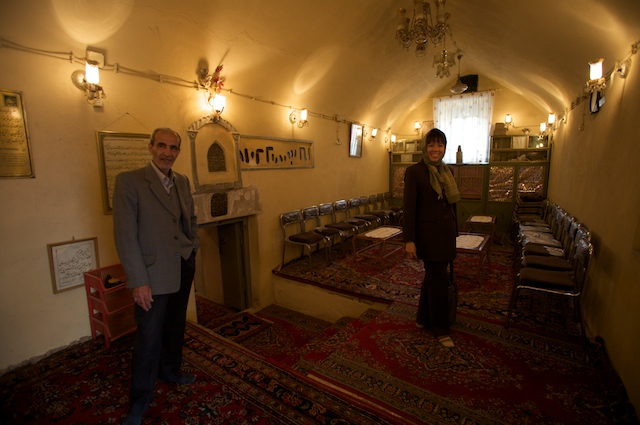
Interior of the structure venerated as the tomb of Esther and Mordechai

Modern day Persian Jews are called "Esther's Children". A building venerated as being the Tomb of Esther and Mordechai is located in Hamadan, Iran, although the village of Kafr Bir'im in northern Israel also claims to be the burial place of Queen Esther.

== Artistic depictions of Esther ==
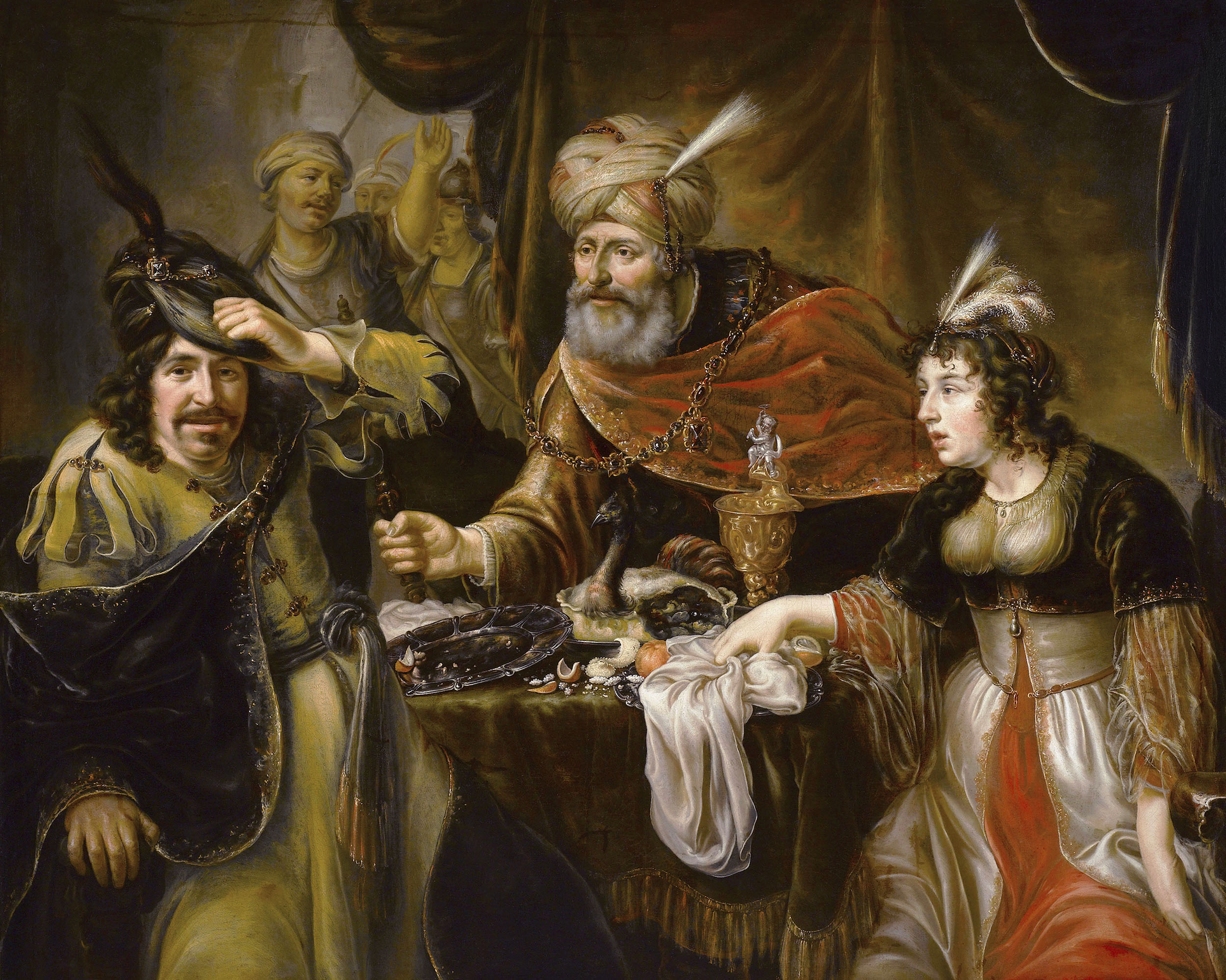
The Feast of Esther by Johannes Spilberg the Younger, c. 1644

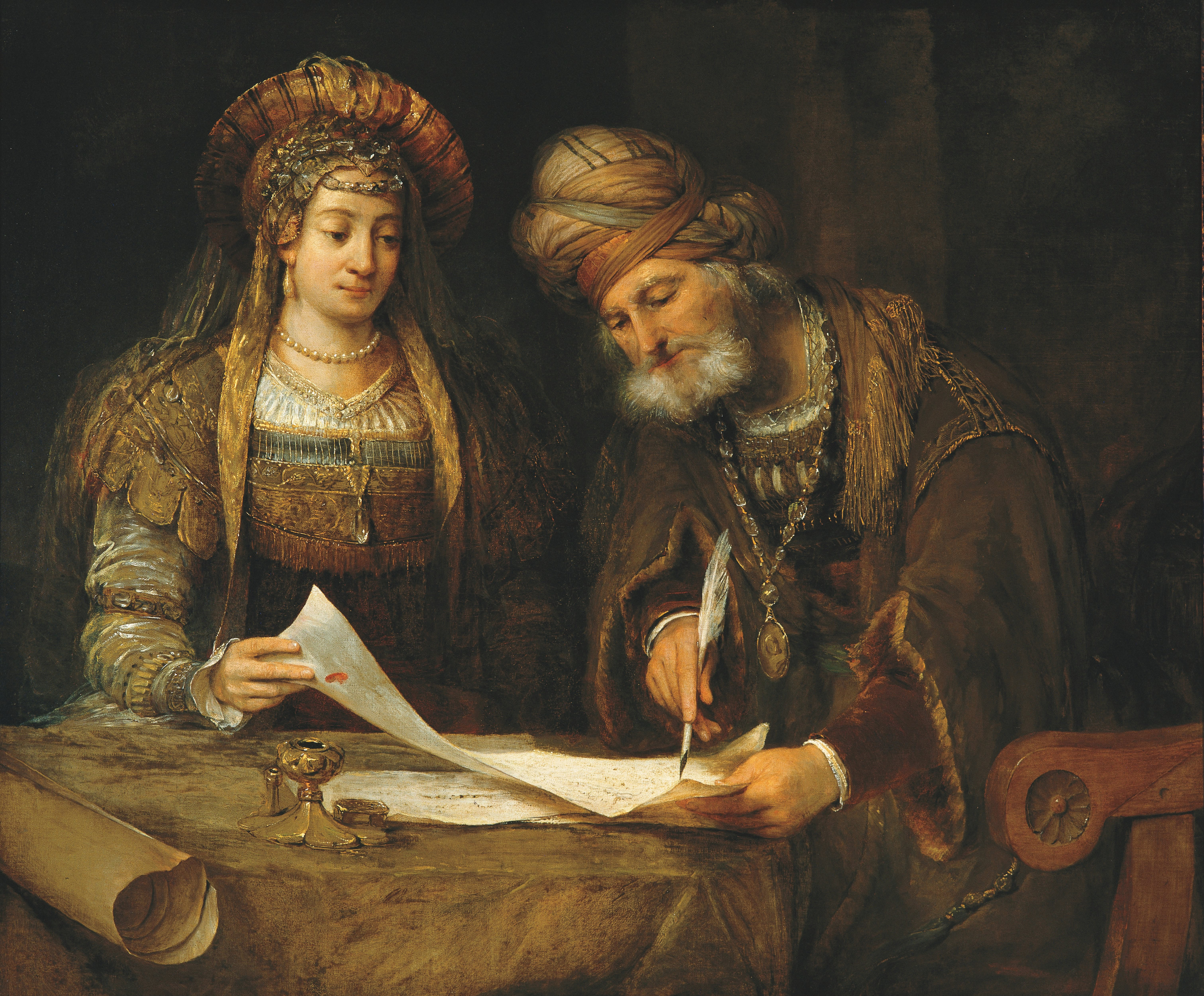
Esther and Mordecai Writing the First Purim Letter by Aert de Gelder, c. 1685

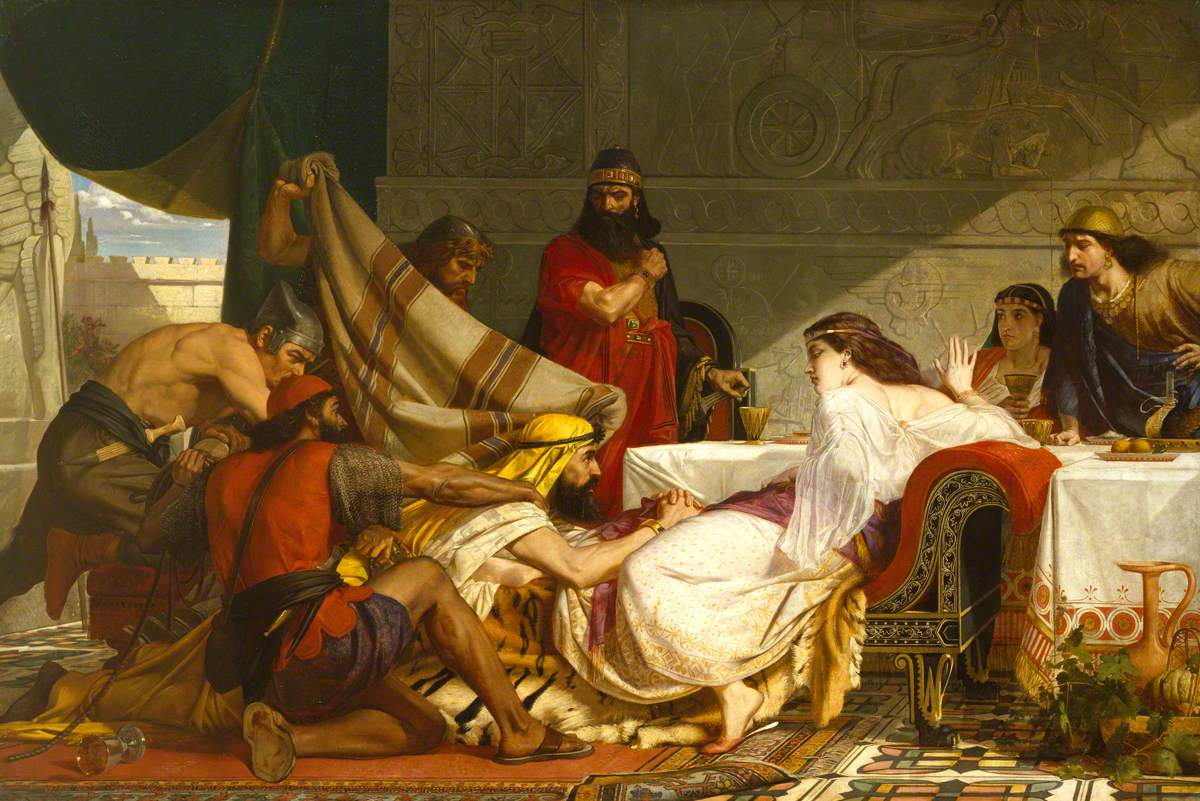
The Festival of Esther by Edward Armitage, 1865

Throughout history, many artists have created paintings depicting Esther. Notable early portrayals include the Heilspiegel Altarpiece by Konrad Witz and Esther Before Ahasuerus by Tintoretto (1546–47, Royal Collection) which show Esther appearing before the king to beg mercy for the Jews, despite the punishment for appearing without being summoned being death. This scene became one of the most commonly depicted parts of the story.

Esther's faint had not often been depicted in art before Tintoretto. It is shown in the series of cassone scenes of the Life of Esther attributed variously to Sandro Botticelli and Filippino Lippi from the 1470s. In other cassone depictions, for example by Filippino Lippi, Esther's readiness to show herself before the court is contrasted to Vashti's refusal to expose herself to the public assembly.

Esther was regarded in Catholic theology as a typological forerunner of the Virgin Mary in her role as intercessor Her regal election parallels Mary's Assumption and as she becomes queen of Persia, Mary becomes queen of heaven; Mary's epithet as 'stella maris' parallels Esther as a 'star' and both figure as sponsors of the humble before the powerful. Contemporary viewers would likely have recognized a similarity between the faint and the common motif of the Swoon of the Virgin, seen in many depictions of the Crucifixion of Jesus. Esther's fainting became a popular subject in the Baroque painting of the following century. A notable Baroque example is Esther Before Ahasuerus by Artemisia Gentileschi.

== In Christianity ==
Esther is commemorated as a matriarch in the Calendar of Saints of the Lutheran Church – Missouri Synod on May 24.

Esther is recognized as a saint in the Eastern Orthodox Church, commemorated on the Sunday before Christmas. The Septuagint edition of Esther contains six parts (totaling 107 verses) not found in the Hebrew Bible. Although these interpretations originally may have been composed in Hebrew, they survive only in Greek texts. Because the Hebrew Bible's version of Esther's story contains neither prayers nor even a single reference to God, Greek redactors apparently felt compelled to give the tale a more explicit religious orientation, alluding to "God" or the "Lord" fifty times." These additions to Esther in the Apocrypha were added approximately in the second or first century BCE.

The story of Esther is also referenced in chapter 28 of 1 Meqabyan, a book considered canonical in the Ethiopian Orthodox Tewahedo Church.

== Music ==
- Marc-Antoine Charpentier, Historia Esther, H.396, for soloist, chorus, strings and continuo, 1677
- Élisabeth Jacquet de La Guerre, "Esther", for soprano and continuo, in Cantates françaises sur des sujets tirés de l'Écriture, book I, 1708
- George Frideric Handel, Esther, with a libretto based on a play by Jean Racine, 1718 and 1732
- Alessandro Stradella, Ester, oratorio, 1673

== See also ==
- Esterka
- Shushandukht
