= Ester (Stradella) =

1673 oratorio by Alessandro Stradella

Ester, liberatrice del popolo ebreo (Esther, Liberator of the Jewish People) is a 1673 Italian-language oratorio by Alessandro Stradella. The only surviving manuscript lacks the original ritornellos and some closed numbers. It was performed in Corpus Christi Catholic Church, New York City, in 1985, and recorded by Italian early music group Il Concento, under Luca Franco Ferrari in 2001, later released on Brilliant Classics in 2012. The work was not performed again in New York City until 2019 and 2020, when it was produced and presented by Salon Sanctuary Concerts at Brotherhood Synagogue, garnering both scholarly and critical praise and for both outings. Navona Records released a complete CD of the oratorio in July 2024. The cast includes Jessica Gould, Sonia Tedla, José Lemos, Gabriele Lombardi, and Salvo Vitale, conducted by Jory Vinikour. Marketing a 2025 event as a Chicago première of the work, Haymarket Opera cut all the choruses and two principal roles, misrepresenting a deeply abridged version of Stradella's Ester to the Chicago public as the complete work.

== Recordings ==
- Alessandro Stradella: Ester – Luca Franco Ferrari, conductor; Silvia Piccollo, Elisa Franzetti, Vicky Norrington, Riccardo Ristori, Matteo Armanino; Il Concerto Luca Franco Ferrari; 22–36 November 2001, Chiesa di San Lorenzo, Torbi di Ceranesi, Genova. Brilliant Classics Cat: 94297
- Alessandro Stradella: Ester Liberatrice del Popolo Ebreo – Jory Vinikour, direction; Jessica Gould, Sonia Tedla, José Lemos, Gabriele Lombardi, Salvo Vitale; Camerata Grimani, recorded 2023 Scuola della Carità, Padova. Navona Records, Cat: NV6629
