= Bahram IV =

Shahanshah of the Sasanian Empire from 388 to 399

Bahram IV 𐭥𐭫𐭧𐭫𐭠𐭭
- King of Kings of Iran and non-Iran (Note: Also spelled "King of Kings of Iranians and non-Iranians".)
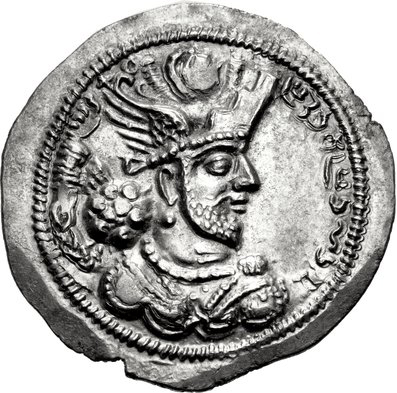
- Drachma of Bahram IV, minted at Herat

Shahanshah of the Sasanian Empire
- Reign: 388–399
- Predecessor: Shapur III
- Successor: Yazdegerd I
- Died: 399
- Issue: Khosrow
- House: House of Sasan
- Father: Shapur III
- Religion: Zoroastrianism

Bahram IV (also spelled Wahram IV or Warahran IV; Middle Persian: 𐭥𐭫𐭧𐭫𐭠𐭭), was the Sasanian King of Kings (shahanshah) of Iran from 388 to 399. He was likely the son and successor of Shapur III (r. 383–388).

Before his accession to the throne, Bahram served as governor of the southeastern province of Kirman. There he bore the title of Kirmanshah (meaning "king of Kirman"), which would serve as the name city he later founded in western Iran.

His reign as shahanshah was largely uneventful. In Armenia, he deposed his insubordinate vassal Khosrov IV and installed his brother Vramshapuh on the Armenian throne. In 395, the Huns invaded the countryside around the Euphrates and the Tigris, but were repelled. It was under Bahram IV that the use of mint signatures became regular, with several new mints established in his empire. Like his father, Bahram IV was killed by the nobility; he was succeeded by his brother Yazdegerd I.

He is notable for being portrayed on two seals, one during his tenure as Kirmanshah; and the other as shahanshah.

== Name ==
His theophoric name "Bahram" is the New Persian form of the Middle Persian Warahrān (also spelled Wahrām), which is derived from the Old Iranian Vṛθragna. The Avestan equivalent was Verethragna, the name of the old Iranian god of victory, whilst the Parthian version was Warθagn. The name is transliterated in Armenian as Vahagn/Vrām, whilst the Greek transliteration is Baranes. The name is attested in Georgian as Baram and Latin as Vararanes.

== Early life ==
According to the medieval historian al-Tabari (d. 923), Bahram was the son of Shapur II (r. 309–379). However, several other historians, such as Hamza al-Isfahani (d. after 961), state that he was the son of Shapur III (r. 383–388), which is thought to be more likely. Bahram, during the reign of his father, was the governor of the southeastern province of Kirman, and may have built the town of Shiragan, which would serve as the capital of the province for the remainder of the Sasanian period. The town played an important economic role, serving as a mint city. The district it governed was an important agricultural region. According to the medieval geographer Yaqut (d. 1229), Bahram had buildings constructed in the city of Veh-Ardashir. Like many other governors of Kirman, Bahram bore the title of Kirmanshah (meaning "king of Kirman"), which would serve as the name of the city he later founded in western Iran. In 388, Bahram succeeded his father, who had been killed by a party of Iranian nobles.

== Reign ==
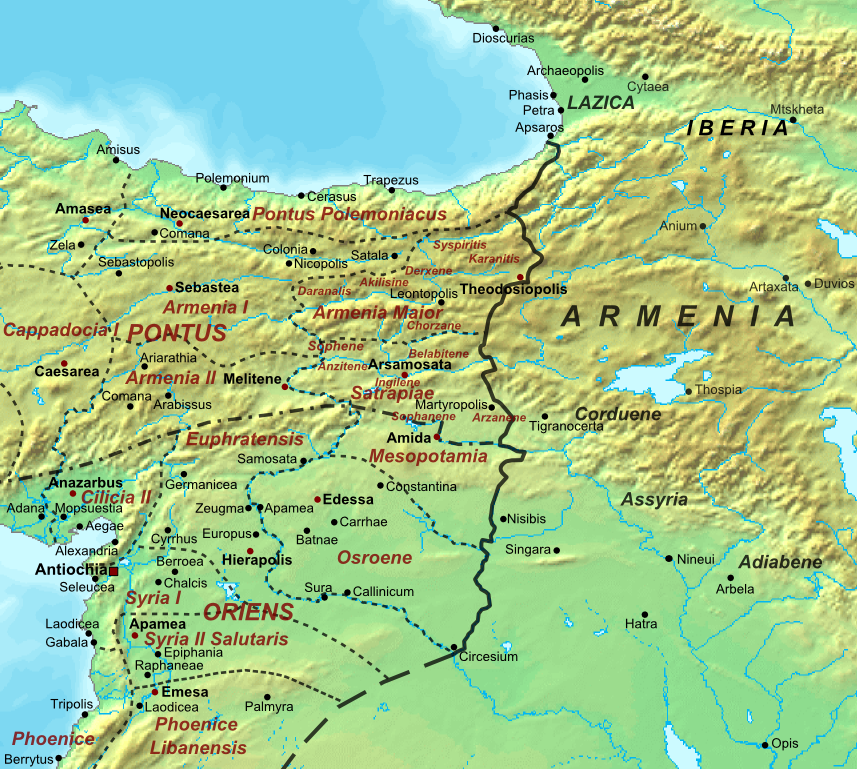
Map of the Roman-Iranian frontier

During the reign of Shapur III, an agreement was made between Iran and Rome to partition Kingdom of Armenia. The boundary stretched through Theodosiopolis in the north and Amida in the south, which meant that most of Armenia remained in Sasanian hands. When this treaty exactly took place is unsure; most scholars believe the treaty was made in 387. The pro-Roman king Arshak III (r. 378–387) of the Arsacid dynasty soon died, which made the Romans abolish their branch of the Arsacid monarchy and create the province of Western Armenia. The Arsacid monarchy in the Iranian part of Armenia (which became known as Persarmenia) was maintained, with Khosrov IV ruling the country as a Sasanian vassal. Bahram IV began to distrust Khosrov IV, which eventually resulted in Khosrov IV's removal and the succession of his brother Vramshapuh. The immediate cause of Khosrov IV's removal may have been his appointment of Sahak as the patriarch of Persarmenia without consulting the Iranian court.

In 395, the Huns invaded the Roman provinces of Sophene, Western Armenia, Mesopotamia, Syria, and Cappadocia. They reached as far Galatia, taking many captives. They then invaded the Iranian realm, devastating much of the countryside around the Euphrates and the Tigris. A counterattack was soon made, which resulted in the defeat of Hunnic forces and the retrieval of their spoils. Bahram IV allowed the Roman captives to stay at Veh-Ardashir and Ctesiphon, where they were given rations, which included bread, wine and oil. Most of the captives were later returned to their own lands. These Hunnic invasions signaled to the Sasanians that areas of Iran that lacked natural defenses had to be better secured.

In 399, Bahram IV was killed by an arrow during a hunting expedition. The 9th-century historian Dinawari calls the incident an accident, while al-Tabari calls the perpetrators "a group of murderous evildoers". Modern scholarship agrees that the nobility was behind the murder. According to the modern historian Scott McDonough, Bahram IV was killed for his attempt to reduce the authority of the powerful Parthian noble families (known as the wuzurgan) who formed the bulk of the Iranian feudal army. Centered on the Iranian plateau, they were largely autonomous. Attempts to curb their authority usually resulted in the shahanshah's murder. Ultimately, the Parthian nobility worked for the shahanshah for personal benefit, personal oath, and, conceivably, a common awareness of the "Aryan" (Iranian) kinship they shared with their Persian overlords. Bahram IV was succeeded by his brother Yazdegerd I, who, aware of the previous actions of the nobility, strived to restrict their power.

== Personality ==
The assessment of Arabic sources towards Bahram IV is mixed, although he is generally portrayed in a positive light. According to al-Tabari "he governed his subjects in commendable fashion and was praised for his rule". The 9th-century scholar Ibn Qutaybah mentions "his pursuit of justice and good rule". Hamza al-Isfahani calls him a "proud but harsh ruler, who neglected his subjects". The 12th-century historian Ibn al-Balkhi, however, calls him a "self-absorbed king who never held mazalim".

== Coinage ==
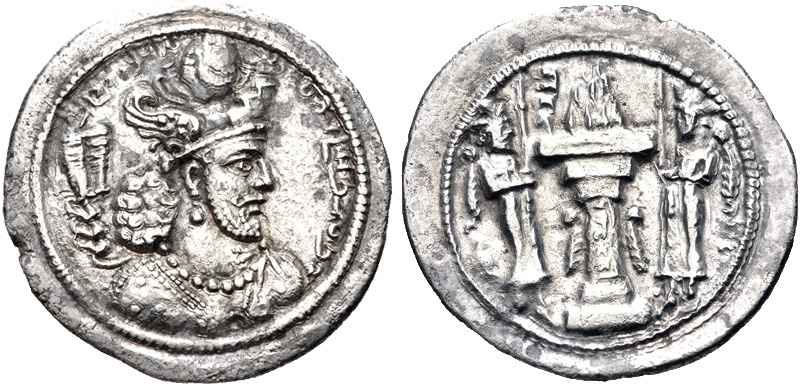
Drachma of Bahram IV, minted at Spahan or Ctesiphon

On his coinage, Bahram IV is portrayed wearing a crown with wings—a reference to Verethragna. The wings are attached to a mural crown, which was a symbol of the supreme god in Zoroastrianism, Ahura Mazda. Bahram IV was the first Sasanian monarch to combine two religious components on his crown. Afterwards such crowns became a common feature among the Sasanians. It was also under him that the use of mint signatures became regular. The regularization of mint signatures allows the origin of coins to be more easily identified. Under Bahram IV, the eastern province of Abarshahr produced its largest proportion of coinage (19%) throughout Sasanian history. The large production of coins in the region was to meet the expenditure needed to maintain the large number of troops stationed there.

Like Shapur II, Ardashir II and Shapur III, Bahram IV also minted unique gold coins in the Indian region of Sindh, which may have corresponded to the Sasanian province of Hind. Under Bahram IV, mints were established in the cities of Gundeshapur and Susa in Khuzistan. A mint was also established in the northwestern province of Adurbadagan to support the construction of the Caspian Gates to protect the Caucasus border against Hunnic incursions.

== Seals ==
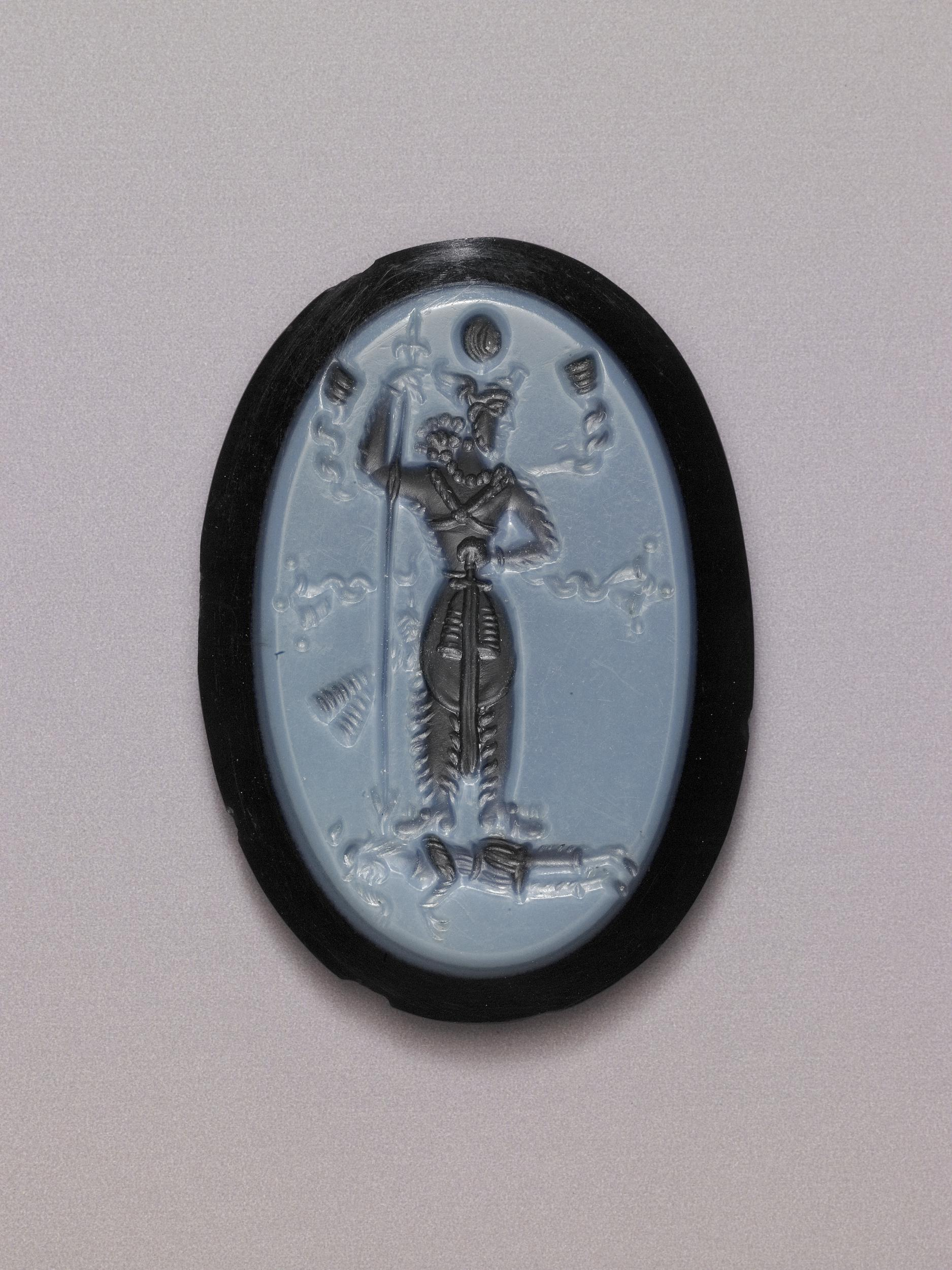
Onyx stamp-seal of Bahram IV wearing his characteristic crown and standing on the body of an unknown fallen foe. Stored in the British Museum

A seal of Bahram during his tenure as Kirmanshah has survived. Written in Middle Persian, its inscription says the following; "Wahrān Kermān Šāh, son of the Mazdā-worshipping Lord Šāpūr, king of kings of Iran and non-Iran, who is a scion of lords". In addition to that, another seal of Bahram IV has been found dating from his rule as shahanshah. This seal, currently located in the British Museum, portrays him with his characteristic crown. He is holding a javelin and standing on the body of an unknown fallen foe. This fallen foe resembles the same figure portrayed on the rock relief of Ardashir II, which most likely depicted the Roman emperor Julian, who fell in battle against the Sasanians in 363. It has been suggested that the figure on Bahram IV's seal may have been Julian as well, added by Bahram IV to emphasize his own legitimacy and ability through his supposed participation in the formers defeat.

== Sources ==
- Badiyi, Bahram (2020). "Cities and Mint Centers Founded by the Sasanians". Ancient Iranian Numismatics: 203–233. doi:10.1163/9789004460720_012. ISBN 978-90-04-46072-0.
- Bonner, Michael (2020). The Last Empire of Iran. New York: Gorgias Press. ISBN 978-1463206161.
- Bosworth, C. E., ed. (1999). The History of al-Ṭabarī, Volume V: The Sāsānids, the Byzantines, the Lakhmids, and Yemen. SUNY Series in Near Eastern Studies. Albany, New York: State University of New York Press. ISBN 978-0-7914-4355-2.
- Brunner, Christopher (1983). "Geographical and Administrative divisions: Settlements and Economy". In Yarshater, Ehsan (ed.). The Cambridge History of Iran: The Seleucid, Parthian and Sasanian Periods. Vol. 3(2). Cambridge: Cambridge University Press. pp. 747–778. ISBN 0-521-24693-8.
- Canepa, Matthew P. (2009). The Two Eyes of the Earth: Art and Ritual of Kingship Between Rome and Sasanian Iran. University of California Press. ISBN 978-0520257276.
- Chaumont, M. L. (1986). "Armenia and Iran ii. The pre-Islamic period". In Yarshater, Ehsan (ed.). Encyclopædia Iranica. Vol. II/4: Architecture IV–Armenia and Iran IV. London and New York: Routledge & Kegan Paul. pp. 418–438. ISBN 978-0-71009-104-8.
- Christensen, Peter (1993). The Decline of Iranshahr: Irrigation and Environments in the History of the Middle East, 500 B.C. to A.D. 1500. Museum Tusculanum Press. ISBN 9788772892597.
- Daryaee, Touraj (2014). Sasanian Persia: The Rise and Fall of an Empire. I.B.Tauris. ISBN 978-0857716668.
- Edwell, Peter (2020). Rome and Persia at War: Imperial Competition and Contact, 193–363 CE. Routledge. ISBN 978-1472418173.
- Frye, R. N. (1983). "The political history of Iran under the Sasanians". In Yarshater, Ehsan (ed.). The Cambridge History of Iran: The Seleucid, Parthian and Sasanian Periods. Vol. 3(1). Cambridge: Cambridge University Press. ISBN 0-521-20092-X.
- Greatrex, Geoffrey; Lieu, Samuel N. C. (2002). The Roman Eastern Frontier and the Persian Wars (Part II, 363–630 AD). New York and London: Routledge (Taylor & Francis). ISBN 0-415-14687-9.
- Hovannisian, Richard G. (1997). The Armenian People from Ancient to Modern Times: Volume I: The Dynastic Periods: From Antiquity to the Fourteenth Century. Palgrave Macmillan. ISBN 978-1403964212.
- Howard-Johnston, James (2014). "The Sasanian state: the evidence of coinage and military construction". Journal of Ancient History. 2 (2). De Gruyter: 144–181. doi:10.1515/jah-2014-0032. S2CID 164026820.
- Jalalipour, Saeid (2015). "The Arab Conquest of Persia: The Khūzistān Province before and after the Muslims Triumph" (PDF). Sasanika.
- Klíma, O. (1988). "Bahrām IV". In Yarshater, Ehsan (ed.). Encyclopædia Iranica. Vol. III/5: Bahai Faith III–Baḵtīārī tribe II. London and New York: Routledge & Kegan Paul. pp. 514–522. ISBN 978-0-71009-117-8.
- Kia, Mehrdad (2016). The Persian Empire: A Historical Encyclopedia [2 volumes]: A Historical Encyclopedia. ABC-CLIO. ISBN 978-1610693912.
- McDonough, Scott (2013). "Military and Society in Sasanian Iran". In Campbell, Brian; Tritle, Lawrence A. (eds.). The Oxford Handbook of Warfare in the Classical World. Oxford University Press. pp. 1–783. ISBN 9780195304657.
- Lenski, Noel Emmanuel (2002). Failure of Empire: Valens and the Roman state in the fourth century A.D. University of California Press. ISBN 978-0-520-23332-4.
- Martindale, J. R.; Jones, A. H. M.; Morris, J. (1971). The Prosopography of the Later Roman Empire: Volume 1, AD 260-395. Cambridge University Press. ISBN 9780521072335.
- Pourshariati, Parvaneh (2008). Decline and Fall of the Sasanian Empire: The Sasanian-Parthian Confederacy and the Arab Conquest of Iran. London and New York: I.B. Tauris. ISBN 978-1-84511-645-3.
- Rapp, Stephen H. (2014). The Sasanian World through Georgian Eyes: Caucasia and the Iranian Commonwealth in Late Antique Georgian Literature. Ashgate Publishing, Ltd. ISBN 978-1472425522.
- Schindel, Nikolaus (2013). "Sasanian Coinage". In Potts, Daniel T. (ed.). The Oxford Handbook of Ancient Iran. Oxford University Press. ISBN 978-0199733309.
- Schindel, Nikolaus (2016). "The Coinages of Paradan and Sind in the Context of Kushan and Kushano-Sasanian Numismatics". In Curtis, Vesta Sarkhosh; Pendleton, Elizabeth J.; Alram, Michael; Daryaee, Touraj (eds.). The Parthian and Early Sasanian Empires: Adaptation and Expansion. Oxbow Books. ISBN 9781785702082.
- Shahbazi, A. Shapur (1986). "Ardašīr II". In Yarshater, Ehsan (ed.). Encyclopædia Iranica. Vol. II/4: Architecture IV–Armenia and Iran IV. London and New York: Routledge & Kegan Paul. pp. 380–381. ISBN 978-0-71009-104-8.
- Shahbazi, A. Shapur (2005). "Sasanian dynasty". In Yarshater, Ehsan (ed.). Encyclopædia Iranica (Online ed.). Encyclopædia Iranica Foundation.
- Wiesehöfer, Josef (2018). "Bahram I". In Nicholson, Oliver (ed.). The Oxford Dictionary of Late Antiquity. Oxford: Oxford University Press. ISBN 978-0-19-866277-8.
- Yarshater, Ehsan, ed. (1988). "Bahrām". Encyclopædia Iranica. Vol. III/5: Bahai Faith III–Baḵtīārī tribe II. London and New York: Routledge & Kegan Paul. pp. 514–522. ISBN 978-0-71009-117-8.
- Yücel, Muhammet (2017). "A Unique Drachm Coin of Shapur I". Iranian Studies. 50 (3): 331–344. doi:10.1080/00210862.2017.1303329. hdl:20.500.12639/991. S2CID 164631548.

Bahram IV Sasanian dynasty Died: 399
Preceded by Shapur III	King of Kings of Iran and non-Iran; 388–399	Succeeded by Yazdegerd I
