= Tomb of Esther and Mordechai =

Historic tomb in Hamadan, Iran

Coordinates: 34.79809°N 48.51290°E

Mausoleum of Esther and Mordechai
- آرامگاه استر و مردخای (Persian); קבר אסתר ומרדכי (Hebrew); Եսթերի և Մուրթքեի թանգարանը (Armenian)
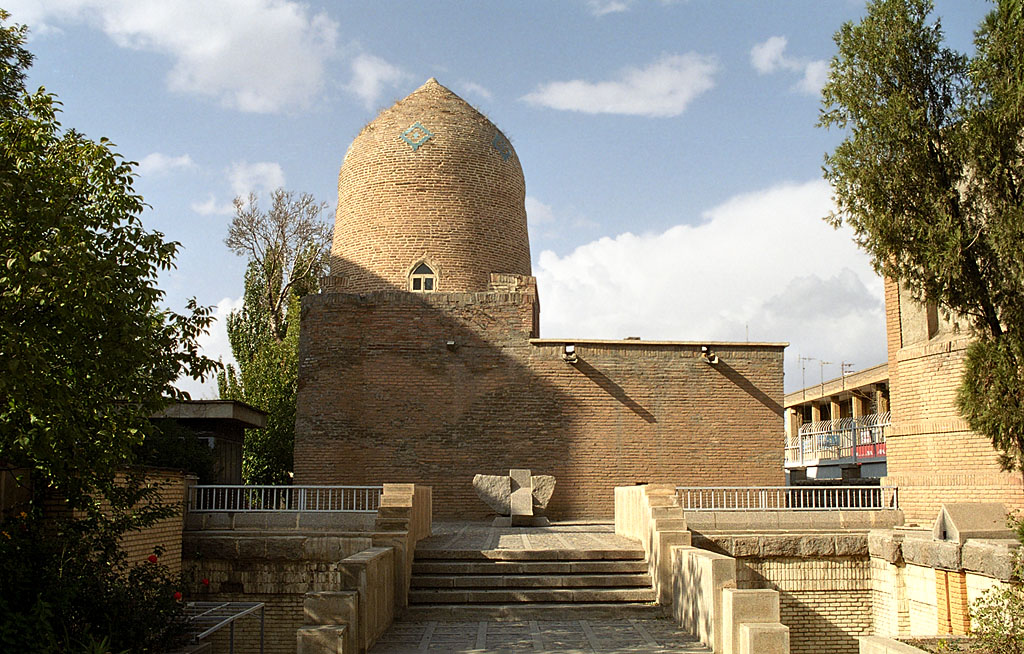
- Mausoleum of Esther and Mordechai
- Interactive map of Mausoleum of Esther and Mordechai
- Type: Mausoleum
- Location: Hamadan, Iran

Site notes
- Owner

Iran National Heritage List
- Official name: Mausoleum of Esther and Mordechai
- Type: Mausoleum
- Designated: 1937
- Reference no.: 291
- Conservation organization: Cultural Heritage, Handicrafts and Tourism Organization of Iran

The Tomb of Esther and Mordechai (Persian: آرامگاه استر و مردخای, Aramgah-e Ester va Murduxay; Hebrew: קבר אסתר ומרדכי Qever Estēr v'Mórdǝḵay; Armenian: Եսթերի և Մուրթքեի թանգարանը Yest'eri yev Murt'k'ev t'angarany) is a tomb located in Hamadan, Iran. Iranian Jews and Iranian Christians believe it houses the remains of the biblical Queen Esther and her cousin Mordechai, and it is the most important pilgrimage site for Jews and Christians in Iran. There is no mention of it in either the Babylonian or Jerusalem Talmud, and the Iranian Jewish tradition has not been supported by Jews beyond Iran.

== History ==
A tomb of Esther and Mordechai is at Hamadan, within a mausoleum believed to have been built in the 1600s, and is first attested in the 11th century. Benjamin of Tudela visited the city, in which he reckoned there were 50,000 Jewish inhabitants, and described the tomb as in front of the synagogue. Shahin Shirazi, in his 14th century Ardashir-nāmah, was the first known Persian Jew to write of the dreams of Esther and Mordechai and of a journey they made to Hamadan, stating they died in the synagogue and within an hour of each other. The narrative of Shirazi may derive from earlier Judaeo-Persian sources, now vanished. According to the National Library of Israel, a French explorer at the outset of the 20th century discovered jewels in a niche located in the mausoleum's ceiling, and deposited them in the Louvre. A crown among the cache, it adds, is believed by the Hamadan Jewish community to have belonged to Esther.

In 1850, J. J. Benjamin visited the place, writing that some 500 Jewish families lived there, with three synagogues. The tombs he described as situated in a magnificent building just inside the city walls, which the local Jews visited monthly, and where on Purim the Book of Esther was read and the tombs were struck with the faithful's palms. Ten years later, Yehiel Fischel Castelman also praised the tombs' magnificence, quoting the locals' tradition that it was built by one Cyrus, Esther's son; a date was inscribed on the dome, but he was unable to read it. Jakob Eduard Polak, in the same decade, described the shrine as the only place to which Persian Jews made pilgrimages and wrote of it as the centre of the Jewish quarter and their sole national holy place in Persia. He recorded inscriptions on the oaken coffins inside: the final sections of the Book of Esther, together with names of three donors who had contributed to refurbishment, and a date of 1309/10 CE. In a separate room, the date 1140 CE was inscribed. The Iranian government maintains that the current structure dates back to the Ilkhanate, and a Hebrew inscription dating the construction of the structure to "1618" (א׳תרי״ח) was recorded by a traveler in 1910, though it is unclear what calendar was used for this date.

In 1891, the tomb was described as consisting of an outer and inner chamber surmounted by a dome about 50 feet (15 m) high. The dome had been covered with blue tiles, but most of them had fallen away. A few tombs of worthy Jews were located within the outer chamber. Menahem ha-Levi, a rabbi of Hamadan, wrote in 1932 that the building was 20 m high, that there was an inscription of Isaiah 26 on the doorway, that the first room had been built two centuries previous above the graves of a physician and a messenger from Hebron, and that a 19th-century Hamadan chief rabbi was buried in the centre of the room. Between the main tombs he described an opening into a cave beneath, which could be accessed for maintenance. The archaeologist Ernst Herzfeld rejected the notion that the cenotaphs were connected with Esther and Mordechai, arguing that they were buried in Susa, and argued instead it was the tomb of Shushandukht, daughter of the late antique Exilarch Huna bar Nathan, wife of Yazdegerd I, and mother of Bahram V. According to Stuart C. Brown, the site is indeed more probably the sepulchre of Shushandukht, Jewish consort of the Sasanian king Yazdegerd (399–420). Local legend has it the pit between the two tombs opens into a way that leads directly to Jerusalem.

The city of Hamadan in which the shrine is located, is the ancient Hagmatana/Ecbatana, the capital of the Median Empire which also served as one of the three, simultaneous capitals of the succeeding Achaemenid Empire. This is the dynasty to which the Bible assigns the story of Esther and Mordechai which is the basis of the Jewish feast of Purim today.

The tomb along with the Bandar Abbas Vishnu Temple and a Christian cemetery in Eslamshahr were the target of arson attacks in mid-May 2020. Destruction was minimal and limited to smoke damage, the blaze itself reportedly resulting in no significant injury to the structure. Although multiple Jewish organizations around the world condemned the incident and demanded a swift investigation, Iran's government did not respond to the report or the calls for arrests. Investigation by Hamadanian officials confirmed minor smoke damage and announced restoration work would commence the same week, but refrained from commenting on the cause of the fire. Images of the complex's entrance revealed a Star of David located in the entryway's transom had been partially destroyed and two small graffiti on either side of the doorpost — one a picture of Qasem Soleimani captioned "hard revenge" and the other a picture of Hezbollah general-secretary Hassan Nasrallah captioned "the promise, fulfilled" — although the damage to the Star of David dated to 2017. In October 2023, the tombs were desecrated as a consequence of the Gaza war. On 3 April 2024, subsequent to the 2024 Israeli bombing of the Iranian embassy in Damascus, the shrine was again attacked by assailants with Molotov cocktails. The governor of Hamadan reported minor damage after the perpetrators were observed on video surveillance. The mausoleum is an important pilgrimage destination particularly for Iranian Jews and Iranian Christians. On 14 March 2025, Iranian Chief Rabbi read the Book of Esther at the Tombs of Mordecai and Esther.

== Alternative location ==
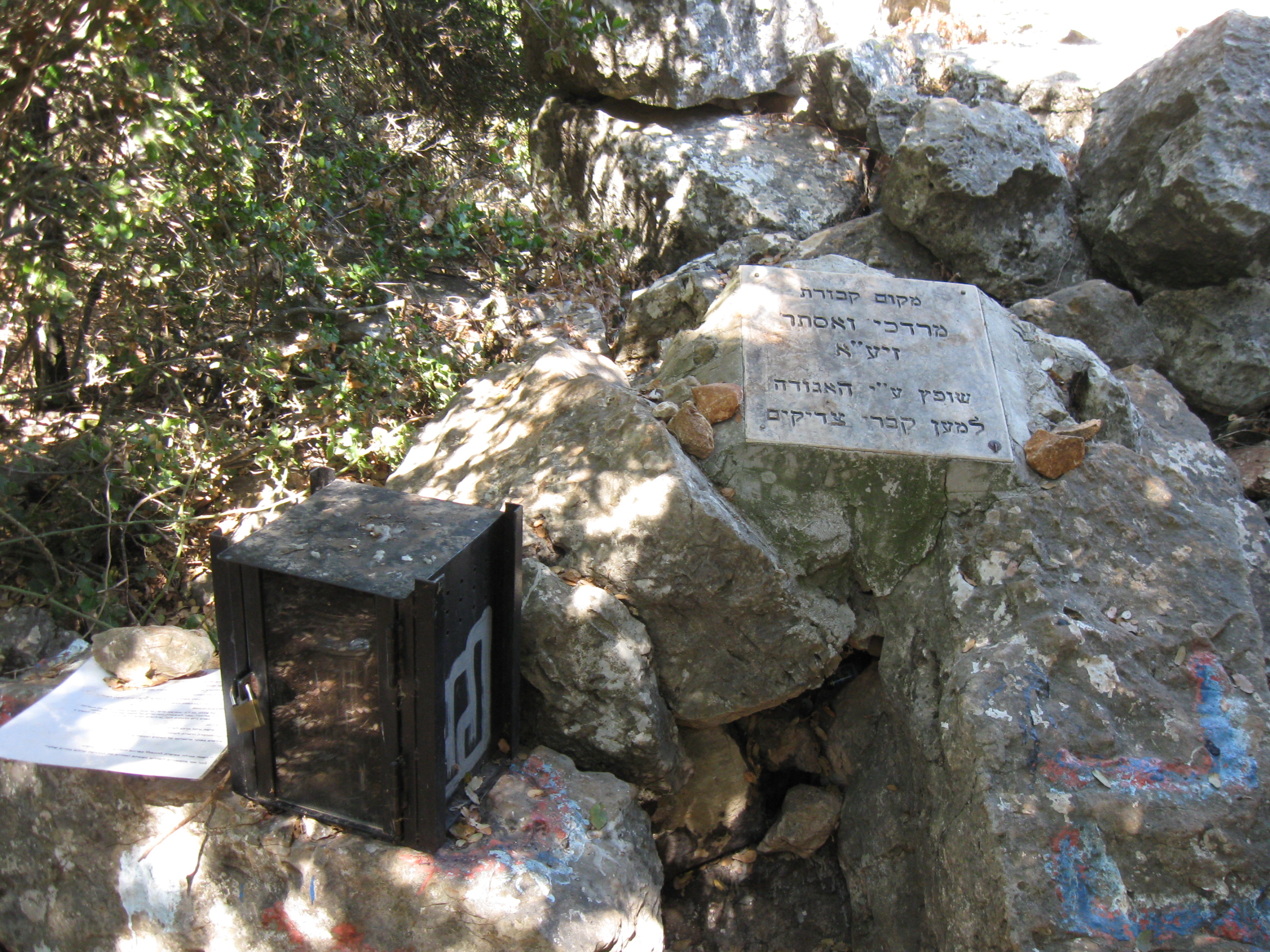
Tomb of Esther and Mordechai in Bar'am

Another tradition first recorded during the Middle Ages places the graves of Esther and Mordechai in the Galilean archaeological site of Kfar Bar'am, close to the kibbutz of the same name, Bar'am, along Israel's northern border with Lebanon.

== Gallery ==
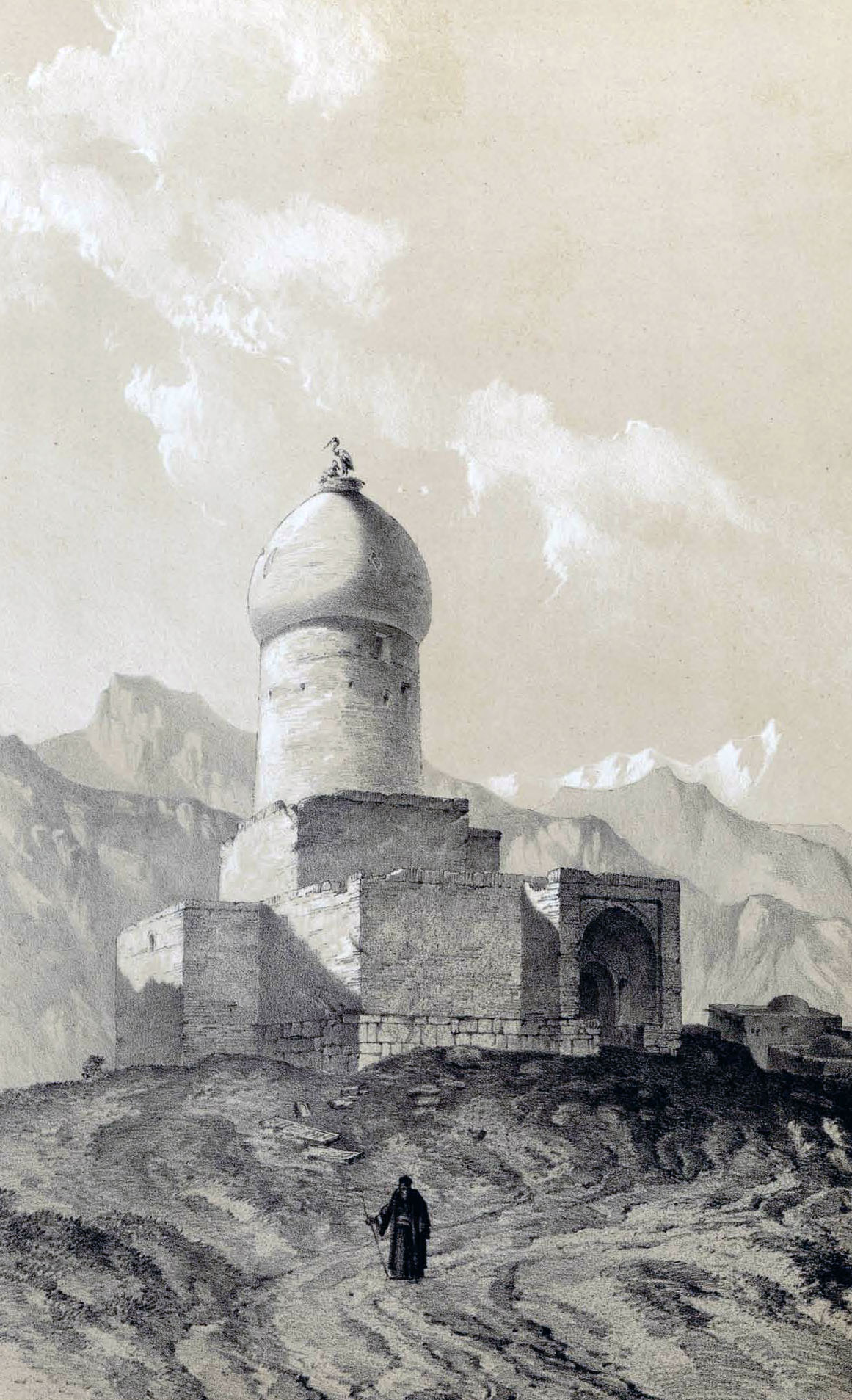
Eugène Flandin (1840)

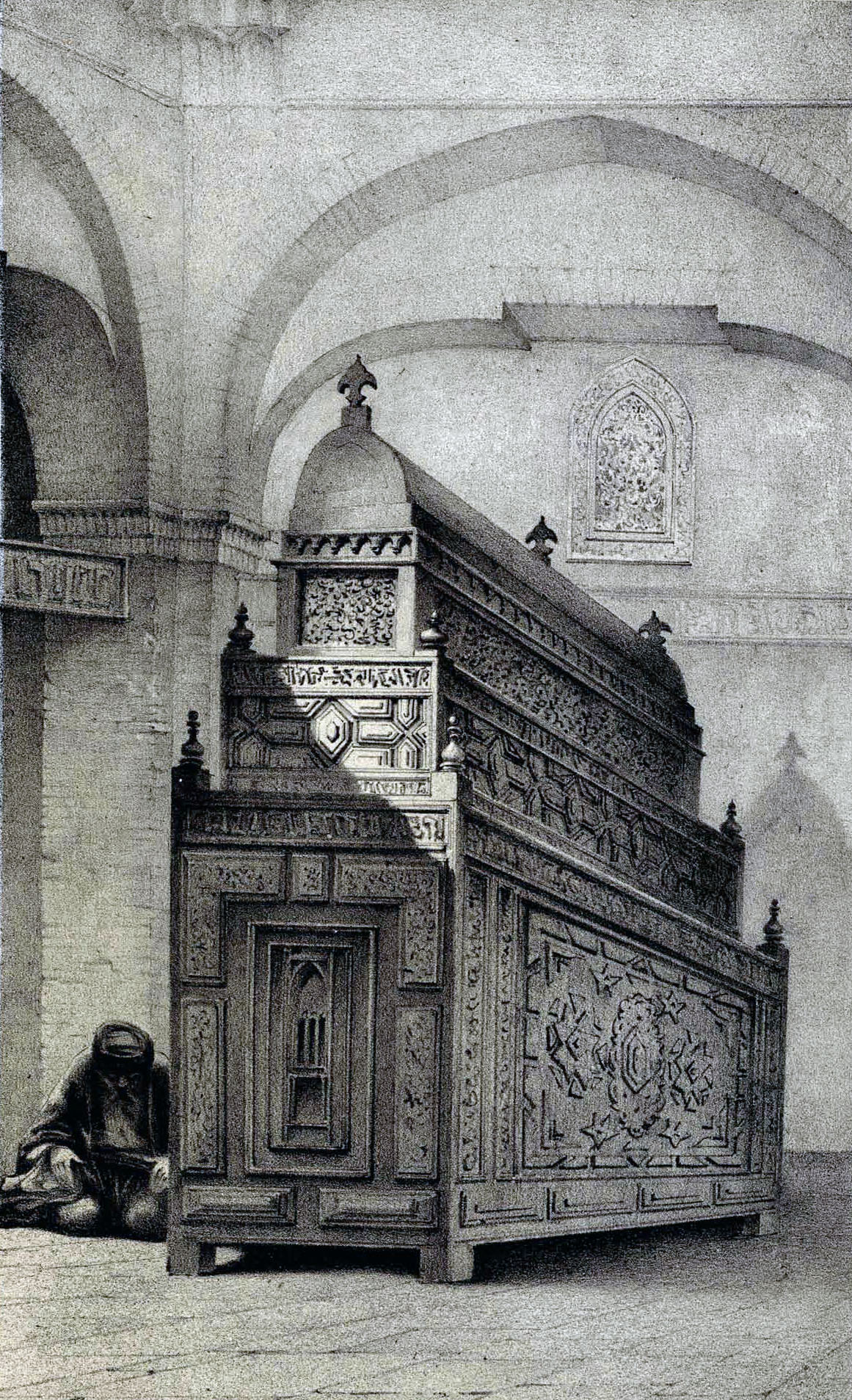
Eugène Flandin (1840)

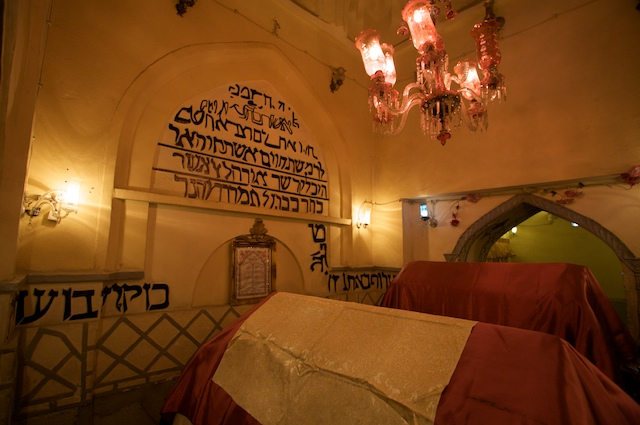
Interior (2008)
