= Susan Zaeske =

American academic

Susan Zaeske is Professor of Rhetoric and Public Culture in the Department of Communication Arts and Arts and was formerly Associate Dean for Arts and Humanities in the College of Letters & Science at the University of Wisconsin-Madison.

== Background ==
Originating from Sheboygan, Wisconsin, Zaeske earned her Bachelor of Arts degree in communication arts and journalism with a certificate in Women’s Studies at the University of Wisconsin-Madison. In both high school and college, she competed in forensics and debate, which fostered her interest in rhetorical studies. Before entering graduate school, Zaeske was employed as a reporter and copy editor for the Milwaukee Journal, the Racine Journal-Times, the St. Paul Pioneer Press, and the Wisconsin State Journal. Zaeske earned her master's degree and doctoral degrees from the University of Wisconsin, winning an American Association of University Women Fellowship to support completion of her dissertation. She joined the faculty of UW-Madison in the Department of Communication Arts in 1996.

Zaeske’s research explores history, rhetoric, gender, race, and political culture. She is the author of Signatures of Citizenship: Petitioning, Antislavery, and Women’s Political Identity, published in the Gender and American Culture series by the University of North Carolina Press. An interdisciplinary scholar, Zaeske has published numerous articles and book chapters in scholarly venues in the fields of history, English, political science, and communication.

Zaeske is the recipient of several national awards for her scholarship including the National Communication Association’s James A. Winans-Herbert A. Wichelns Memorial Award for Distinguished Scholarship in Rhetoric and Public Address, the Marie Hochmuth Nichols Book Award, the Golden Anniversary Monograph Award, the Karl Wallace Memorial Award for Outstanding Young Scholar in Rhetorical Studies, and a research fellowship and visiting professorship in the Women’s Studies and Religion Program at Harvard Divinity School. Zaeske has also received the Hamel Family Faculty Research Fellowship and the Mark H. Ingraham Distinguished Faculty Award from the College of Letters & Science.

In 2011, Zaeske was appointed Associate Dean for Advancement, Arts and Humanities in the College of Letters & Science at the University of Wisconsin-Madison. In that role, she was responsible for directing communication, alumni and student engagement and fundraising for the college as whole with its more than 200,000 living alumni. At the same time, she served as academic associate dean for 33 departments, centers, institutes and programs. Zaeske succeeded in building an office of advancement, which plays an important role in the health of the college and campus as public institutions move away from being funded primarily by state dollars.

In 2016, she stepped away from working in advancement to focus exclusively on arts and humanities. There she worked with colleagues to significantly restructure the division, merging several departments and opening new ones in transnational Asian studies and language sciences.

== Scholarly work ==
Susan Zaeske was Associate Dean for Arts and Humanities in the College of Letters & Science at the University of Wisconsin-Madison but was relieved of those duties in 2023. During her eleven years as associate dean, she significantly restructured the Arts and Humanities division as well as forming an advancement office for the college as a whole.

Zaeske, who joined the faculty of UW-Madison in the Department of Communication Arts in 1996, has published numerous articles and book chapters in scholarly venues in the fields of rhetoric, history, English, political science, religious studies, and Jewish studies. Her research centers on the interplay of rhetoric, history, political culture, and religion. She is the author of Signatures of Citizenship: Petitioning, Antislavery, and Women’s Political Identity, published in the Gender and American Culture series by the University of North Carolina Press. Her current book project explores rhetorical appropriations of the Book of Esther, which she contemplates in “Esther's Book: A Rhetoric of Writing for Jewish Feminists” published in Jewish Rhetorics: History, Theory, Practice (Brandeis University Press, 2014). Recent scholarly presentations include “Signatures and Swords: The Interplay of Petitioning and Violence” to the Radcliffe Exploratory Seminar at Harvard University and “Signatures and Swords: The Interplay of Petitioning and Violence” at Zhejiang University, Hangzhou, China.

Zaeske has won the National Communication Association’s James A. Winans-Herbert A. Wichelns Memorial Award for Distinguished Scholarship in Rhetoric and Public Address, the Marie Hochmuth Nichols Book Award, the Golden Anniversary Monograph Award, the Karl Wallace Memorial Award for Outstanding Young Scholar in Rhetorical Studies, and a research fellowship and visiting professorship in the Women’s Studies and Religion Program at Harvard Divinity School.

Recipient of the Chancellor’s Distinguished Teaching Award and a Lilly Teaching Fellowship, Zaeske has taught the popular lecture course Great Speakers and Speeches as well as courses on African-American rhetoric, women’s discourse, presidential rhetoric, and social movement discourse. She has facilitated experiential education courses on African-American and LGBTQ civil rights history in which she had led students on bus trips to the Deep South and major East coast cities to meet movement activists and visit historical sites.
