= Crime fiction =

Literary genre

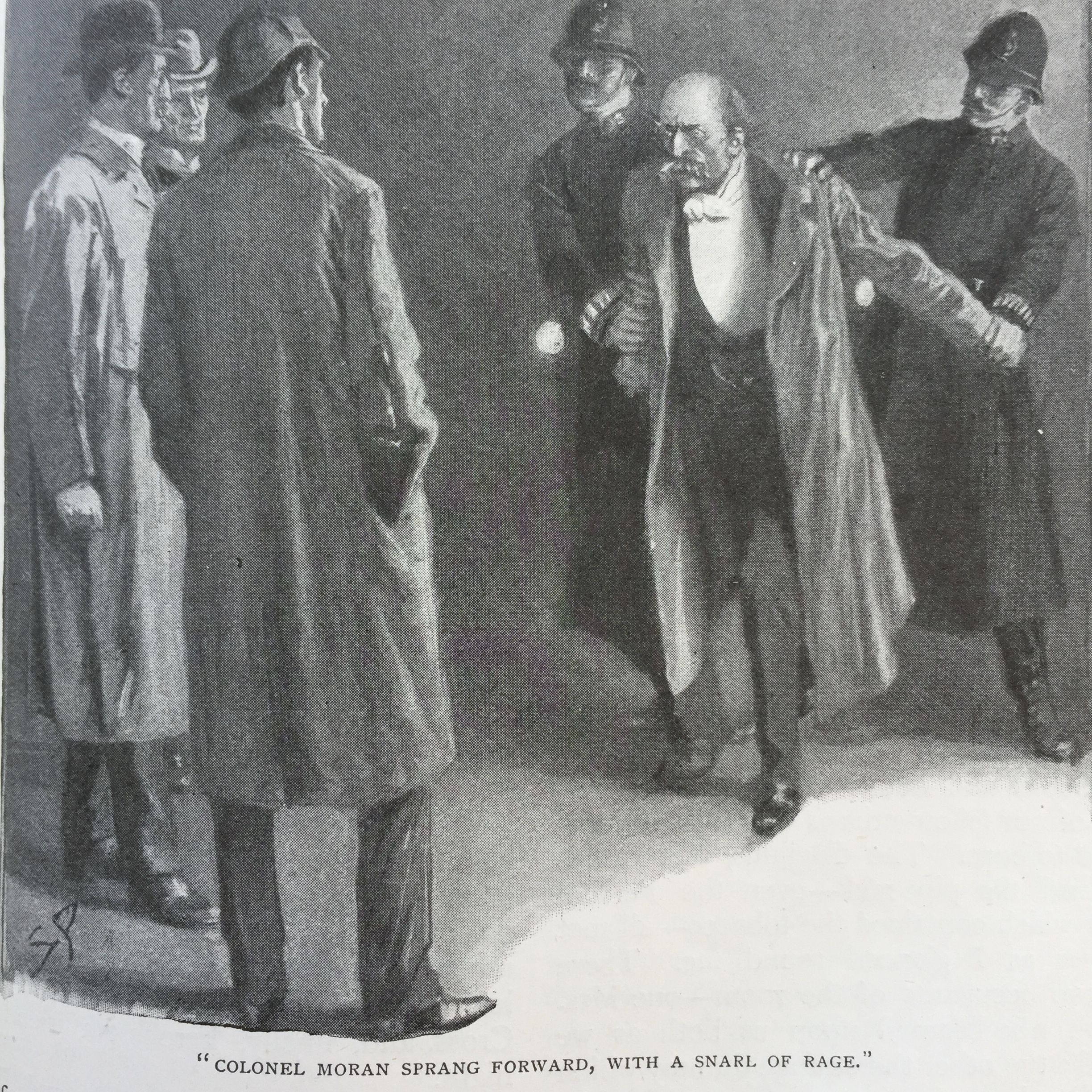
Sherlock Holmes (foreground) oversees the arrest of a criminal; this hero of crime fiction popularized the genre.

Crime fiction, detective story, murder mystery, crime novel, mystery novel, and police novel are terms used to describe narratives or fiction that centre on criminal acts and especially on the investigation, either by an amateur or a professional detective, of a crime, often a murder. Most crime drama focuses on criminal investigation and does not feature the courtroom. Suspense and mystery are key elements that are nearly ubiquitous to the genre.

It is usually distinguished from mainstream fiction and other genres such as historical fiction and science fiction, but the boundaries are indistinct. Crime fiction has several subgenres, including detective fiction (such as the whodunit), courtroom drama, hard-boiled fiction, and legal thrillers.

== History ==
Proto-science and crime fictions have been composed across history, and in this category can be placed texts as varied as the Epic of Gilgamesh from Mesopotamia, the Book of Tobit, Urashima Tarō from ancient Japan, the One Thousand and One Nights (Arabian Nights), and more.

One example of a story in this genre is the medieval Arabic tale of "The Three Apples", one of the tales narrated by Scheherazade in the Arabian Nights. In this tale, a fisherman discovers a heavy locked chest along the Tigris River, and he sells it to the Abbasid Caliph, Harun al-Rashid, who then has the chest broken open, only to find inside it the dead body of a young woman who was cut into pieces. Harun orders his vizier, Ja'far ibn Yahya, to solve the crime and find the murderer within three days, or be executed if he fails his assignment. The story has been described as a "whodunit" murder mystery with multiple plot twists. The story has detective fiction elements.

Two other Arabian Nights stories, "The Merchant and the Thief" and "Ali Khwaja", contain two of the earliest fictional detectives, who uncover clues and present evidence to catch or convict a criminal, with the story unfolding in normal chronology and the criminal already being known to the audience. The latter involves a climax where titular detective protagonist Ali Khwaja presents evidence from expert witnesses in a court. "The Hunchback's Tale" is another early courtroom drama, presented as a suspenseful comedy.

The earliest known modern crime fiction is E. T. A. Hoffmann's 1819 novella "Mademoiselle de Scudéri". Also, Thomas Skinner Surr's anonymous Richmond is from 1827; another early full-length short story in the genre is The Rector of Veilbye by Danish author Steen Steensen Blicher, published in 1829. A further example of crime detection can be found in Letitia Elizabeth Landon's story The Knife, published in 1832, although here the truth remains in doubt at the end. Another early crime novel is "The Murder of Engine Maker Roolfsen" by Norwegian author Maurits Hansen, published in 1839.

Better known are the earlier dark works of Edgar Allan Poe. His brilliant and eccentric detective C. Auguste Dupin, a forerunner of Arthur Conan Doyle's Sherlock Holmes, appeared in works such as "The Murders in the Rue Morgue" (1841), "The Mystery of Marie Rogêt" (1842), and "The Purloined Letter" (1844). With his Dupin stories, Poe provided the framework for the classic detective story. The detective's unnamed companion is the narrator of the stories and a prototype for the character of Dr. Watson in later Sherlock Holmes stories.

Wilkie Collins' epistolary novel The Woman in White was published in 1860, while The Moonstone (1868) is often thought to be his masterpiece. French author Émile Gaboriau's Monsieur Lecoq (1868) laid the groundwork for the methodical, scientifically minded detective.

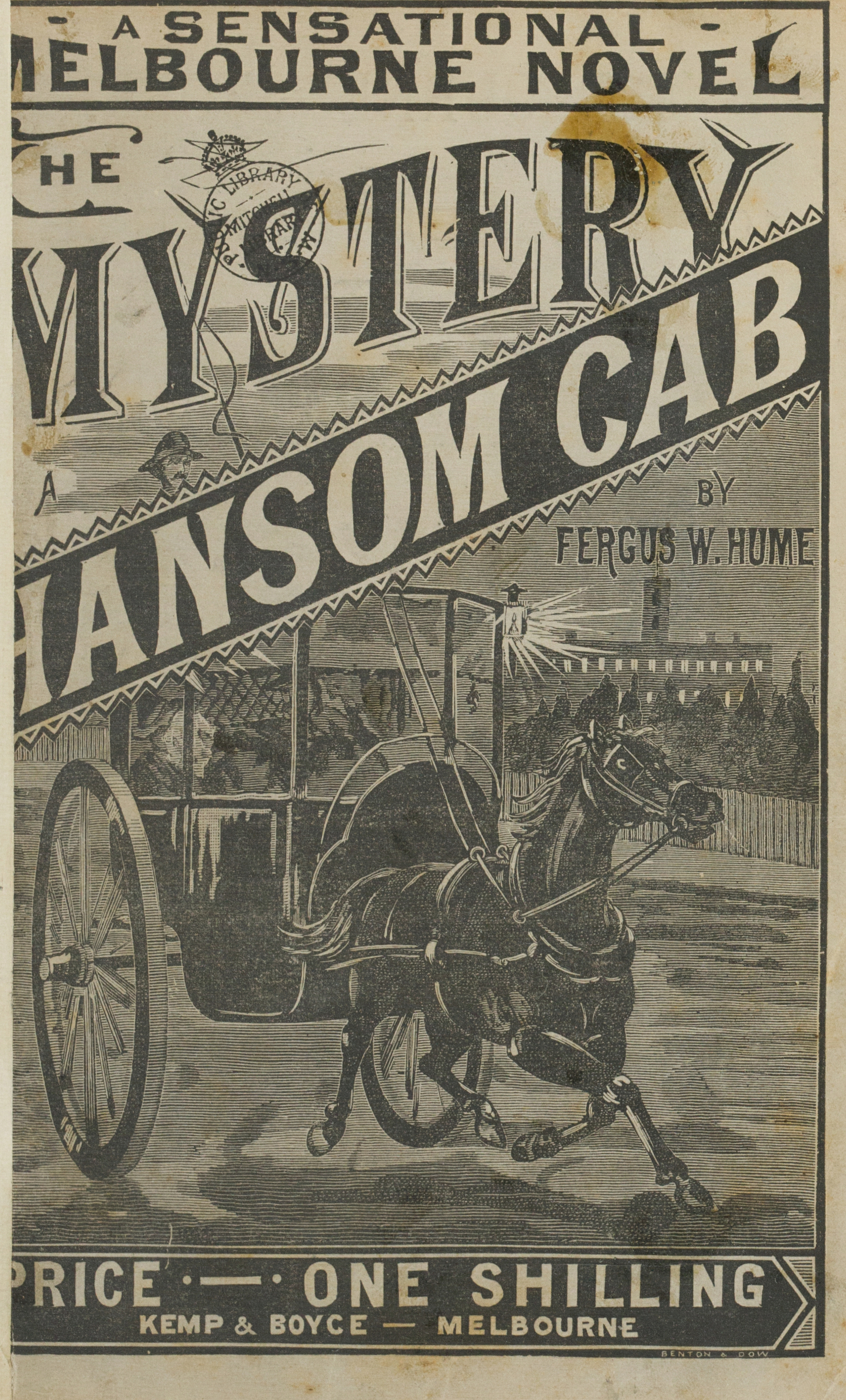
Cover art for 'The mystery of a hansom cab', written by Fergus W. Hume

The evolution of locked-room mysteries was one of the landmarks in the history of crime fiction. The Sherlock Holmes mysteries of Doyle's are said to have been singularly responsible for the huge popularity of this genre. A precursor was Paul Féval, whose series Les Habits Noirs (1862–67) features Scotland Yard detectives and criminal conspiracies. The best-selling crime novel of the 19th century was Fergus Hume's The Mystery of a Hansom Cab (1886), set in Melbourne, Australia.

The evolution of the print mass media in the United Kingdom and the United States in the latter half of the 19th century was crucial in popularising crime fiction and related genres. Literary 'variety' magazines, such as Strand, McClure's, and Harper's, quickly became central to the overall structure and function of popular fiction in society, providing a mass-produced medium that offered cheap, illustrated publications that were essentially disposable.

Like the works of many other important fiction writers of his day—e.g. Wilkie Collins and Charles Dickens—Arthur Conan Doyle's Sherlock Holmes stories first appeared in serial form in the monthly Strand in the United Kingdom. The series quickly attracted a wide and passionate following on both sides of the Atlantic, and when Doyle killed off Holmes in "The Final Problem", the public outcry was so great, and the publishing offers for more stories so attractive, that he was reluctantly forced to resurrect him.

In Italy, early translations of English and American stories and local works were published in cheap yellow covers, thus the genre was baptized with the term libri gialli or yellow books. The genre was outlawed by the Fascists during WWII, but exploded in popularity after the war, especially influenced by the American hard-boiled school of crime fiction. A group of mainstream Italian writers emerged, who used the detective format to create an antidetective or postmodern novel in which the detectives are imperfect, the crimes are usually unsolved, and clues are left for the reader to decipher. Famous writers include Leonardo Sciascia, Umberto Eco, and Carlo Emilio Gadda.

In Spain, The Nail and Other Tales of Mystery and Crime was published by Pedro Antonio de Alarcón in 1853. Crime fiction in Spain (also curtailed in Francoist Spain) took on some special characteristics that reflected the culture of the country. The Spanish writers emphasized the corruption and ineptitude of the police, and depicted the authorities and the wealthy in very negative terms.

In China, crime fiction is a major literary tradition, with works dating to the Song, Ming and Qing dynasties. Modern Chinese crime fiction emerged from the 1890s, and was also influenced by translations of foreign works. Cheng Xiaoqing, considered the "Grand Master" of 20th-century Chinese detective fiction, translated Sherlock Holmes into classical and vernacular Chinese. In the late 1910s, Cheng began writing his own detective fiction series, Sherlock in Shanghai, mimicking Conan Doyle's style, but relating better to a Chinese audience. During the Mao era, crime fiction was suppressed and mainly Soviet-styled and anticapitalist. In the post-Mao era, crime fiction in China focused on corruption and harsh living conditions during the Mao era (such as the Cultural Revolution).

=== Golden Age ===
The Golden Age, which spanned from the 1920s to 1954, was a period of time featuring the creation of renowned works by several authors. Many of these authors were British. Agatha Christie wrote The Murder of Roger Ackroyd (1926) and The Murder at the Vicarage (1930). These novels commonly prioritized the allure of exploring mysteries in the plot over in-depth character development. Dorothy L. Sayers contributed the Wimsey novels. Her work focused on the spectacle of crime deduction. She also displayed an exaggerated form of aristocratic society, straying from a more realistic story. Other novelists tapped into this setting, such as Margery Allingham and Ngaio Marsh; Allingham, Christie, Marsh and Sayers are known as the Queens of Crime.

Other British authors are G. K. Chesterton with the Father Brown short stories, and Henry Christopher Bailey.

The Golden Age also had roots in the US. As used by S. S. Van Dine, fictional character Philo Vance also took advantage of an inflated personality and a high-class background in a plethora of novels. In 1929, Father Ronald Knox wrote the 'Detective Story Decalogue,' mentioning some conditions of the era. Early foreshadowing and functioning roles for characters were discussed, as well as other items. Ellery Queen was featured in several novels written by Frederic Dannay and Manfred Lee, serving as both a character and pen name. In such novels, clues may be analyzed by the protagonist in tandem with the viewer, generating the possibility of understanding the narrative before it is revealed in the book.

=== Hard-Boiled Age ===
Past the Golden Age, events such as the Great Depression and the transition between World Wars ushered in a change in American crime fiction. There was a shift into hard-boiled novels and their depictions of realism. Dashiell Hammett and his work, including Red Harvest (1929), offered a more realistic social perspective to crime fiction, referencing events such as the Great Depression. James M. Cain contributed The Postman Always Rings Twice (1934). This novel includes a married woman trying to murder her own husband with the assistance of a potential suitor. This theme extends to another of his works, Double Indemnity (1934). Such elements of both books are references to the Gray and Snyder trial. Raymond Chandler was a significant author who managed to see some works made into films. In 1944, he argued for the genre to be seen critically in his essay "The Simple Art of Murder".

== Psychology ==
Crime fiction provides unique psychological impacts on readers and enables them to become mediated witnesses through identifying with eyewitnesses of a crime. Readers speak of crime fiction as a mode of escapism to cope with other aspects of their lives. Crime fiction provides distraction from readers' personal lives through a strong narrative at a comfortable distance. Forensic crime novels have been referred to as "distraction therapy", proposing that crime fiction can improve mental health and be considered as a form of treatment to prevent depression.

== Categories ==
- Detective fiction is a subgenre of crime fiction and mystery fiction in which an investigator or a detective—either professional, amateur, or retired—investigates a crime, often murder.
- The cozy mystery is a subgenre of detective fiction in which profanity, sex, and violence are downplayed or treated humorously.
- The whodunit, the most common form of detective fiction, features a complex, plot-driven story in which the reader is provided with clues from which the identity of the perpetrator of the crime may be deduced before the solution is revealed at the end of the book.
- The historical whodunit is also a subgenre of historical fiction. The setting of the story and the crime have some historical significance.
- The locked-room mystery is a specialized kind of a whodunit in which the crime is committed under apparently impossible circumstances, such as a locked room, which no intruder could have entered or left.
- The American hardboiled school is distinguished by the unsentimental portrayal of violence and sex; the sleuth usually also confronts danger and engages in violence.
- The police procedural is a story in which the detective is a member of the police, thus the activities of a police force are usually convincingly depicted.
- Forensic crime fiction is similar to the police procedural. The investigator whom the reader follows is usually a medical examiner or pathologist; they must use the forensic evidence left on the body and at the crime scene to catch the killer. This subgenre was first introduced by Patricia Cornwell.
- In a legal thriller, the major characters are lawyers and their employees, and they become involved in proving their cases.
- In spy novels, the major characters are spies, usually working for an intelligence agency.
- The caper story and the criminal novel are stories told from the point of view of the criminals.
- The psychological thriller or psychological suspense, a specific subgenre of the thriller, also incorporates elements from detective fiction, as the protagonist must solve the mystery of the psychological conflict presented in these stories.
- The parody or spoof uses humor or sarcasm.
- The crime thriller has the central characters involved in crime, either in its investigation, as the perpetrator, or less commonly, a victim.
- The "nocturnal picaresque" explores the secrets obscured in a city at nighttime.
- The city mystery showcases the investigation of nefarious circumstances within a city.
- The gothic mystery incorporates paranormal activity into the story, including other beings such as ghosts and vampires.
- In the gallows subgenre, the story revolves around the hanging of potential criminals at hand.
- In the criminal confession subgenre, character motives and admittance are discussed.

=== Pseudonymous authors ===
In the history of crime fiction, some authors have been reluctant to publish their novels under their real names. More recently, some publish pseudonymously because of the belief that since the large booksellers are aware of their historical sales figures, and command a certain degree of influence over publishers, the only way to "break out" of their current advance numbers is to publish as someone with no track record.

In the late 1930s and 1940s, British County Court Judge Arthur Alexander Gordon Clark (1900–1958) published a number of detective novels under the alias Cyril Hare, in which he made use of his profoundly extensive knowledge of the English legal system. When he was still young and unknown, award-winning British novelist Julian Barnes (born 1946) published some crime novels under the alias Dan Kavanagh. Other authors take delight in cherishing their alter egos; Ruth Rendell (1930–2015) wrote one sort of crime novels as Ruth Rendell and another type as Barbara Vine; John Dickson Carr also used the pseudonym Carter Dickson. Author Evan Hunter (which itself was a pseudonym) wrote his crime fiction under the name of Ed McBain.

== Tropes ==
As crime fiction has expanded, there have been many common tropes that emerge from this category of fiction. Such occurrences can appear in a variety of subgenres and media.

While the format may vary across different forms of crime fiction, there are many elements that are generally consistent throughout the genre. Many stories often begin when the crime has already occurred. Such fiction also tends to draw from the cultural aspects in which the work originated, whether from recent events or from a general consensus and viewpoints. The use of serial killers and unreliable narrators exists in a decent variety of crime fiction as well.

The plot-puzzle formula, which was frequent in the Golden Age, makes use of potential hints and solutions to drive a story forward in order to unravel mysteries. Likewise, the feature of detectives was popularized by Edgar Allan Poe and Conan Doyle. Hard-boiled detective stories attracted a decent amount of attention to the genre in America and France as well.

Within crime fiction, it can also be common to use dark themes from real life, such as slavery, organized crime, and more. Aside from general themes, referencing instances of crime in real life is also common in several works of crime fiction. These reflections of reality can be expressed in many ways. For instance, crime fiction in Spain expressed grievances with authority, which was opposite to the instances in Japan that credited the government's functionality.

Espionage is another prominent inclusion in many works of crime fiction. It includes the use of political intrigue, morality, and the existence of spies. Prior media used the Cold War for inspiration and provided commentary on such events. Examples include numerous works by John le Carré and Gorky Park (1981), which was written by Martin Cruz Smith.

Inspiration can be drawn from the legal system around the world, with varying degrees of realism. In these cases, a sense of morality and the more dubious parts of society are explored based on the rules that the work provides. Melville Davisson Post's Rudolph Mason: The Strange Schemes (1896) and Harper Lee's To Kill a Mockingbird (1960) are notable examples. Additionally, stories like Double Indemnity (1934) are based on cases from reality.

== Availability ==
=== Classics and bestsellers ===
Only a select few authors have achieved the status of "classics" for their published works. A classic is any text that can be received and accepted universally, because they transcend context. A popular, well-known example is Agatha Christie, whose texts, originally published between 1920 and her death in 1976, are available in UK and US editions in all English-speaking nations. Christie's works, particularly featuring detectives Hercule Poirot or Miss Jane Marple, have given her the title the Queen of Crime, and made her one of the most important and innovative writers in the development of the genre. Her most famous novels include Murder on the Orient Express (1934), Death on the Nile (1937), and the world's best-selling mystery And Then There Were None (1939).

Other less successful, contemporary authors who are still writing have seen reprints of their earlier works, due to current overwhelming popularity of crime fiction texts among audiences. One example is Val McDermid, whose first book appeared as far back as 1987; another is Florida-based author Carl Hiaasen, who has been publishing books since 1981, all of which are readily available.

=== Revivals ===
From time to time, publishing houses decide, for commercial purposes, to revive long-forgotten authors, and reprint one or two of their more commercially successful novels. Apart from Penguin Books, which for this purpose have resorted to their old green cover and dug out some of their vintage authors. Pan started a series in 1999 entitled "Pan Classic Crime", which includes a handful of novels by Eric Ambler, but also American Hillary Waugh's Last Seen Wearing .... In 2000, Edinburgh-based Canongate Books started a series called "Canongate Crime Classics" —both whodunnits and roman noir about amnesia and insanity—and other novels. However, books brought out by smaller publishers such as Canongate Books are usually not stocked by the larger bookshops and overseas booksellers. The British Library has also (since 2012) started republishing "lost" crime classics, with the collection referred to on their website as the "British Library Crime Classics series".

Sometimes, older crime novels are revived by screenwriters and directors rather than publishing houses. In many such cases, publishers then follow suit and release a so-called "film tie-in" edition showing a still from the movie on the front cover and the film credits on the back cover of the book—yet another marketing strategy aimed at those cinemagoers who may want to do both: first read the book and then watch the film (or vice versa). Recent examples include Patricia Highsmith's The Talented Mr. Ripley (originally published in 1955), Ira Levin's Sliver (1991), with the cover photograph depicting a steamy sex scene between Sharon Stone and William Baldwin straight from the 1993 movie, and again, Bret Easton Ellis's American Psycho (1991). Bloomsbury Publishing PLC, though, have launched what they call "Bloomsbury Film Classics"—a series of original novels on which feature films were based. This series includes, for example, Ethel Lina White's novel The Wheel Spins (1936), which Alfred Hitchcock—before he went to Hollywood—turned into a much-loved movie entitled The Lady Vanishes (1938), and Ira Levin's (born 1929) science-fiction thriller The Boys from Brazil (1976), which was filmed in 1978.

Older novels can often be retrieved from the ever-growing Project Gutenberg database.

== See also ==
- The Top 100 Crime Novels of All Time
- Detective fiction
- Murder mystery game
- Mystery fiction
- Mystery film
- List of crime writers
- List of female detective characters
- Art theft
- Crime Writers' Association
- Crime comics
- Crime jazz
- Giallo
- Scandinavian noir
- Western
