= The Man with a Cloak =

1951 film by Fletcher Markle

- Directed by: Fletcher Markle
- Written by: Frank Fenton
- Based on: The Gentleman from Paris; 1950 story in Ellery Queen's Mystery Magazine by John Dickson Carr
- Produced by: Stephen Ames
- Starring: Joseph Cotten; Barbara Stanwyck; Louis Calhern; Leslie Caron
- Cinematography: George J. Folsey
- Edited by: Newell P. Kimlin
- Music by: David Raksin
- Distributed by: MGM
- Release date: November 27, 1951 (New York)
- Running time: 81-84 minutes
- Country: United States
- Language: English
- Budget: $882,000
- Box office: $763,000

The Man with a Cloak is a 1951 American film noir drama film directed by Fletcher Markle and starring Joseph Cotten, Barbara Stanwyck, Louis Calhern and Leslie Caron. The screenplay is based on "The Gentleman from Paris", a short story by John Dickson Carr.

== Plot ==
Young Frenchwoman Madeline Minot arrives in New York in 1848, seeking expatriate Charles Thevenet. She is initially rejected at the door by his mistress and housekeeper Lorna Bounty, but she persists, presenting Charles with a letter of introduction from his only grandson Paul, a romantic revolutionary who Madeline loves.

Charles is an old and wealthy rake who correctly guesses Madeline's purpose in visiting him. She has been sent by Paul to ask him for money to support the revolution in France. Assisted by hulking butler Martin and cook Mrs. Flynn, who also want Charles' fortune, having waited for him to die for ten years, Lorna allows Charles to drink as much as he wants, contrary to the instructions of Dr. Roland, and replaces some prescribed medicine.

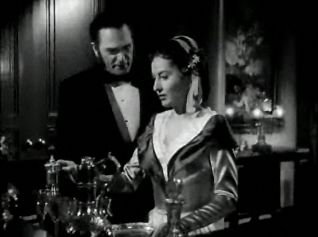
Martin (Joe De Santis) and Lorna (Barbara Stanwyck) consider the changing situation.

Madeline has one ally, a chance acquaintance named Dupin, a heavy-drinking impecunious poet, to whom she turns when she suspects that Charles' medicine has been laced with poison. They take a sample to a pharmacist, who determines that it has no poison in it but that the medicine has been substituted with sugar water. Dupin becomes acquainted with Lorna and recognizes her as a former actress who achieved fame with Charles' backing.

Madeline softens Charles' heart and he summons his lawyer Durand to amend his will. He secretly mixes arsenic into his drink, ready to end his life. However, he suffers a stroke that paralyzes him, leaving him with only partial control of his face. He watches helplessly as Durand drinks the fatal brandy. Charles' pet raven snatches the will and hides it in the fireplace. Before Charles dies, he tries to communicate the location of the will to Dupin solely with his eyes.

Lorna guesses that there is a new will, and after the funeral, she and her accomplices search desperately for it without success. Dupin is more perceptive; from the clues, he finds and retrieves the document, although he must fight Martin to escape the house alive. When the will is read, it reveals that Paul inherits the money, and Lorna, Martin and Mrs. Flynn are left only the house.

Madeline seeks Dupin to thank him. His bartender Flaherty informs her that he has departed, leaving only a seemingly worthless IOU for his sizable bar bill. On one side is a draft of a verse about a woman named Annabel Lee, and on the other, Dupin's real name: Edgar Allan Poe.

== Cast ==
- Joseph Cotten as Dupin, a pseudonym for Edgar Allan Poe
- Barbara Stanwyck as Lorna Bounty
- Louis Calhern as Thevenet
- Leslie Caron as Madeline Minot
- Joe De Santis as Martin
- Jim Backus as Flaherty
- Margaret Wycherly as Mrs. Flynn
- Richard Hale as Durand
- Nicholas Joy as Dr. Roland
- Roy Roberts as Policeman
- Mitchell Lewis as Waiter

== Production ==
Director Fletcher Markle originally wanted Marlene Dietrich for the role of the scheming mistress and Lionel Barrymore for the ailing millionaire. However, Barrymore was too ill and Dietrich declined, with her role awarded to Barbara Stanwyck. During filming, Stanwyck was experiencing a difficult divorce from actor husband Robert Taylor.

Although the film suggests that Poe's name would have been unknown to the other characters in 1848, he was already famous. C. Auguste Dupin appeared in "The Murders in the Rue Morgue" (1841), "The Mystery of Marie Rogêt" (1842) and "The Purloined Letter" (1844), and Poe's poem “The Raven” earned him great popular acclaim when it was published in 1845.

== Music ==
The film's dramatic score was composed and conducted by David Raksin, who wrote for an uncommon ensemble of instruments. He also employed a tone row in the main-title theme, believed to have been the first used in a feature film. The tone row begins E-D-G-A-(Re), and Raksin joked that he had wanted to see whether anyone noticed he had spoiled the hero's identity. Raksin's complete score was issued on CD in 2009 by on Film Score Monthly records.

"Another Yesterday", the song performed onscreen by Barbara Stanwyck, was written by Earl K. Brent and dubbed by vocalist Harriet Lee.

== Reception ==
In a contemporary review for The New York Times, critic A. H. Weiler wrote: "It is obvious from the opening shot of 'The Man With a Cloak' that the producers were endeavoring to fashion a brooding, suspenseful story about a mysterious stranger who was destined for fame. But the newcomer ... is merely leisurely fare no more intriguing than the routine melodrama despite a stellar cast and some stately dialogue. Although the hero's identity is not revealed until the very end, it shouldn't come as too much of a surprise, since our mystery man recites a few snatches of poetry to indicate that his name could be Edgar Allan Poe. And, the prominence of a raven in the cast could be a pretty meaningful clue, too."

According to MGM records, the film earned $441,000 in the U.S. and Canada and $322,000 elsewhere, resulting in a loss of $455,000.
