= Rue Morgue =

Rue Morgue may refer to:

- "The Murders in the Rue Morgue", a short story by Edgar Allan Poe
- Murders in the Rue Morgue (1932 film), a 1932 film based on the story
- Murders in the Rue Morgue (1971 film), a 1971 film
- "Murders in the Rue Morgue", a song from 1981 Iron Maiden album Killers
- The Murders in the Rue Morgue (1986 film)
- Rue Morgue (magazine), a horror magazine
  - Rue Morgue Radio, a radio offshoot of the magazine
  - Rue Morgue Festival of Fear, a Canadian horror convention
