= The Exploits of Chevalier Dupin =

1968 collection of detective short stories by Michael Harrison

The Exploits of the Chevalier Dupin
- First edition
- Author: Michael Harrison
- Cover artist: Ronald Clyne
- Language: English
- Genre: Detective fiction
- Publisher: Mycroft & Moran
- Publication date: 1968
- Publication place: United States
- Media type: Print (hardback)
- Pages: xi, 138 pp

The Exploits of the Chevalier Dupin is a collection of detective short stories by author Michael Harrison. It was released in 1968 by Mycroft & Moran in an edition of 1,917 copies. The stories are pastiches of the C. Auguste Dupin stories of Edgar Allan Poe. The stories were first published in Ellery Queen's Mystery Magazine.

There is an expanded UK edition by a different publisher which adds a further five stories This appeared under the title Murder in the Rue Royale and Further Exploits of the Chevalier Dupin, (UK: Tom Stacey, 1972). Both editions contain the introduction by Ellery Queen, and the non-fiction piece on Dupin by Harrison.

== Contents ==
The Exploits of the Chevalier Dupin contains the following tales:

1. "Introduction", by Ellery Queen
2. "Dupin: The Reality Behind the Fiction"
3. "The Vanished Treasure"
4. "The Mystery of the Fulton Documents"
5. "The Man in the Blue Spectacles"
6. "The Mystery of the Gilded Cheval-Glass"
7. "The Fires in the Rue St. Honoré"
8. "The Murder in the Rue Royale"
9. "The Facts in the Case of the Missing Diplomat"
