= Last Seen Wearing =

Last Seen Wearing may refer to:

- Last Seen Wearing ... (Hillary Waugh novel), a 1952 police procedural by Hillary Waugh
- Last Seen Wearing (Dexter novel), a 1976 Inspector Morse novel by Colin Dexter
