= Morgue Street =

- Directed by: Alberto Viavattene
- Written by: Emiliano Ranzani; Alberto Viavattene
- Based on: The Murders in the Rue Morgue by Edgar Allan Poe
- Produced by: Alberto Viavattene
- Starring: Mario Cellini; Désirée Giorgetti; Roberto Nali; Federica Tommasi
- Cinematography: Emiliano Ranzani
- Edited by: Alberto Viavattene
- Music by: Paolo Testa
- Production company: Goaway Film
- Release date: 2012
- Running time: 11 minutes
- Country: Italy
- Language: English

Morgue Street is a 2012 Italian horror short film directed by Alberto Viavattene and based on Edgar Allan Poe's 1841 short story "The Murders in the Rue Morgue". The film gained notoriety when it was banned in Australia by the Australian Classification Board before it could screen at Sydney's A Night of Horror film festival. It has been praised by Jack Ketchum, Brian Yuzna, and Uwe Boll.
