= Sherlock Holmes in the Great Murder Mystery =

1908 film

- Directed by: Fred J. Balshofer
- Based on: Edgar Allan Poe's short story "The Murders in the Rue Morgue"
- Produced by: Crescent Film Company
- Starring: William Kolle
- Production companies: Crescent Film Company, New York
- Release date: November 27, 1908
- Country: United States
- Language: Silent

Sherlock Holmes in the Great Murder Mystery is a 1908 American silent film produced by the Crescent Film Company of New York, and directed by early film pioneer, Fred J. Balshofer. The film was released on 27 November 1908 and is an adaptation of Edgar Allan Poe's 1841 short story "The Murders in the Rue Morgue", which is considered the first detective story, though the plot was altered to include Arthur Conan Doyle's detective Sherlock Holmes instead of Poe's C. Auguste Dupin.

Holmes was played by veteran stage actor William Kolle, star of the Venetian Gardens Theater at Brooklyn's Prospect Hall. This film featured the first cinematic appearance of Dr. Watson, who was portrayed by an unknown actor.
