= The Mystery of Marie Roget (film) =

1942 film by Phil Rosen

- Directed by: Phil Rosen
- Screenplay by: Michel Jacoby
- Based on: "The Mystery of Marie Rogêt" by Edgar Allan Poe
- Starring: Maria Montez; Patric Knowles; Maria Ouspenskaya; John Litel; Edward Norris; Lloyd Corrigan
- Cinematography: Elwood Bredell
- Edited by: Milton Carruth
- Production company: Universal Pictures Company, Inc.
- Distributed by: Universal Pictures Company, Inc.
- Release date: 3 April 1942
- Running time: 60 minutes
- Country: United States
- Language: English

The Mystery of Marie Roget is a 1942 American horror mystery film starring Patric Knowles. The story was adapted from the short story "The Mystery of Marie Rogêt" written by Edgar Allan Poe in 1842. The film, directed by Phil Rosen and produced by Universal Pictures, is set in 1889.

== Plot ==
In 1889 Paris, musical comedy star Marie Roget has been missing for ten days. Police inspector Gobelin is investigating her disappearance. The French Minister for Naval Affairs, Henri Beauvais, a friend of Marie's grandmother, Madame Cecile Roget, and her younger sister Camille, threatens to take Gobelin off the case. Therefore, Gobelin brings medical officer Dr. Paul Dupin into the case.

The body of a dead woman is found in the river. Although her face is mutilated, Beauvais believes it is Marie. But then Marie returns, but refuses to say where she has been. Camille becomes engaged to Marcel Vigneauz. Marcel and Marie are lovers and planning to murder Camille, who is set to inherit a fortune. Cecile Roget asks Dupin to escort Camille to a party as she fears her granddaughter shall be murdered there. At the party, Beauvais propositions Marie, telling her that he knows of her affair with Marcel. Marcel hesitates to kill Camille, causing an argument between him and Marie.

Marie disappears. The body of another faceless woman is found. Dupin sneaks into the morgue to remove the brain from the second woman's body, and identifies it as Marie. Cecile tells Camille about Marie's plan to kill her. Marcel confesses to killing Marie, but says he did so to save Camille. Beauvais demands the charges against Marcel be dropped and Dupin agrees. Marcel challenges Dupin to a duel. Gobelin learns from Scotland Yard that the first dead body was that of Marcel's English wife, who had recently come to Paris to find her husband.

Dupin and Gobelin discover Beauvais and Marcel have gone missing. Dupin reveals he accused Camille of having Marie's diary, even though he knew the diary didn't exist, so the murderer would retrieve it. They arrive at the Roget home just as Marcel was going to kill Camille. Gobelin shoots Marcel. Gobelin afterwards discovers that Beauvais has been secretly helping Dupin.

== Cast ==
- Patric Knowles as Paul Dupin
- Maria Montez as Marie Roget
- Maria Ouspenskaya as Cecile Roget
- John Litel as Henri Beauvais
- Edward Norris as Marcel Vigneaux
- Lloyd Corrigan as Gobelin
- Nell O'Day as Camille Roget
- Frank Reicher as Magistrate
- Paul E. Burns as Gardener
- Charles Middleton as Zoo Curator
- William Ruhl as Detective
- Reed Hadley as Naval Officer

== Style ==
Despite promotional material stating "Who is the Phantom Mangler of Paris" suggesting a Jack the Ripper type of character, the authors of the book Universal Horrors stated the fim is "another instance of a slick Universal mystery dressed up in eratz "chiller" trappins to attract the horror trade."

== Production ==
The Mystery of Marie Roget is based on Edgar Allan Poe's short story "The Mystery of Marie Rogêt" (1842). Screenwriter Michel Jacoby updated the setting of the original story to 1889 and changed the profession of Marie Roget from a shopgirl to a musical comedy star. It was the first film version of the short story.

The lead female role was to have been played by Peggy Moran who was cast as of December 1941. Two days before filming started on 10 December, Moran was replaced by Maria Montez. In the fim, the song she sings "Mama Dit Moi" is mouthed by Montez but sung by vocalist Dorothy Triden. Nell O'Day spoke negatively about working with Montez, saying that despite getting along with her, Montez "was not popular with the staff and crew because she thought of them almost as servants." Edward Norris spoke positively about working on the film, stating that Pat Knowles and him "had a wonderful time and became longtime friends, very good friends." Norris went on to discuss that on weekends they would often ride motorcycles together and go hunting occasionally with their wives. Production began on December 10, 1941, and ended before the year was over.

The film reuses several music pieces from previous films, including Franz Waxman's music from The Invisible Ray and the waltz music is from the 1941 film Back Street.

== Release ==
The Mystery of Marie Roget was distributed theatrically by the Universal Pictures Company on April 3, 1942. The film was later re-released as Phantom of Paris.

== Reception ==
From contemporary reviews, Bosley Crowther of The New York Times described the film as a "Butchered retelling of [Poe]" and a "dreary, aimless film, devoid of logic or excitement or even a shadows of suspense." Archer Winsten of The New York Post stated that despite a "better than average cast" there "has been no original thought expanded on lines and direction" opining that the film was a "routine quickie." Kate Cameron of The New York Daily News gave the film two and a half stars, finding that "with a little more care spent on the script to clear up the reasons for the second murder and with a tighter hand on the directorial reins to keep the mystery running smoothly and suspensefully though this film, this story of Poe's might have been built into a first class thriller." Similar negative reviews came from William Boehnel in The New York World-Telegram ("[The film] is dull and static and almost entirely lacking in suspense"), Rose Pelswick of The New York Journal-American ("there's little action in the piece, which doesn't contain much mystery, either, since the identity of the murderer is obvious all along.")

From retrospective reviews, the authors of the book Universal Horrors found that the films "galloping pace" and appealing cast help the film over the hurdles and that it was "not a horror film despite Universal's campaign to palm it off as such, and it tips its hand far too soon to cut muster as a solid whodunit. But judged strictly for what it does deliver - 60 minutes of adventuresome sleuthing, favoured with mystery and mild horror embellishments - it's a good example Universal's B-unit working at peak efficiency."

== See also ==
- List of Universal Pictures films (1940–1949)
