= C. Auguste Dupin =

Fictional French crime-solver created by Edgar Allan Poe

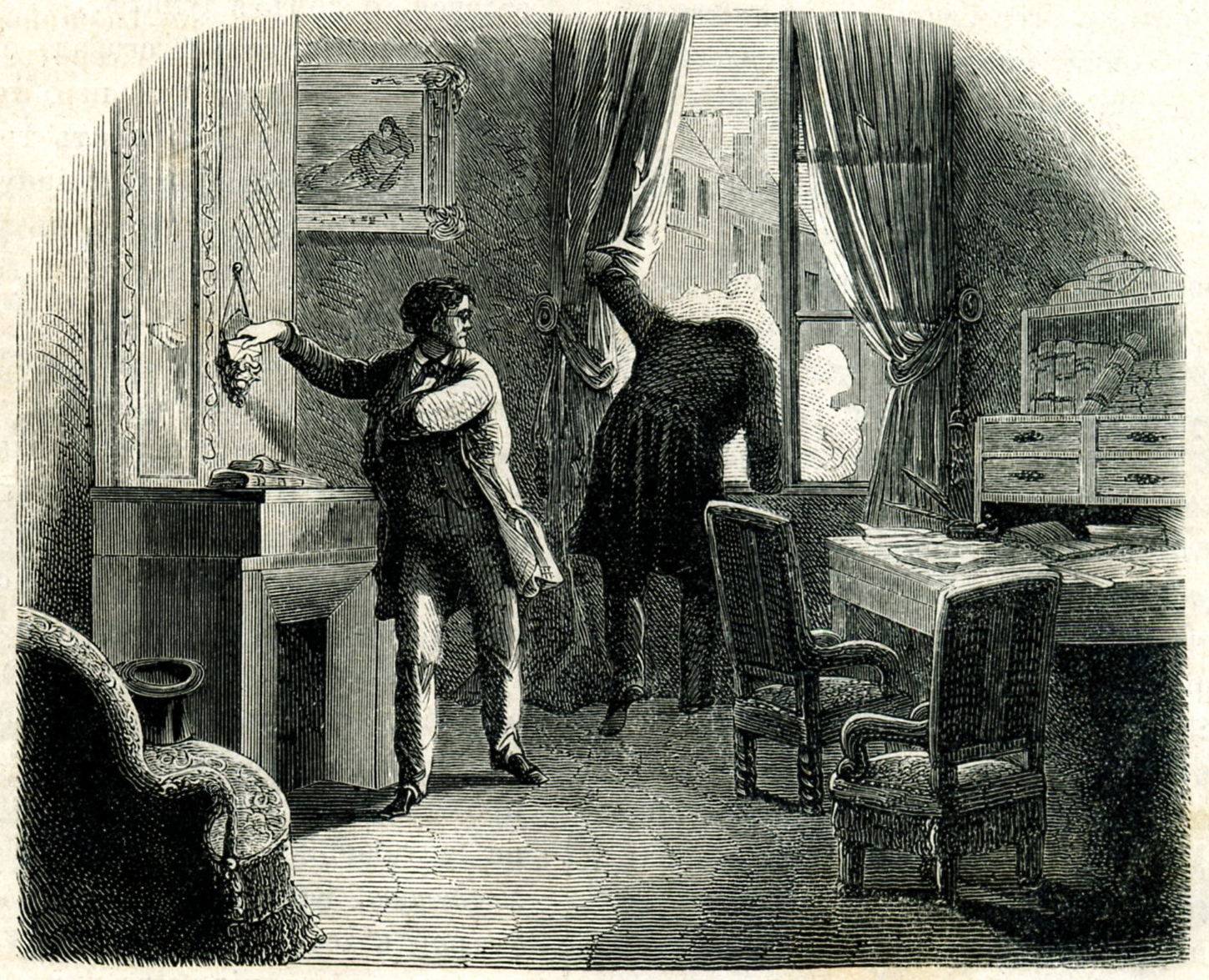
- Auguste Dupin in "The Purloined Letter" (1864 illustration by Frédéric-Théodore Lix)
- First appearance: "The Murders in the Rue Morgue"
- Last appearance: "The Purloined Letter"
- Created by: Edgar Allan Poe

In-universe information
- Gender: Male
- Occupation: Detective (hobbyist)
- Nationality: French

Le Chevalier C. Auguste Dupin (French: [oɡyst dypɛ̃]) is a fictional character created by Edgar Allan Poe. Dupin made his first appearance in Poe's 1841 short story "The Murders in the Rue Morgue", widely considered the first detective fiction story. He reappears in "The Mystery of Marie Rogêt" (1842) and "The Purloined Letter" (1844).

Dupin is not a professional detective and his motivations for solving the mysteries change throughout the three stories. Using what Poe termed "ratiocination", Dupin combines his considerable intellect with creative imagination, even putting himself in the mind of the criminal. His talents are strong enough that he appears able to read the mind of his companion, the unnamed narrator of all three stories.

Poe created the Dupin character before the word detective had been used for a profession. The character laid the groundwork for fictional detectives to come, including Sherlock Holmes, Hercule Poirot and many others. Through Dupin, Poe also established many of the common elements of the detective fiction genre.

== Character background and analysis ==
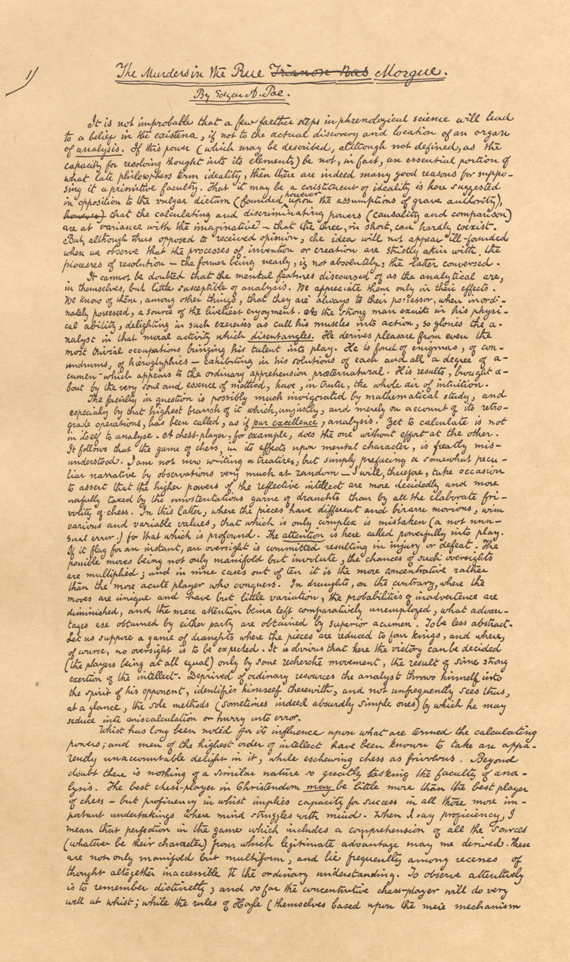
Facsimile of Poe's original manuscript for "The Murders in the Rue Morgue", the first appearance of C. Auguste Dupin

Dupin is from what was once a wealthy family, but "by a variety of untoward events" has been reduced to more humble circumstances, and contents himself only with the basic necessities of life. He now lives in Paris with his close friend, the anonymous narrator of the stories. The two met by accident while both were searching for "the same rare and very remarkable volume" in an obscure library. This scene, the two characters searching for a hidden text, serves as a metaphor for detection. They promptly move to an old manor located in Faubourg Saint-Germain. For hobbies, Dupin is "fond" of enigmas, conundrums, and hieroglyphics. He bears the title Chevalier, meaning that he is a knight in the Légion d'honneur. Dupin shares some features with the later gentleman detective, a character type that became common in the Golden Age of Detective Fiction. He is acquainted with police prefect "G.", who appears in all three stories seeking his counsel.

In "The Murders in the Rue Morgue", Dupin investigates the murder of a mother and daughter in Paris. He investigates another murder in "The Mystery of Marie Rogêt". This story was based on the true story of Mary Rogers, a saleswoman at a cigar store in Manhattan whose body was found floating in the Hudson River in 1841. Dupin's final appearance, in "The Purloined Letter", features an investigation of a letter stolen from the French queen. Poe called this story "perhaps, the best of my tales of ratiocination". Throughout the three stories, Dupin travels through three distinct settings. In "The Murders in the Rue Morgue", he travels through city streets; in "The Mystery of Marie Rogêt", he is in the wide outdoors; in "The Purloined Letter", he is in an enclosed private space.

Dupin is not actually a professional detective, and his motivations change through his appearances. In "The Murders in the Rue Morgue", he investigates the murders for his personal amusement, and to prove the innocence of a falsely accused man. He refuses a financial reward. However, in "The Purloined Letter", Dupin purposefully pursues a financial reward.

== Dupin's method ==
But it is in matters beyond the limits of mere rule that the skill of the analyst is evinced. He makes in silence a host of observations and inferences....

— Edgar Allan Poe, "The Murders in the Rue Morgue"

While discussing Dupin's method in the light of Charles Sanders Peirce's logic of making good guesses or abductive reasoning, Nancy Harrowitz first quotes Poe's definition of analysis and then shows how "Poe the semiotician is running the gamut of possibilities here—inferences, reasoning backwards, visual, sensual and aural signs, reading faces. Playing cards with the man would have been an interesting experience."

There is considerable controversy about the philosophical nature of Dupin's method. According to biographer Joseph Krutch, Dupin is portrayed as a dehumanized thinking machine, a man whose sole interest is in pure logic. However, Krutch has been accused elsewhere of a "lazy reading" of Poe. According to Krutch, Dupin's deductive prowess is first exhibited when he appears to read the narrator's mind by rationally tracing his train of thought for the previous fifteen minutes. He employs what he terms "ratiocination". Dupin's method is to identify with the criminal and put himself in his mind. By knowing everything that the criminal knows, he can solve any crime. His attitude towards life seems to portray him as a snob who feels that due to his aptitude, normal human interaction and relationships are beneath him. In his method, he combines his scientific logic with artistic imagination. As an observer, he pays special attention to what is unintended, such as hesitation, eagerness, or a casual or inadvertent word.

Dupin's method also emphasizes the importance of reading and writing: many of his clues come from newspapers or written reports from the Prefect. This device also engages the readers, who follow along by reading the clues themselves.

== Inspiration ==
Poe may have derived the name "Dupin" from a character in a series of stories first published Burton's Gentleman's Magazine in 1828 called "Unpublished passages in the Life of Vidocq, the French Minister of Police". The name also implies "duping" or deception, a skill Dupin shows off in "The Purloined Letter." Detective fiction, however, had few precedents and the word detective had not yet been coined when Poe first introduced Dupin. The closest example in fiction is Voltaire's Zadig (1748), in which the main character performs similar feats of analysis, themselves borrowed from The Three Princes of Serendip, an Italian rendition of a famous poem called Hasht Bihisht written by the Persian poet Amir Khusrau, which itself is based on the Haft Paykar by Nizami Ganjavi, written around 1197 AD, which in turn takes its outline from the earlier epic Shahnameh written by the Persian poet Firdausi around 1010 AD.

It is often interpreted that Poe borrowed the name from André Marie Jean Jacques Dupin. The first Dupin story coincided in Graham's Magazine with Poe's review of a translation of Louis de Loménie's biographical sketches. Both André Dupin and his brilliant brother Charles are profiled by Loménie. It has also been argued that Poe adapted the autobiographical persona of Thomas De Quincey's "The Opium-Eater" into Dupin.

In writing the series of Dupin tales, Poe capitalized on contemporary popular interest. His use of an orangutan in "The Murders in the Rue Morgue" was inspired by the popular reaction to an orangutan that had been on display at the Masonic Hall in Philadelphia in July 1839. In "The Mystery of Marie Rogêt", he used a true story that had become of national interest.

It is sometimes speculated that Poe conceived the idea of Dupin from his investigation of the authenticity of an automaton called The Mechanical Turk, which he published in his essay "Mälzel's Chess Player".

== Literary influence and significance ==
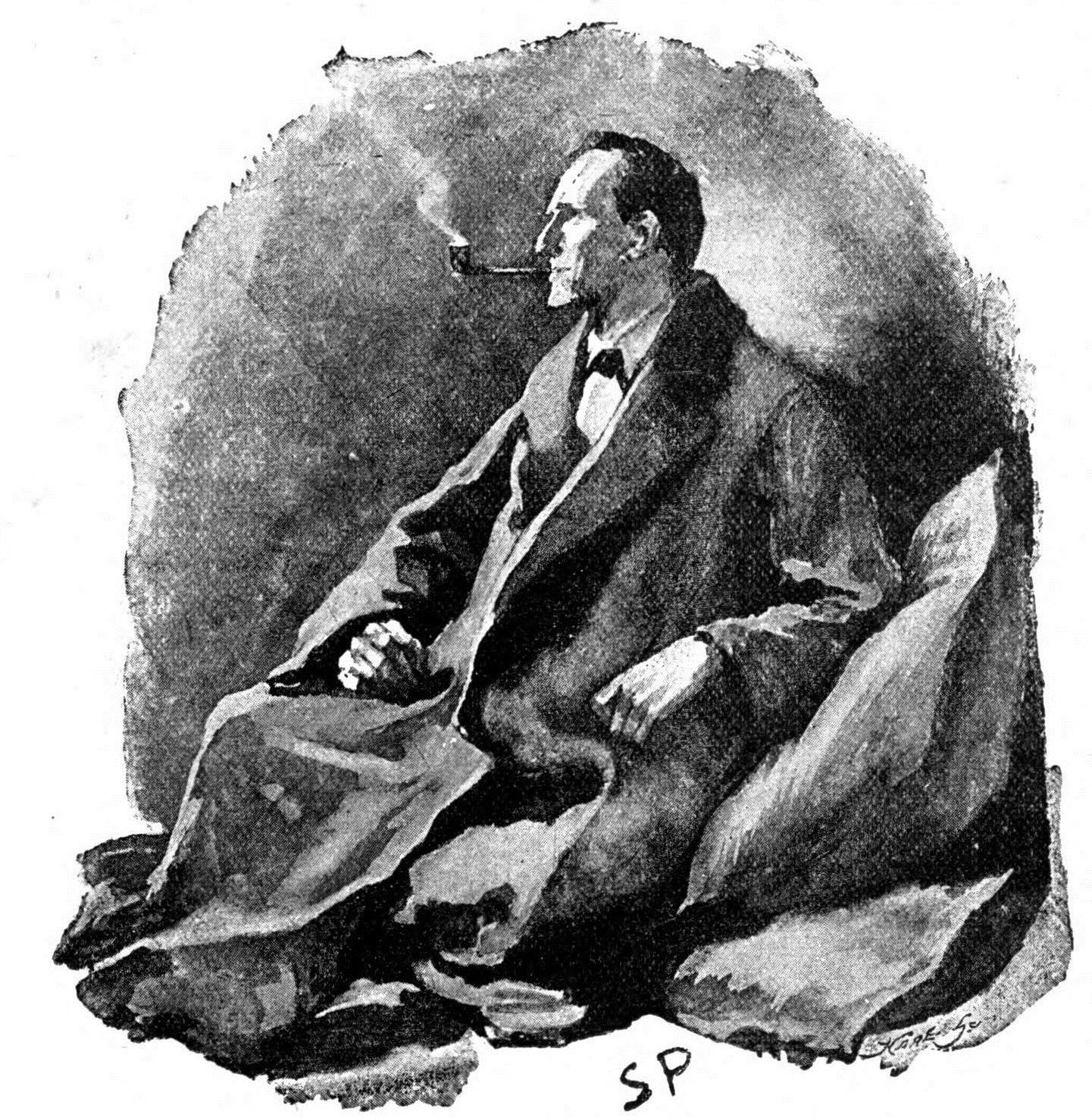
Sherlock Holmes was one of several fictional detectives influenced by Dupin.

C. Auguste Dupin is generally acknowledged as the first detective in fiction. The character served as the prototype for many that were created later, including Sherlock Holmes by Arthur Conan Doyle and Hercule Poirot by Agatha Christie. Conan Doyle once wrote, "Each [of Poe's detective stories] is a root from which a whole literature has developed... Where was the detective story until Poe breathed the breath of life into it?"

Many tropes that would later become commonplace in detective fiction first appeared in Poe's stories: the eccentric but brilliant detective, the bumbling constabulary, the first-person narration by a close personal friend. Dupin also initiates the storytelling device where the detective announces his solution and then explains the reasoning leading up to it. Like Sherlock Holmes, Dupin uses his considerable deductive prowess and observation to solve crimes. Poe also portrays the police in an unsympathetic manner as a sort of foil to the detective.

The character helped establish the genre of detective fiction, distinct from mystery fiction, with an emphasis on the analysis and not trial-and-error. Brander Matthews wrote: "The true detective story as Poe conceived it is not in the mystery itself, but rather in the successive steps whereby the analytic observer is enabled to solve the problem that might be dismissed as beyond human elucidation." In fact, in the three stories which star Dupin, Poe created three types of detective fiction which established a model for all future stories: the physical type ("The Murders in the Rue Morgue"), the mental ("The Mystery of Marie Rogêt"), and a balanced version of both ("The Purloined Letter").

Fyodor Dostoevsky called Poe "an enormously talented writer" and favorably reviewed Poe's detective stories. The character Porfiry Petrovich in Dostoevsky's novel Crime and Punishment was influenced by Dupin.

== Other writers ==
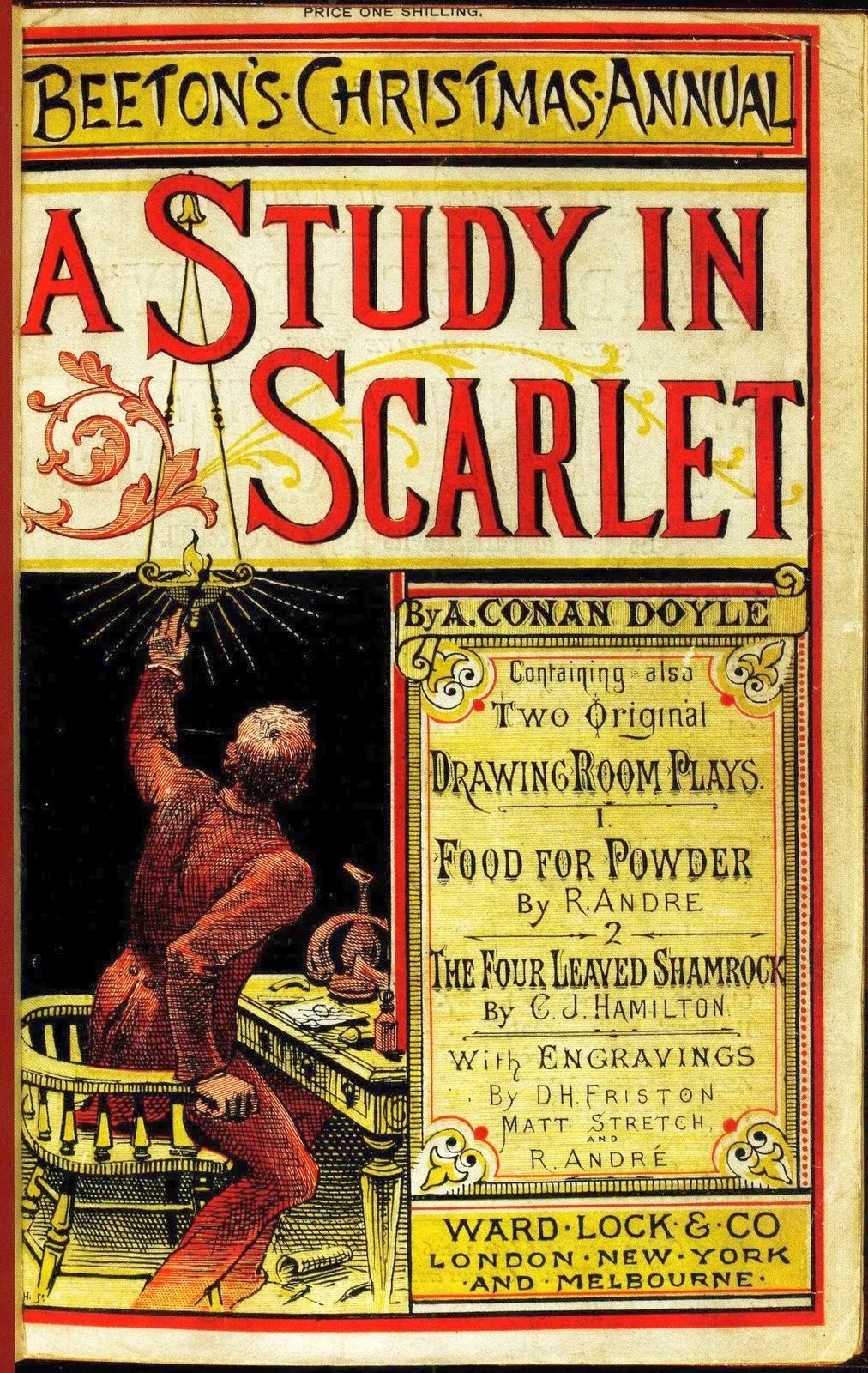
A Study in Scarlet (1887)

- In the first Sherlock Holmes story, A Study in Scarlet (1887), Doctor Watson compares Holmes to Dupin, to which Holmes replies: "No doubt you think you are complimenting me ... In my opinion, Dupin was a very inferior fellow... He had some analytical genius, no doubt; but he was by no means such a phenomenon as Poe appears to imagine." Alluding to an episode in "The Murders in the Rue Morgue", where Dupin deduces what his friend is thinking despite their having walked together in silence for a quarter of an hour, Holmes remarks: "That trick of his breaking in on his friend's thoughts with an apropos remark... is really very showy and superficial"; nevertheless, Holmes later performs the same 'trick' on Watson in "The Adventure of the Cardboard Box".
- Louisa May Alcott parodied Dupin and Poe in her 1865 thriller "V.V., or Plots and Counterplots", which has been credited by literary critic Catherine Ross Nickerson as the second-oldest work of modern detective fiction after only Poe's Dupin stories themselves. A short story published anonymously by Alcott, the tale concerns a Scottish aristocrat who tries to prove that a mysterious woman has killed his fiancée and cousin. The detective on the case, Antoine Dupres, is a parody of Auguste Dupin who is less concerned with solving the crime than he is in setting up a way to reveal the solution with a dramatic flourish.
- In Murder in the Madhouse (1935), the first of Jonathan Latimer's series of screwball crime novels starring detective William Crane, Crane presents himself in the sanitarium as C. Auguste Dupin. The story contains more oblique references in the form of stylistic elements (offstage murders, Crane's theories of deduction) that suggest Poe had an influence on Latimer's writing.
- Jorge Luis Borges pays homage to Poe's Dupin in "Death and the Compass", by calling his main detective character Erik Lönrott an "Auguste Dupin"-type detective. This is one of the stories published by Borges in his Ficciones (1944). Borges also translated Poe's works into Spanish.
- Dupin had considerable impact on the Agatha Christie character Hercule Poirot, first introduced in The Mysterious Affair at Styles (1920). Later in the fictional detective's life, he writes a book on Edgar Allan Poe in the novel Third Girl (1966).
- Dupin next appears in a series of seven short stories in Ellery Queen's Mystery Magazine by Michael Harrison in the 1960s. The stories were collected by the Publishers Mycroft & Moran in 1968 as The Exploits of Chevalier Dupin. The stories include "The Vanished Treasure" (May 1965) and "The Fires in the Rue St. Honoré" (January 1967). This collection was subsequently published in England by Tom Stacey in 1972 as Murder in the Rue Royale and Further Exploits of the Chevalier Dupin and included a further five stories written since the original publication.
- In The Work of Betrayal (1975) by Mario Brelich – Dupin investigates the mysterious case of Judas Iscariot.
- In "The New Murders of the Rue Morgue" (1984), a short story in volume two of Clive Barker's Books of Blood. Set presumably in 1984, the story features Lewis, a descendant of Dupin, who stumbles upon a nearly identical case.
- The Man Who Was Poe, (1991) a juvenile novel by Avi, features Dupin befriending a young boy named Edmund. The two solve mysteries together in Providence, Rhode Island. Dupin is revealed to be Edgar Allan Poe himself.
- Novelist George Egon Hatvary uses Dupin in his novel The Murder of Edgar Allan Poe (1997) as detective and narrator. Dupin travels to America to investigate the circumstances of Poe's mysterious death in 1849. In the novel, Dupin and Poe became friends when Poe stayed in Paris in 1829, and it was Poe who assisted Dupin in the three cases about which Poe wrote. Hatvary writes that Dupin resembles Poe, so much so that several people confuse the two on first sight.
- Dupin makes a guest appearance in the first two issues of Alan Moore's The League of Extraordinary Gentlemen, Volume I (1999) graphic novel series, helping to track down and subdue the monstrous, Hulk-like Mr. Hyde (who is living secretly in Paris after faking the death described in The Strange Case of Dr Jekyll and Mr Hyde and is the actual murderer from Dupin's first short story). He informs the protagonists (Mina Murray from Dracula, Allan Quatermain from King Solomon's Mines and Captain Nemo from Twenty Thousand Leagues Under the Seas) that the murders in the Rue Morgue have started to happen again, one of the first victims being Anna "Nana" Coupeau.
- The Black Throne (2002) by Roger Zelazny & Fred Saberhagen – is a novel about Poe which has an appearance by Dupin.
- Dupin is the hero of Les ogres de Montfaucon by Gérard Dôle (2004), a collection of thirteen detective stories set in the 19th century, the last of which (« Le drame de Reichenbach ») also provides a link with Sherlock Holmes.
- Dupin teams up with the Count of Monte-Cristo to fight Les Habits Noirs in the story The Kind-Hearted Torturer by John Peel published in the anthology Tales of the Shadowmen, Volume 1 (2005).
- The search for the "real Dupin" is at the center of Matthew Pearl's novel The Poe Shadow (2006).
- Dupin makes an appearance, alongside Poe himself, in the novel Edgar Allan Poe on Mars (2007) by Jean-Marc Lofficier & Randy Lofficier.
- Dupin is referenced in The Rook (2008) by Steven James.
- In The Paralogs of Phileas Fogg (2016), author James Downard has Dupin help Fogg and his cohorts resolve some issues during the American leg of their around-the-world adventure.
- C. Auguste Dupin and Edgar Allan Poe are a sleuthing duo in Karen Lee Street's gothic mystery trilogy: Edgar Allan Poe and the London Monster (2016); Edgar Allan Poe and the Jewel of Peru (2018); and Edgar Allan Poe and the Empire of the Dead (2019).
- Dupin teams up with the husband of alleged murderer Delphine LaLaurie to tackle supernatural threats in Jason Martin's 2023 novel, Witches in the Morgue: An Auguste Dupin Investigation. A second book in the series, Auguste Dupin and the Wolves of God, was expected for release in 2024.

== Direct adaptations ==
=== Film ===
- Sherlock Holmes in the Great Murder Mystery (1908). An adaptation of "The Murders in the Rue Morgue", with Sherlock Holmes replacing Dupin.
- The Murders in the Rue Morgue (1914).
- Murders in the Rue Morgue (1932). A loose Universal horror dramatisation starring Bela Lugosi with Leon Ames as Pierre Dupin.
- The Mystery of Marie Roget (1942). Patric Knowles stars as Dr. Paul Dupin.
- Phantom of the Rue Morgue (1954). Starring Steve Forrest as Professor Paul Dupin.
- Murders in the Rue Morgue (1971). A very loose adaptation which does not feature Dupin.
- Morgue Street (2012). An Italian short film based on "The Murders in the Rue Morgue". Dupin does not appear.

=== Television ===
- Suspense: "The Purloined Letter" (1952). An episode of a CBS anthology series. Dupin does not appear.
- Die Galerie der großen Detektive: "Auguste Dupin findet den entwendeten Brief" (1954). An episode of a West German anthology series, adapting "The Purloined Letter". Walter Andreas Schwarz portrays Dupin.
- Detective: "The Murders in the Rue Morgue" (1968). An episode of a BBC anthology series. Edward Woodward portrays Dupin. Here the anonymous narrator from the stories is depicted as Poe himself (played by Charles Kay).
- A.C. Dupin zasahuje (1970). A Czechoslovak TV miniseries starring Ladislav Chudík as Dupin.
- Ficciones: "Doble asesinato en la calle Morgue" (1972). An episode of a Spanish anthology series, adapting "The Murders in the Rue Morgue".
- Le double assassinat de la rue Morgue (1973). A French TV Film starring Daniel Gélin as Dupin.
- Palabras cruzadas: "Doble crimen en la calle Morgue" (1977). An episode of a Spanish anthology series, adapting "The Murders in the Rue Morgue". Pastor Serrador portrays Dupin.
- Novela: "El misterio de María Roget" (1978). An episode of a Spanish anthology series, adapting "The Mystery of Marie Roget".
- Histoires extraordinaires: "La lettre volée" (1981). An episode of a French anthology series, adapting "The Purloined Letter". Pierre Vaneck portrays Dupin.
- The Murders in the Rue Morgue (1986). A CBS TV movie. George C. Scott plays an ageing Dupin. The film presents Dupin as a retired police detective, who lives with his daughter, Claire (Rebecca De Mornay). Dupin becomes involved in the case, after his daughter's fiancé becomes a suspect for the murders. Here the anonymous narrator from the stories is named Phillipe Huron (Val Kilmer).
- Wishbone: "The Pawloined Paper" (1995).
- Racconti neri: "Gli assassini della Rue Morgue" (2006). An episode of an Italian television series, in which actor Giancarlo Giannini reads excerpts from "The Murders in the Rue Morgue".
- Carl Lumbly portrays Charles Auguste Dupin in The Fall of the House of Usher, a Netflix miniseries adapting numerous Poe stories. Malcolm Goodwin plays a younger version of the character. Instead of the 19th century French sleuth of the original stories, Dupin is depicted here as a modern-day American federal prosecutor investigating the Usher family; a former friend of Roderick Usher, the series is told from the perspective of a conversation between Dupin and Roderick following the death of the latter's bloodline. Elements from "The Murders in the Rue Morgue" were incorporated into the third episode "Murder in the Rue Morgue".

=== Radio ===
- "The Murders in the Rue Morgue" was adapted for The Weird Circle, airing January 2, 1944.
- In 1948, NBC University Theater aired an adaptation of "The Purloined Letter" starring Adolphe Menjou as Dupin. The anonymous narrator was presented as Poe himself (voiced by John Newland).
- The long running CBS anthology series Suspense broadcast "The Mystery of Marie Roget" on 14 December 1953. Cornel Wilde voiced Dupin.
- On January 7, 1975, an adaptation of "Murders in the Rue Morgue" was aired on CBS Radio Mystery Theater.
- "Murders in the Rue Morgue" was dramatised in September 2000 for BBC Radio 4's Classic Serial strand, with Malcolm Tierney voicing Dupin, and his companion (named Roget) voiced by Mark Bonnar.
- In 2011, "The Murders in the Rue Morgue" was adapted as the debut episode of the BBC Radio detective anthology series The Rivals, starring James Fleet as the Sherlock Holmes supporting character Inspector Lestrade. Andrew Scott portrayed Dupin.

== Other media depictions ==
Dupin, as he appeared in volume 10 of Detective Conan

Dupin (played by Joseph Cotten) is a character in the 1951 Fletcher Markle film The Man with a Cloak. Dupin's true identity is revealed at the end of the film to be Poe himself.

In 1966, Ernest Dudley penned an original Dupin story The Flies of Isis for the BBC Light Programme's Midweek Theatre. Rolf Lefebvre voiced Dupin.

In 1988 BBC Radio broadcast two plays about featuring Dupin and Poe. The Real Mystery of Marie Roget features Dupin (Terry Molloy) visiting Poe (Ed Bishop) during his final night of life, to discuss the Mary Rogers murder. The Strange Case of Edgar Allan Poe depicts Dupin (John Moffatt) investigating the death of Poe (Kerry Shale).

In May 2004, Dupin appeared on stage in Murder by Poe, an Off-Broadway production dramatizing a series of Poe stories, including The Murders in the Rue Morgue. Dupin was played by Spencer Aste.

In the comic series Batman Confidential, the creation of Batman's crime-solving super-computer which is linked to Interpol, FBI, and CIA databases is introduced. Commonly known as the "Bat Computer," it is originally nicknamed "Dupin," after Batman's "hero."

In children's book The Vile Village, Count Olaf disguises himself as "Detective Dupin" in order to falsely accuse the protagonists of murder.

In the comic series The League of Extraordinary Gentlemen, an aged Dupin appears as a minor character; we first meet him shortly after Mina Murray and Allan Quatermain arrive in Paris, France in late June 1898.

=== Literary pastiches ===
Michael Harrison wrote a series of Dupin mysteries, collected in 1968 as The Exploits of Chevalier Dupin.

Nine new stories were collected in 2013 as Beyond Rue Morgue: Further Tales of Edgar Allan Poe's First Detective:

- "The Sons of Tammany" by Mike Carey
- "The Unfathomed Darkness" by Simon Clark
- "The Weight of a Dead Man" by Weston Ochse & Yvonne Navarro
- "The Vanishing Assassin" by Jonathan Maberry
- "The Gruesome Affair of the Electric Blue Lightning" by Joe R. Lansdale
- "From Darkness, Emerged, Returned" by Elizabeth Massie
- "After the End" by Lisa Tuttle
- "The Purloined Face" by Stephen Volk
- "New Murders in the Rue Morgue" by Clive Barker
