= Michael Harrison (writer) =

English writer

- Born: 25 April 1907; Milton, Kent, England
- Died: 13 September 1991 (aged 84); Hove, Sussex, England
- Occupation: writer
- Writing career
- Pen name: Quentin Downes
- Genres: Detective fiction, Fantasy fiction, Science fiction

Michael Harrison (25 April 1907 – 13 September 1991) was the pen name of the English detective fiction and fantasy writer Maurice Desmond Rohan.

== Biography ==
Michael Harrison was born in Milton, Kent, England, on 25 April 1907. He attended the University of London and served briefly in the British Military Intelligence during World War II. He married Marie-Yvonne Aubertin.

=== Career ===
Harrison published seventeen novels between 1934 and 1954, when he turned to writing detective fiction. He wrote pastiches of Conan Doyle's Sherlock Holmes and Poe's C. Auguste Dupin and was a noted Sherlock Holmes scholar. His most successful work, In the Footsteps of Sherlock Holmes, was published in 1958 and was followed by The London of Sherlock Holmes and The World of Sherlock Holmes.

Harrison was awarded the Occident Prize for Weep for Lycidas (1934), was named Duke of Sant Estrella by the Kingdom of Redonda (1951), and was named Irregular Shilling by The Baker Street Irregulars of New York (1964). He was a member of the Society of Authors, Crime Writers' Association, Baker Street Irregulars of New York, and the Sherlock Holmes Society of London.
