= The Murders in the Rue Morgue (1986 film) =

1986 television film

- VHS cover art
- Genre: Mystery
- Based on: "The Murders in the Rue Morgue" by Edgar Allan Poe
- Written by: David Epstein
- Directed by: Jeannot Szwarc
- Starring: George C. Scott; Rebecca De Mornay; Val Kilmer; Ian McShane
- Music by: Charles Gross
- Country of origin: United States
- Original language: English

Production
- Producer: Robert Halmi
- Cinematography: Bruno de Keyzer
- Running time: 100 minutes
- Production companies: Robert Halmi Inc.; International Film Productions

Original release
- Network: CBS
- Release: December 7, 1986

The Murders in the Rue Morgue is a 1986 made-for-television mystery film directed by Jeannot Szwarc. It is based on Edgar Allan Poe's 1841 short story of the same name. The film was shot in Paris and shown on CBS on December 7, 1986.

== Plot ==
The mysterious and grisly murders of a mother and daughter leave police investigators puzzled. Few clues were left behind. The killer could not have fled via the windows as they were nailed shut. Nor was the killer observed leaving by neighbors. It seems the only person with the skills to solve the crime is Auguste Dupin, who has been released from the police department by the new prefect. After much persuasion from his daughter Claire Dupin, whose fiancé Adolphe Le Bon is charged with the crime, Dupin begins to investigate the case on his own, and puts together quite an interesting scenario in solving the crime.

== Cast ==
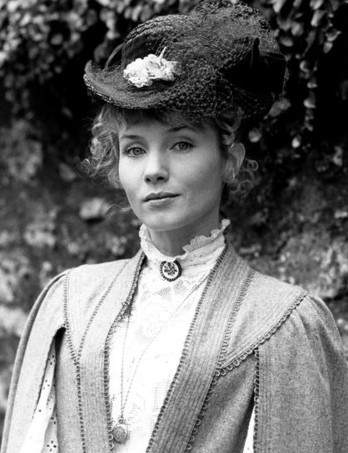
Rebecca De Mornay in Murders in the Rue Morgue (1986)

- George C. Scott as Auguste Dupin
- Rebecca De Mornay as Claire Dupin
- Val Kilmer as Phillipe Huron
- Ian McShane as Prefect of Police
- Neil Dickson as Adolphe Le Bon
- Mak Wilson as Ape
- Sebastian Roché as Henri

== Production ==
Murders in the Rue Morgue was shot in Paris. Location shooting included at Notre Dame Cathedral, the Place de l'Opéra and in Buttes-Chaumont, a park that stands in for the Bois de Boulogne of 1899. About 30% of the film was shot away from the city, such as the prison sequences which were shot in Corbeil, Marne.

== Release ==
Murders in the Rue Morgue was first shown on December 7, 1986 in the United States on CBS at 8pm.

== Reception ==
From contemporary reviews, John J. O'Connor gave the film a positive review finding Scott "persuasive" despite "At times, [George C. Scott] seems to underplay the part but personallity will out, and it does." O'Connor went on to praise "The wonderful period setting and costumes of Paris" while David Epstein's script "sometimes seems to move a bit slowly, but unerringly carries the story forward." Lane Crockett of The Times found that the film "so dourly straight-forward that the mystery has no kick. All you get is a period-looking Paris of the 1800s and humdrum performances, that like the metronome, could lull you to sleep." Crockett described director Jeannot Szwarc's direction "does nothing to enlivent the proceedings" finding he was "more prone to capturing the period flavor and less the essence of a mystery." George C. Scott's performance as "something akin to sleep walking." Crockett commented that Val Kilmer "looks sorely out of place with his fresh boyish American looks and minimal acting talent."

Faye B. Zuckerman wrote in the Spokane Chronicle that the film was an "acting triumph for George C. Scott" and his performance and "a story that will keep you guessing until the final moments" combine to keep you engrossed.". Michael H. Price reviewed the home video of the film referring to it as a "unremarkable made-for-television that is helped along by such fine players as George C. Scott, Val Kilmer and Rebecca De Mornay." Price found, compared to the earlier versions, Robert Florey's 1932 version with Bela Lugosi "remains the best."
