= The Mystery of Marie Rogêt =

1842 short story by Edgar Allan Poe

- Short story by Edgar Allan Poe
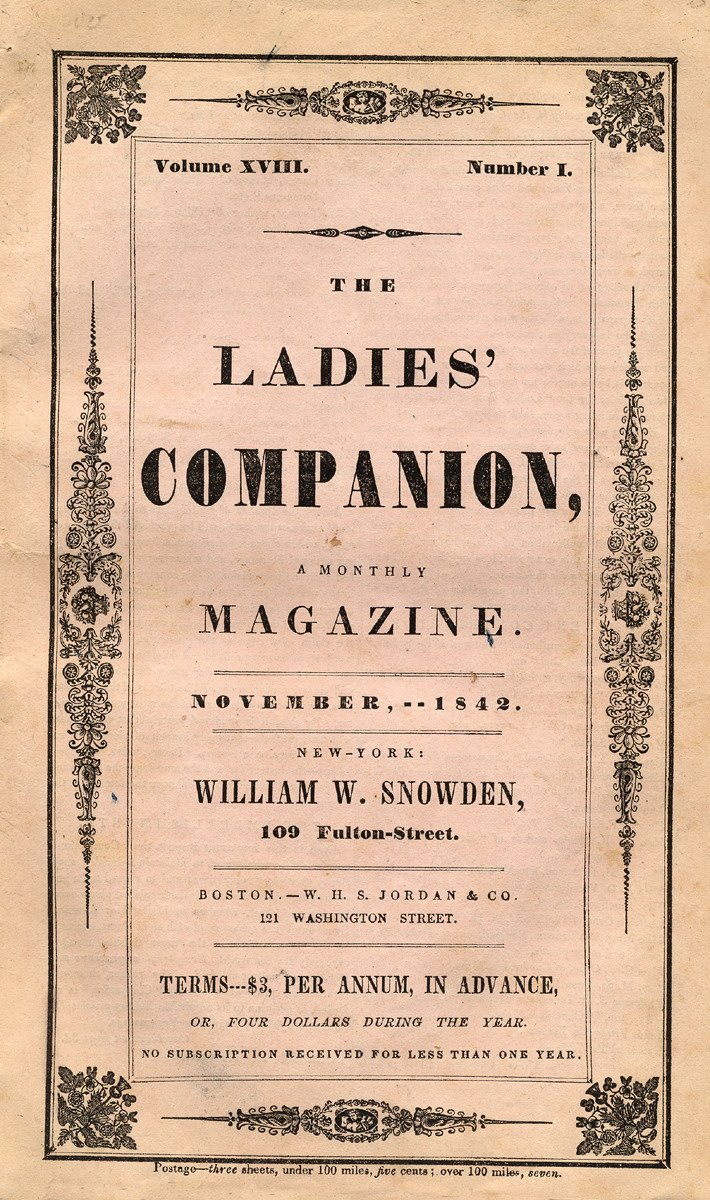
- The Ladies' Companion, November, 1842, Vol. 18, No. 1, New York.

Text available at Wikisource
- Country: United States
- Language: English
- Genres: Detective fiction Short story

Publication
- Publisher: Snowden's Ladies' Companion, William W. Snowden
- Publication date: 1842–1843

"The Mystery of Marie Rogêt", often subtitled A Sequel to "The Murders in the Rue Morgue", is a short story by American writer Edgar Allan Poe written in 1842. This is the first murder mystery based on the details of a real crime. It first appeared in Snowden's Ladies' Companion in three installments, November and December 1842 and February 1843. Poe referred to it as one of his "tales of ratiocination".

== Plot summary ==
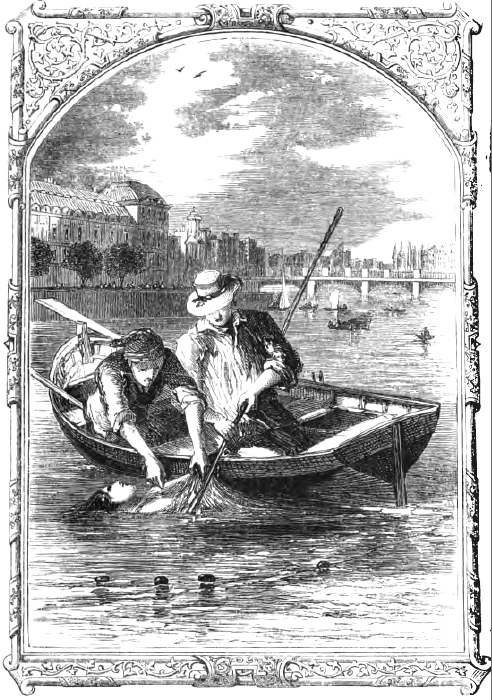
1853 illustration for "The Mystery of Marie Rogêt"

Poe's detective character C. Auguste Dupin and his assistant, the unnamed narrator, undertake the unsolved murder of Marie Rogêt in Paris. The body of Rogêt, a perfume shop employee, is found in the Seine, and the press takes a keen interest in the mystery. In the story, Dupin explains that "it is the object of our newspapers rather to create a sensation—to make a point—than to further the cause of truth", and proceeds by exposing the contradictions in their theories. Even so, he uses the newspaper reports to get into the mind of the murderer.

Dupin rejects the popular theory blaming the murder on a gang of ruffians seen in the area around the time of Rogêt's disappearance. One of such a group, he reasons, would have certainly confessed to the crime due to fear of betrayal rather than a bothered conscience.

Using the known facts in the case, Dupin further determines that a single murderer was involved. This person was probably a sailor, and dragged the victim by the cloth belt around her waist at first, then switched to a cloth around her neck, before dumping the body off a boat into the river. Finding the boat, Dupin suggests, will lead the police to the murderer. An "editor's note" states that it would be inappropriate to relate details of what followed, but that the police did apprehend the true murderer with the help of Dupin's deductions.

== Origins ==
The narrative is based upon the actual murder of Mary Cecilia Rogers. Rogers was presumably born in Lyme, Connecticut, in 1820, though her birth records have not survived. She disappeared on October 4, 1838, in New York City. Working at a tobacco shop, she was regarded as attractive by the male clientele and thus became known as the "Beautiful Cigar Girl". Only a few days later the newspapers announced her return. It was said she had eloped with a naval officer. Three years later, on July 25, 1841, she disappeared again. Her body was found floating in the Hudson River on July 28 in Hoboken, New Jersey. The details surrounding the case suggested she was murdered. The death of this well-known woman received national attention for weeks. Months later, the inquest still ongoing, her fiancé was found dead, an act of suicide. By his side, a remorseful note and an empty bottle of poison were found.

Writing about Rogers as a sequel to "The Murders in the Rue Morgue", Poe tried to solve the aforementioned enigma by creating a murder mystery. As Poe wrote in a letter in 1842: "under the pretense of showing how Dupin ... unravelled the mystery of Marie's assassination, I, in fact, enter into a very rigorous analysis of the real tragedy in New York." He situated the narrative in Paris using the details of the original tragedy. Although there was intense media interest and immortalizing of a sort by Poe, the crime remains one of the most puzzling unsolved murders of New York City.

Fictionalizing actual events, especially murder, was common in this period in American literature. Poe had previously fictionalized the so-called Beauchamp–Sharp Tragedy in his only play, Politian, which was left uncompleted in 1835. The sensational murder story was also fictionalized by several other writers including William Gilmore Simms and Thomas Holley Chivers. "The Mystery of Marie Rogêt", however, was likely the first real-life crime turned into a detective story.

== Publication history ==
Poe presented "The Mystery of Marie Rogêt" by telling editors he had solved the Mary Rogers murder at a time when most readers would know the details of that event. Anxious to get it published, he offered the story to George Roberts of the Boston Notion, writing on June 4, 1842, "For reasons, however, which I need not specify, I am desirous of having this tale printed in Boston." The same day, however, he offered the story to Joseph Evans Snodgrass of the Baltimore Saturday Visiter.

The first part of the serialized story finally appeared in Snowden's Ladies' Companion in November 1842, followed by the second part in December, published in New York by William W. Snowden. An article published in the November 26, 1842, issue of the New York Tribune caused Poe to delay publication of the third installment. The newspaper reported new evidence that suggested that Rogers, the real-life victim, may have died from a botched abortion attempt, referred to as a "premature delivery". He made minor changes in his story to make a similar suggestion. A full reprint of the story in 1845 included 15 small changes to suggest he had known this as a possibility from the start. The story still ends with a recommendation to investigate a possible elopement and the attempt to throw suspicion on a gang.

== Critical response ==
Of Poe's three tales of ratiocination, "The Mystery of Marie Rogêt" is generally considered the least successful. A modern critic wrote:

It might better be called an essay than a story. As an essay, it is an able if tedious exercise in reasoning. As a story, it scarcely exists. It has no life-blood. The characters neither move nor speak.... Only a professional student of analytics or an inveterate devotee of criminology can read it with any degree of unfeigned interest.

Poe's literary rival Rufus Wilmot Griswold, however, voiced a high opinion of the story and considered it an example of Poe's cunning intellect. Charles Baudelaire considered this tale as "a masterpiece, a wonder".

== Adaptations ==
In 1942 Universal Pictures produced the gothic mystery film The Mystery of Marie Roget based on the Poe story. Directed by Phil Rosen, the film starred Patric Knowles, Maria Ouspenskaya and Maria Montez.

On December 14, 1953, the radio drama Suspense aired a dramatization of Edgar Allan Poe's "The Mystery of Marie Roget" in an episode that starred Cornel Wilde. The dramatization was written by E. Jack Neuman.

In 2005, Michael Alderman adapted the short story into a two-act play which was originally produced in 2005 at The River Theater in Astoria, Oregon. The play was produced at The Coaster Theatre Playhouse in Cannon Beach, Oregon in 2025.

== See also ==
- C. Auguste Dupin
- "The Murders in the Rue Morgue"
- "The Purloined Letter"

== Sources ==
- Haycraft, Howard (1941). Murder for Pleasure: The Life and Times of the Detective Story. New York: D. Appleton-Century Company. (1984 reprint: ISBN 978-0-88184-071-1)
- Meyers, Jeffrey (1992). Edgar Allan Poe: His Life and Legacy (Paperback ed.). New York: Cooper Square Press. ISBN 978-0-8154-1038-6.
- Leverenz, David (2001). "Spanking the Master". In Kennedy, J. Gerald (ed.). A Historical Guide to Edgar Allan Poe. New York: Oxford University Press. pp. 95–128. ISBN 978-0-19-512150-6.
- Quinn, Arthur Hobson (1998). Edgar Allan Poe: A Critical Biography. Baltimore: Johns Hopkins University Press. ISBN 978-0-8018-5730-0.
- Rosenheim, Shawn James (1997). The Cryptographic Imagination: Secret Writing from Edgar Poe to the Internet. Baltimore: Johns Hopkins University Press. ISBN 978-0-8018-5332-6.
- Silverman, Kenneth (1991). Edgar A. Poe: Mournful and Never-Ending Remembrance (Paperback ed.). New York: Harper Perennial. ISBN 978-0-06-092331-0.
- Sova, Dawn B. (2001). Edgar Allan Poe A to Z: The Essential Reference to His Life and Work (Paperback ed.). New York: Checkmark Books. ISBN 978-0-8160-4161-9.
- Stashower, Daniel (2006). The Beautiful Cigar Girl. New York: Penguin Books. ISBN 978-0-525-94981-7.
- Thomas, Dwight; Jackson, David K. (1987). The Poe Log: A Documentary Life of Edgar Allan Poe 1809–1849. New York: G. K. Hall & Co. ISBN 978-0-7838-1401-8.
- Walsh, John Evangelist (1968). Poe the Detective: The Curious Circumstances behind 'The Mystery of Marie Roget'. Rutgers University Press. ISBN 978-0-8135-0567-1.
- Whited, Stephen R. (2002). "Kentucky Tragedy". In Flora, Joseph M.; MacKethan, Lucinda Hardwick; Taylor, Todd W. (eds.). The Companion to Southern Literature: Themes, Genres, Places, People. LSU Press. pp. 404–405. ISBN 978-0-8071-2692-9.
- Whitley, John S. (2000). "Introduction". Tales of Mystery and Imagination by Edgar Allan Poe. Wordsworth Editions. pp. vii–xxiii. ISBN 978-1-84022-072-8.
- Baudelaire, Charles (1907). Lettres, 1841–1866. Paris: Société du Mercure de France.
