= Hillary Waugh =

American novelist (1920–2008)

Hillary Baldwin Waugh (June 22, 1920 – December 8, 2008) was a pioneering American mystery novelist. In 1989, he was named a Grand Master by the Mystery Writers of America. Pseudonyms used by Waugh included Elissa Grandower, Harry Walker and H. Baldwin Taylor.

== Career ==
Hillary Baldwin Waugh was born on June 22, 1920, in New Haven, Connecticut. He graduated in 1942 from Yale University, majoring in art with a music minor. He was an editor of campus humor magazine The Yale Record.

During his senior year at Yale, Waugh enlisted in the United States Navy Air Corps and, after graduation, received his aviator's wings. He served in the Panama Canal Zone for two years, flying various types of aircraft.

While in military service, Waugh turned his hand to creative writing, completing and publishing his first novel Madam Will Not Dine Tonight in 1947. He quickly published two more novels, but they were not very well received. In 1949, as the result of reading a case book on true crime, Waugh decided to explore a realistic crime novel. With the cooperation of his fiancée, who was a student at Smith College, Waugh set his police procedural Last Seen Wearing ... in a fictional women's college. Published in 1952, the book was a significant success and is now considered a pioneering effort exploring relentless police work and attention to detail.

After Last Seen Wearing..., Waugh went on to publish more than thirty-five additional detective novels, many aptly described as "hardboiled".

== Personal life and death ==
Waugh married Diana Taylor in 1951 and the couple had three children. They divorced in 1981. Waugh's second marriage, to novelist Shannon O'Cork, also ended in divorce. Waugh died in Torrington, Connecticut, on December 8, 2008.

== Publications ==
=== Series ===
Sheridan Wesley

1. Madam Will Not Dine Tonight (1947)
2. Hope to Die (1948)
3. The Odds Run Out (1949)

Fred Fellows

1. Sleep Long, My Love (1959) filmed as Jigsaw (1962)
2. Road Block (1960)
3. That Night It Rained (1961)
4. Born Victim (1962) dramatised for anthology series Detective
5. The Late Mrs. D. (1962)
6. Death and Circumstance (1963)
7. Prisoner's Plea (1963) dramatised for anthology series Detective
8. The Missing Man (1964)
9. End of a Party (1965)
10. Pure Poison (1966)
11. The Con Game (1968)

Homicide North

1. 30 Manhattan East (1968)
2. The Young Prey (1969)
3. Finish Me Off (1970)

Simon Kaye

1. The Glenna Powers Case (1980)
2. The Billy Cantrell Case (1981)
3. The Doria Rafe Case (1981)
4. The Nerissa Claire Case (1983)
5. The Veronica Dean Case (1984)
6. The Priscilla Copperwaite Case (1986)

=== Other novels ===
- Last Seen Wearing ... (1952)
- A Rag and a Bone (1954)
- The Case of the Missing Gardener (1954)
- Rich Man, Dead Man (1956)
- The Girl Who Cried Wolf (1958)
- The Eighth Mrs. Bluebeard (1958)
- Murder on the Terrace (1961)
- The Duplicate (1964)
- Girl on the Run (1965)
- The Triumvirate (1966)
- The Trouble with Tycoons (1967)
- Run When I Say Go (1969)
- The Shadow Guest (1971)
- Parrish for the Defense (1974)
- A Bride for Hampton House (1975)
- Seaview Manor (1976)
- The Summer at Raven's Roost (1976)
- The Secret Room of Morgate House (1977)
- Madman at My Door (1978)
- Blackbourne Hall (1979)
- Rivergate House (1980)
- Murder on Safari (1987)
- A Death in a Town (1988)
