= Last Seen Wearing ... (Hillary Waugh novel) =

1952 novel by Hillary Waugh

- First edition
- Author: Hillary Waugh
- Language: English
- Genre: Mystery
- Publisher: Doubleday Crime Club
- Publication date: 1952
- Publication place: United States
- Media type: Print (hardcover, paperback)
- Pages: 191

Last Seen Wearing ... is a 1952 detective novel by Hillary Waugh frequently referred to as the police procedural par excellence. Set in a fictional college town in Massachusetts, the book is about a female freshman who goes missing and the painstaking investigation carried out by the police with the aim of finding out what has happened to her.

== Plot ==
The police examine her past for any motive that might make her wish to disappear, or any reason why someone might want to kill her. They find her body after a long and frustrating search. As they sift all the evidence again and again, the identity of her killer slowly begins to emerge, like a photograph taking on recognizable features in the developing fluid.

— Ian Ousby

The novel, which minutely chronicles the work of the police, is told in chronological order. No piece of information is ever held back. At any given point in time, the reader knows just as much as the police. The time narrated is 5½ weeks, from 3 March 1950 to 11 April 1950.

== Sources ==
It is generally accepted that the novel is based on the true case of the December 1, 1946, vanishing of a Bennington College student, 18-year-old Stamford, Connecticut, resident Paula Jean Welden, while hiking the Long Trail in the Green Mountains near Bennington, Vermont. That case has never been solved. It resulted, however, in the creation of Vermont State Police, which did not exist at the time of the disappearance.
