= The Purloined Letter =

- Short story by Edgar Allan Poe
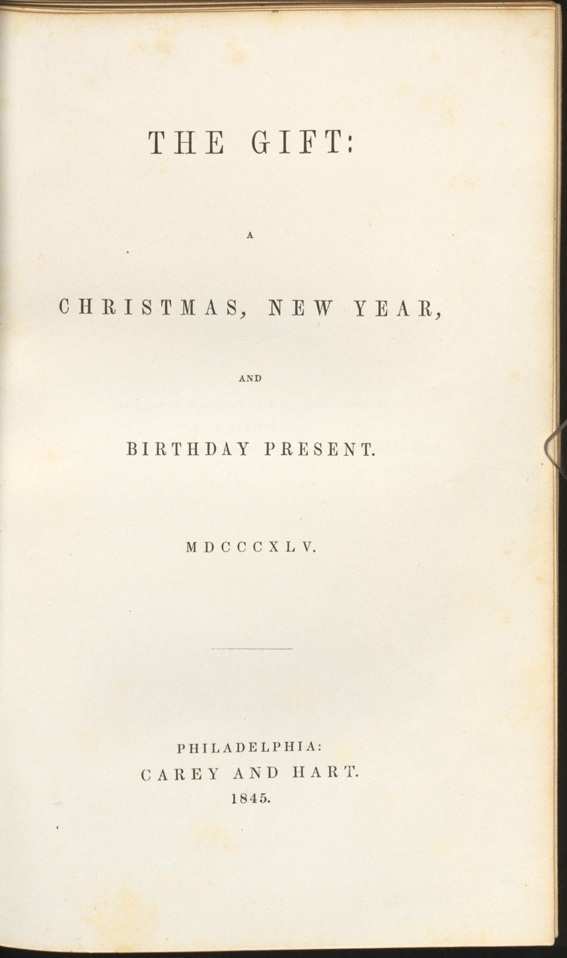
- The Gift: A Christmas, New Year, and Birthday Present, 1845

Text available at Wikisource
- Country: United States
- Language: English
- Genres: Detective fiction Short story

Publication
- Publisher: The Gift for 1845
- Media type: Print (periodical)
- Publication date: December 1844

"The Purloined Letter" is a short story by American author Edgar Allan Poe. It is the third of his three detective stories featuring the fictional C. Auguste Dupin, the other two being "The Murders in the Rue Morgue" and "The Mystery of Marie Rogêt". These stories are considered to be important early forerunners of the modern detective story. It first appeared in the literary annual The Gift for 1845 (1844) and soon was reprinted in numerous journals and newspapers.

== Plot summary ==
The unnamed narrator is with the famous Parisian amateur detective C. Auguste Dupin when they are joined by G—, prefect of the Paris police. G— brings to Dupin's attention the theft from the queen's royal boudoir of a letter addressed to her. The thief is the unscrupulous Minister D—, who switched the letter for one of no importance during a visit with the queen and who has since been using its contents to blackmail her. Dupin agrees with two conclusions formed by G—: that the letter has not yet been made public, since doing so would lead to certain circumstances that have not yet occurred; and that D— must have it close at hand, ready to disclose at a moment's notice.

The police have thoroughly searched D—'s home (referred to as a "hotel" in keeping with Parisian word usage of the era) and person for the letter, including an exhaustive examination of the furniture, walls, and carpeting for any concealed hiding places, but have found nothing. Dupin suggests that G— and his men repeat their search and requests a description of the letter, which G— provides. A month later, the police still have nothing to show for their efforts and a frustrated G— declares that he would pay 50,000 francs to anyone who can help find the letter. Dupin tells G— to write him a check for that amount; once he has done so, Dupin produces the letter from a writing-desk and an overjoyed G— races away to return it to the queen.

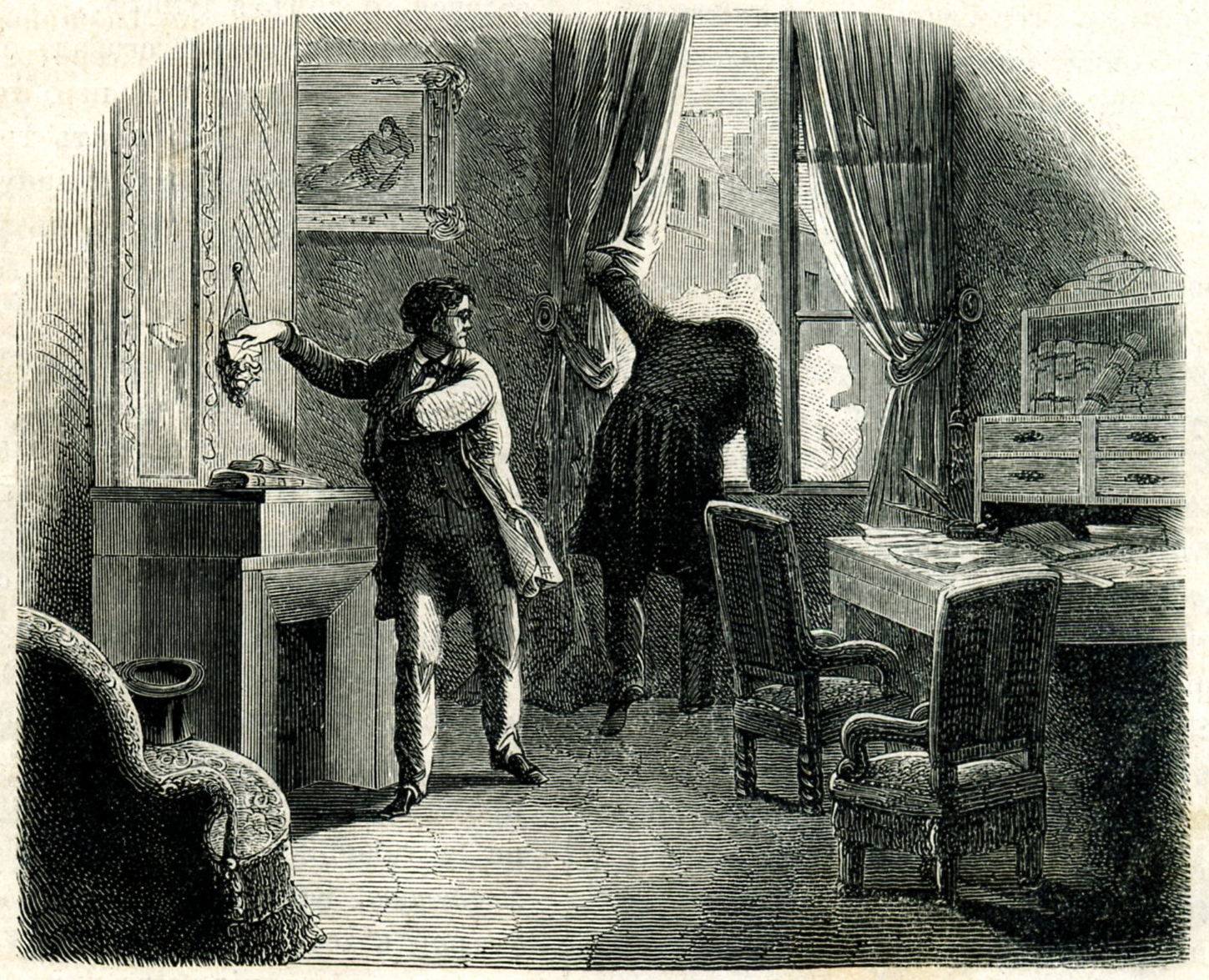
"The letter stolen again" illustration by Frédéric-Théodore Lix, c. 1864

Dupin then explains to the narrator that the police did not take into account the psychology of their adversary in executing their search, drawing a parallel with a schoolboy he once knew who exploited his classmates' methods of thinking in order to win all their marbles at the game of odds and evens. The police had assumed that since the letter was so politically sensitive, D— would take great pains to conceal it; however, Dupin conjectured that it would instead be hidden in plain sight. He contrived to visit D— at his home, disguising his eyes behind green spectacles in order to covertly survey the rooms. Hanging near the mantelpiece was a cheap card-rack with a dirty, half-torn letter in one of its slots. Dupin determined that this was the missing letter, which D— had folded inside-out, re-addressed and sealed, and damaged in order to hide its nature. He left his snuffbox behind upon departing, as an excuse to return the next day. Shortly after this second arrival, a disturbance occurred in the street outside, arranged in advance with a paid confederate. While D— was distracted, Dupin took the letter and replaced it with a duplicate he had prepared.

Dupin chose not to attempt to seize the letter openly for fear that D— would have had him killed. As he both supports the queen politically and bears an old grudge against D—, he hopes that D— will try to use the duplicate in his blackmail scheme and thus bring about his own downfall. Instead of insulting D— by leaving it blank, Dupin had written a quotation from Prosper Jolyot de Crébillon's play Atrée et Thyeste that implies he took the original: Un dessein si funeste, / S'il n'est digne d'Atrée, est digne de Thyeste ("If such a sinister design is not worthy of Atreus, it is worthy of Thyestes").

== Publication history ==
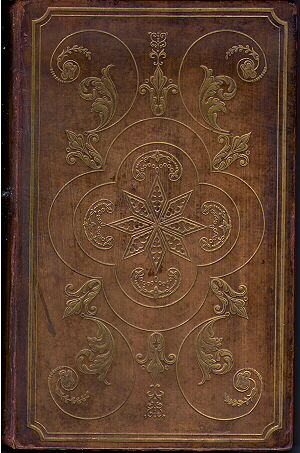
The cover of The Gift, Carey and Hart, Philadelphia, 1845

This story first appeared in The Gift: A Christmas and New Year's Present for 1845, published in December, 1844 in Philadelphia by Carey and Hart, edited by Eliza Leslie. Poe earned $12 for its first printing. It later was included in the 1845 collection Tales by Edgar A. Poe.

== Analysis ==
The epigraph "Nihil sapientiae odiosius acumine nimio" ("Nothing is more hateful to wisdom than excessive cleverness") attributed by Poe to Seneca was not found in Seneca's known work. It is from Petrarch's treatise De remediis utriusque fortunae. Poe probably took the reference from Samuel Warren's novel Ten Thousand a-Year.

Dupin is not a professional detective. In "The Murders in the Rue Morgue", Dupin takes the case for amusement and refuses a financial reward. In "The Purloined Letter", however, Dupin undertakes the case for financial gain and personal revenge. He is not motivated by pursuing truth, emphasized by the lack of information about the contents of the purloined letter. Dupin's innovative method to solve the mystery is by trying to identify with the criminal. The minister and Dupin have equally matched minds, combining skills of mathematician and poet, and their battle of wits is threatened to end in stalemate. Dupin wins because of his moral strength: the minister is "unprincipled", a blackmailer who obtains power by exploiting the weakness of others.

"The Purloined Letter" completes Dupin's tour of different settings. In "The Murders in the Rue Morgue," he travels through city streets; in "The Mystery of Marie Rogêt", he is in the wide outdoors; in "The Purloined Letter", he is in an enclosed private space. French linguist Jean-Claude Milner suggests Dupin and D— are brothers, based on the final reference to Atreus and his twin brother Thyestes.

== Literary significance and criticism ==
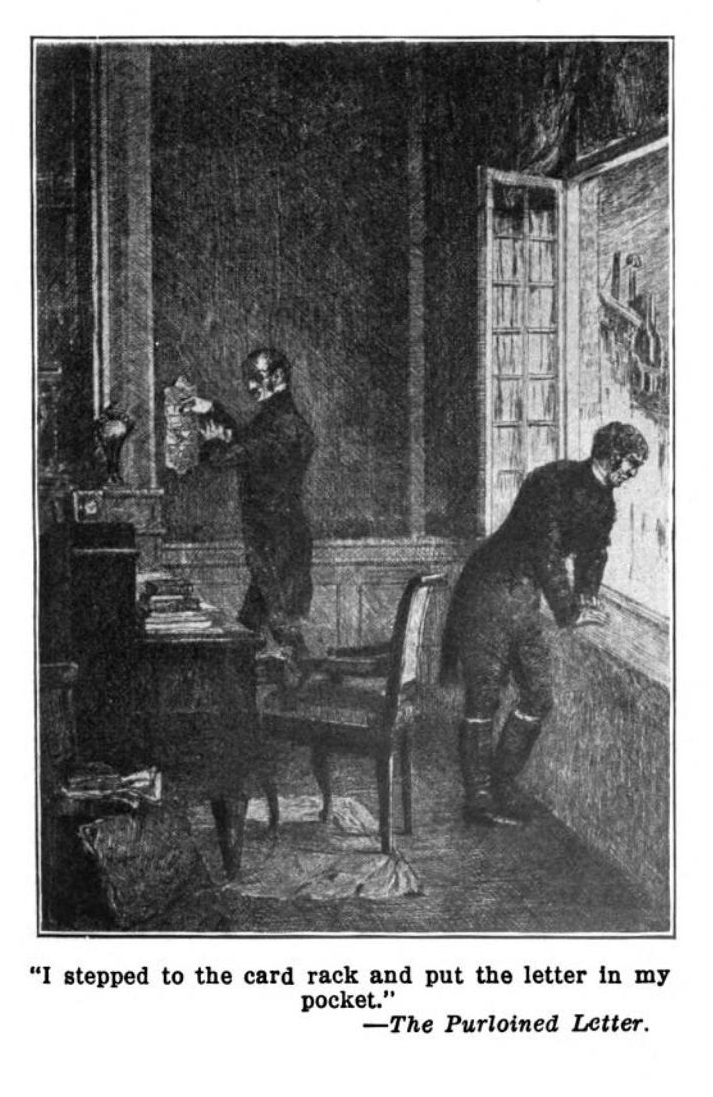
"I stepped to the card rack and put the letter in my pocket" illustration, c. 1864

In May 1844, just before its first publication, Poe wrote to James Russell Lowell that he considered "The Purloined Letter" "perhaps the best of my tales of ratiocination." When it was republished in The Gift in 1845, the editor called it "one of the aptest illustrations which could well be conceived of that curious play of two minds in one person."

Poe's story provoked a debate among literary theorists in the 1960s and 1970s. Jacques Lacan argued in Ecrits that the content of the queen's letter is irrelevant to the story and that the proper "place" of the signifier (the letter itself) is determined by the symbolic structure in which it exists and is displaced, first by the minister and then by Dupin. Jacques Derrida responded to Lacan's reading in "Le Facteur de la vérité" ("The Purveyor of Truth"), questioning Lacan's structuralist assumptions. The triangular relationships that Lacan claims are foundational to the story are not, in fact, more foundational than other structured relationships one can perceive in it. Derrida sees Lacan's reading as yet another structuralist attempt to establish an ultimate, foundational truth to the story. In reality, according to Derrida, none of the structural schemas one can see in the story are more foundational than any other. Lacan's structuralist reading and Derrida's deconstructive reading provoked a response by Barbara Johnson, who mediated the debate by suggesting that the letter belongs all along to the queen as a substitute for a phallus.

Donald E. Pease suggests that Lacan "equates the possession of a letter—defined as a 'lack' of content—with 'literal' as opposed to 'symbolic' castration, hence the odor of the feminine. In other words the 'possession' of the lack otherwise displaced by language identifies the possessor with the lack 'she' thinks she possesses. So femininity exists as an 'effect' of the delusion of possession of a lack otherwise displaced (as a masculine effect?) by the endless purloining of the letter."

The debate up to the mid-1980s is collected in a helpful though incomplete volume titled The Purloined Poe. The volume does not include, for instance, Richard Hull's reading based on the work of Michel Foucault, in which he argues that "'The Purloined Letter' is a good text for questioning the metalinguistic claim that artists can't avoid doing surveillance, because it is a discourse on poetry's superiority over surveillance." Slavoj Žižek asks "So why does a letter always arrive at its destination? Why could it not—sometimes at least—also fail to reach it?" Hollis Robbins critiques Derrida for his own blindness to patriotism in prefacing his reading of "The Purloined Letter" with a reading of "The Emperor's New Clothes": "In Derrida's view, both Poe's story and Andersen's feature a king whose manhood is imperiled, who is surrounded by habit-driven and ineffectual civil servants, and who is saved by an individual who sees what is obvious. ... Both save the crown from further embarrassment. ... There is never a question that a king could or should fall from grace."

== Adaptations ==
- In 1948, NBC University Theater aired an adaptation starring Adolphe Menjou as C. Auguste Dupin.
- "The Purloined Letter" was adapted in an episode of the 1950s television series Suspense, but the events were portrayed in a linear fashion.
- In 1995, the story was adapted for an episode of the children's television program Wishbone. The episode was titled "The Pawloined Paper".
- In 2013 a theatrical adaptation of the story by Lance Tait was published. Ava Caridad wrote that "The Purloined Letter...lends itself well to a one-act play."

== Sources ==
- Butti de Lima, Paolo (2007). "La sentenza rubata: il Seneca di Poe". Quaderni di Storia (65): 83–128.
- Cornelius, Kay (2002). "Biography of Edgar Allan Poe". In Harold Bloom (ed.). Bloom's BioCritiques: Edgar Allan Poe. Philadelphia, PA: Chelsea House Publishers. ISBN 978-0-7910-6173-2.
- Derrida, Jacques (1987). The Post Card: From Socrates to Freud and Beyond (Paperback ed.). Chicago: University of Chicago Press. ISBN 978-0-226-14322-4.
- Garner, Stanton (1990). "Emerson, Thoreau, and Poe's 'Double Dupin'". In Fisher, Benjamin Franklin IV (ed.). Poe and His Times: The Artist and His Milieu. Baltimore: The Edgar Allan Poe Society. ISBN 978-0-9616449-2-5.
- Meyers, Jeffrey (1992). Edgar Allan Poe: His Life and Legacy (Paperback ed.). New York: Cooper Square Press. ISBN 978-0-8154-1038-6.
- Ostram, John Ward (1987). "Poe's Literary Labors and Rewards". In Fisher, Benjamin Franklin IV (ed.). Myths and Reality: The Mysterious Mr. Poe. Baltimore: The Edgar Allan Poe Society. pp. 37–47.
- Phillips, Mary E. (1926). Edgar Allan Poe: The Man. Volume II. Chicago: The John C. Winston Co.
- Quinn, Arthur Hobson (1998). Edgar Allan Poe: A Critical Biography. Baltimore: Johns Hopkins University Press. ISBN 978-0-8018-5730-0.
- Rosenheim, Shawn James (1997). The Cryptographic Imagination: Secret Writing from Edgar Poe to the Internet. Baltimore: Johns Hopkins University Press. ISBN 978-0-8018-5332-6.
- Whalen, Terance (2001). "Poe and the American Publishing Industry". In Kennedy, J. Gerald (ed.). A Historical Guide to Edgar Allan Poe. New York: Oxford University Press. ISBN 978-0-19-512150-6.
