= The Murders in the Rue Morgue =

1841 short story by Edgar Allan Poe

- Short story by Edgar Allan Poe
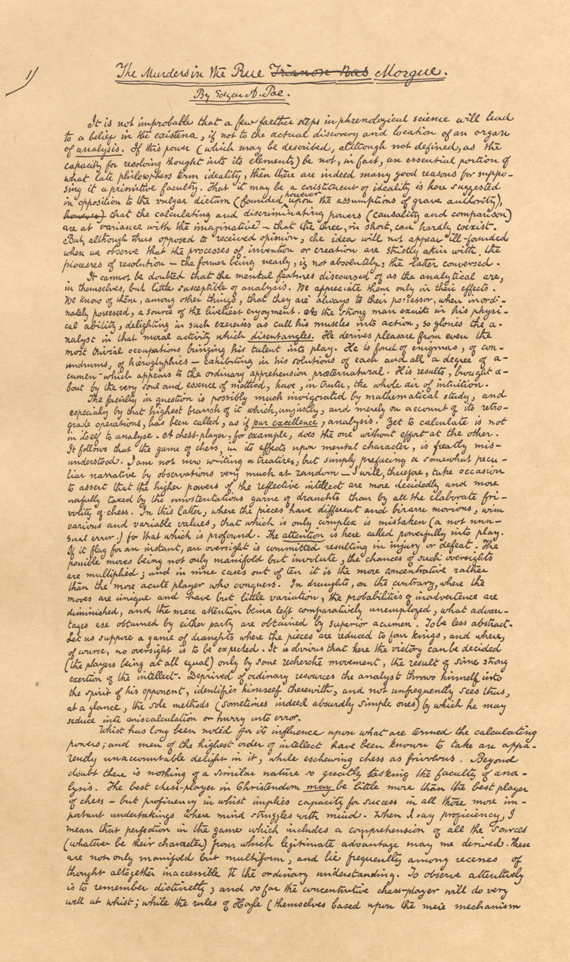
- Facsimile of Poe's original manuscript for "The Murders in the Rue Morgue"

Text available at Wikisource
- Country: United States
- Language: English
- Genres: Detective fiction Short story

Publication
- Published in: Graham's Magazine
- Media type: Print (Magazine)
- Publication date: April 1841

"The Murders in the Rue Morgue" is a short story by the American writer and literary critic Edgar Allan Poe published in Graham's Magazine in 1841. It has been described as the first modern detective story; Poe referred to it as one of his "tales of ratiocination".

C. Auguste Dupin is a man in Paris who solves the mystery of the brutal murder of two women. Numerous witnesses heard a suspect, though no one agrees on what language was spoken. At the murder scene, Dupin finds clues suggesting that the killer was not human.

As the first fictional detective, Poe's Dupin displays many traits which became literary conventions in subsequent fictional detectives, including Sherlock Holmes and Hercule Poirot. Many later characters, for example, follow Poe's model of the brilliant detective, his personal friend who serves as narrator, and the final revelation being presented before the reasoning that leads up to it. Dupin himself reappears in "The Mystery of Marie Rogêt" and "The Purloined Letter".

== Plot summary ==
The unnamed narrator opens with a lengthy commentary on the nature and practice of analytical reasoning, then describes the circumstances under which he first met Dupin during a visit to Paris. The two share rooms in a dilapidated old mansion and allow no visitors, having cut off all contact with past acquaintances and venturing outside only at night. One evening, Dupin demonstrates his analytical prowess by deducing the narrator's thoughts about a particular stage actor, based on clues gathered from the narrator's previous words and actions.

Dupin and the narrator read the newspaper accounts of a baffling double murder. Madame L'Espanaye and her daughter Camille have been found dead at their home in the Rue Morgue, (Note: French for "Morgue Street".) a fictional street in Paris. The mother was found in a yard behind the house, with multiple broken bones and her throat so deeply cut that her head fell off when the body was moved. Camille was found strangled to death and stuffed upside down into a chimney, wedged so tightly that it took the strength of several men to pull her loose. The murders occurred in a fourth-floor room that was locked from the inside; on the floor were found a bloody straight razor, bloody tufts of gray hair, and two bags of gold coins. Several witnesses reported hearing two voices at the time of the murder, one male and French, but disagreed on the language spoken by the other. The speech was unclear, and all witnesses claimed not to know the language the second voice was speaking.

A bank clerk named Adolphe Le Bon, who had delivered the gold coins to the ladies the day before, is arrested even though there is no other evidence linking him to the crime. Remembering a service that Le Bon once performed for him, Dupin offers his assistance to "G–", the prefect of police.

Because none of the witnesses can agree on the language of the second voice, Dupin concludes they were not hearing a human voice at all. He and the narrator examine the house thoroughly; Dupin dismisses the idea of Le Bon's guilt and a robbery motive, citing the fact that the gold was not taken. He points out that the murderer would have had to have superhuman strength to force Camille's body up the chimney. He formulates a method by which the murderer could have entered the room and killed both women, involving an agile climb up a lightning rod and a leap to a set of open window shutters. Showing an unusual tuft of hair from the scene, Dupin concludes that an "Ourang-Outang" (orangutan) killed the women. He places an advertisement in the newspaper asking if anyone has lost such an animal, and a sailor arrives looking for it.

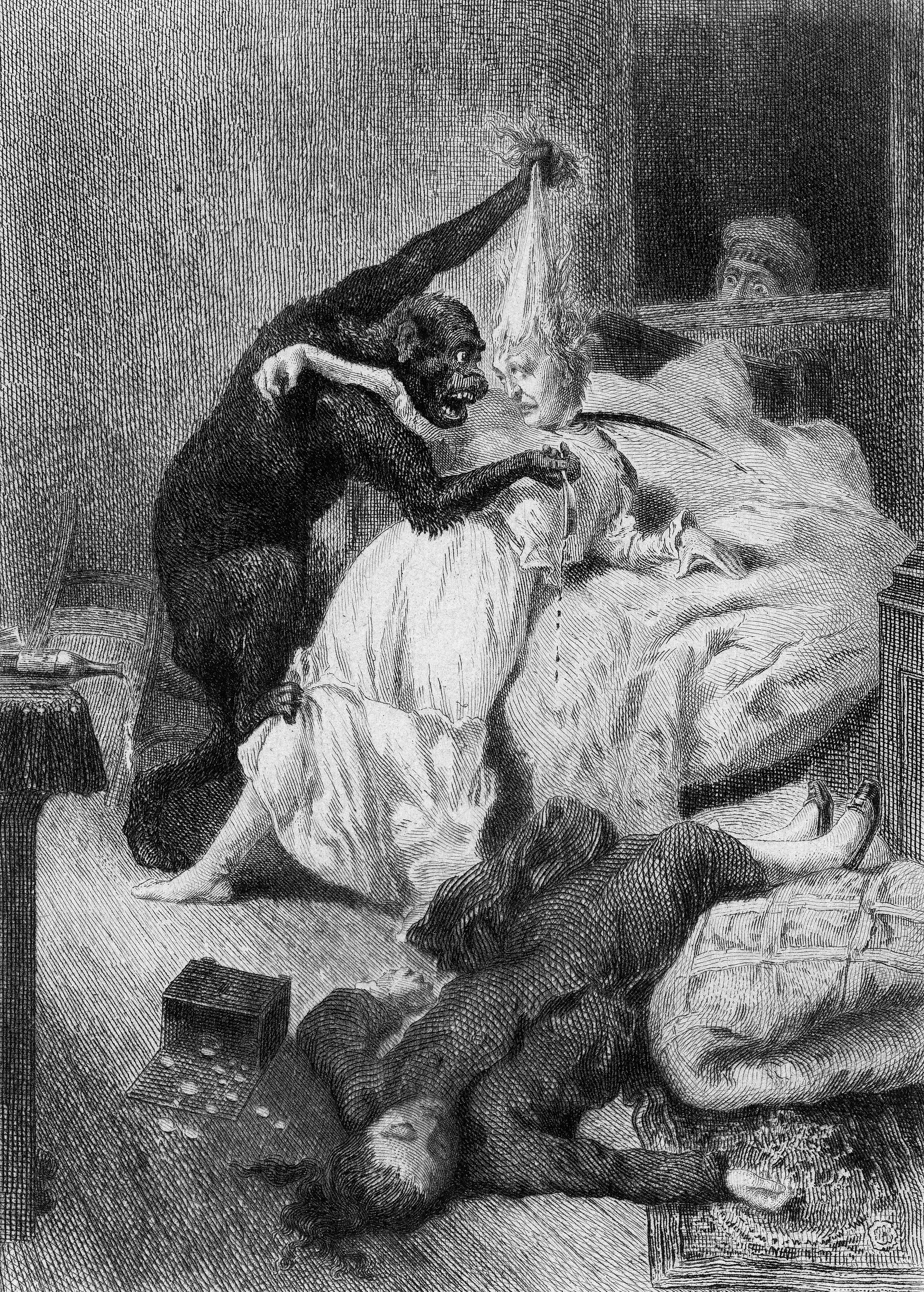
Illustration by Daniel Vierge of "The Murders in the Rue Morgue", 1870.

The sailor offers a reward, but Dupin is interested only in learning the circumstances behind the two murders. The sailor explains that he captured the orangutan while in Borneo and brought it back to Paris, intending to sell it, but had trouble keeping it under control. When he saw the Bornean orangutan attempting to shave its face with his straight razor, imitating his morning grooming, it fled into the streets and reached the Rue Morgue, where it climbed up and into the house. The orangutan seized the mother by the hair and was waving the razor, imitating a barber; when she screamed in fear, it flew into a rage, ripped her hair out, slashed her throat, and strangled Camille. The sailor climbed up the lightning rod in an attempt to catch the animal, and the two voices heard by witnesses belonged to it and him. Fearing punishment by its master, the orangutan threw the mother's body out the window and stuffed Camille into the chimney before fleeing.

The sailor sells the orangutan, Le Bon is released from custody, and an embarrassed G– sarcastically remarks that people should mind their own business. Dupin comments to the narrator that G– is "somewhat too cunning to be profound", but admires his ability "de nier ce qui est, et d'expliquer ce qui n'est pas" (a quote from Julie; or, The New Heloise by Jean-Jacques Rousseau: "to deny that which is, and explain that which is not").

== Themes and analysis ==
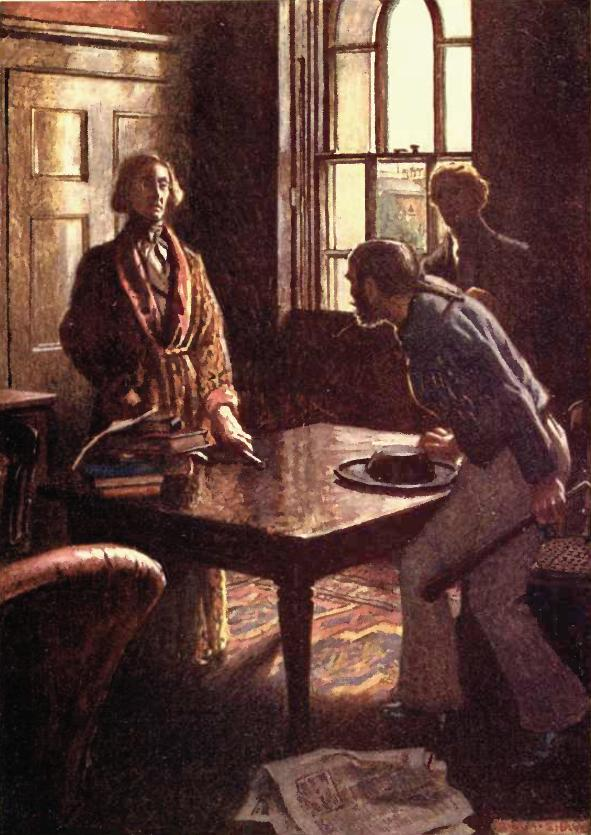
The moment Dupin questions the sailor about the murders. Illustration by Byam Shaw for a London edition dated 1909 with caption "The sailor's face flushed up; he started to his feet and grasped his cudgel".

In a letter to friend Joseph Snodgrass, Poe said of "The Murders in the Rue Morgue", "its theme was the exercise of ingenuity in detecting a murderer". Dupin is not a professional detective; he decides to investigate the murders in the Rue Morgue for his personal amusement. He also has a desire for truth and to prove a falsely accused man innocent. His interests are not financial and he even declines a monetary reward from the owner of the orangutan. The revelation of the actual murderer removes the crime, as neither the orangutan nor its owner can be held responsible. Poe scholar Arthur Hobson Quinn speculates that later detective stories might have set up M. Le Bon, the suspect who is arrested, as appearing guilty as a red herring, though Poe chose not to.

Poe wrote "The Murders in the Rue Morgue" at a time when crime was at the forefront in people's minds due to urban development. London had recently established its first professional police force and American cities were beginning to focus on scientific police work as newspapers reported murders and criminal trials. "The Murders in the Rue Morgue" continues an urban theme that was used several times in Poe's fiction, in particular "The Man of the Crowd", likely inspired by Poe's time living in Philadelphia.

The tale has an underlying metaphor for the battle of brains vs. brawn. Physical strength, depicted as the orangutan as well as its owner, stand for violence: the orangutan is a murderer, while its owner admits he has abused the animal with a whip. The analyst's brainpower overcomes their violence. The story also contains Poe's often-used theme of the death of a beautiful woman, which he called the "most poetical topic in the world".

=== Dupin's method ===
Poe defines Dupin's method, ratiocination, using the example of a card player: "the extent of information obtained; lies not so much in the validity of the inference as in the quality of the observation". Poe then provides a narrative example where Dupin explains how he knew the narrator was thinking about the actor Chantilly. Dupin then applies his method to the solving of this crime.

Dupin's method emphasizes the importance of reading and the written word. The newspaper accounts pique his curiosity; he learns about orangutans from a written account by "Cuvier" — likely Georges Cuvier, the French zoologist. This method also engages the reader, who follows along by reading the clues himself. Poe also emphasizes the power of the spoken word. When Dupin asks the sailor for information about the murders, the sailor himself acts out a partial death: "The sailor's face flushed up as if he were struggling with suffocation... the next moment he fell back into his seat, trembling violently, and with the countenance of death itself".

== Literary significance and reception ==
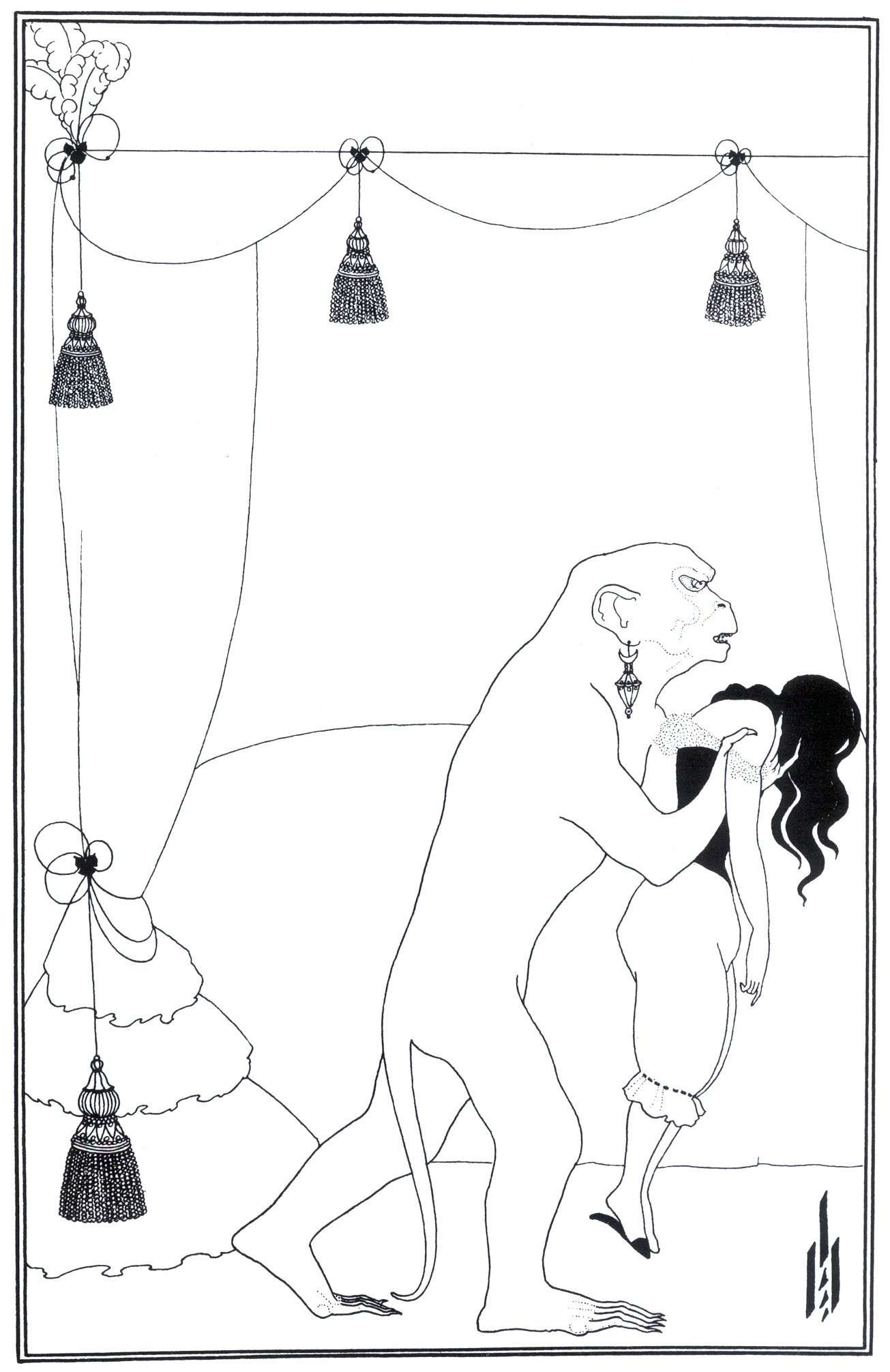
Illustration by Aubrey Beardsley of "The Murders in the Rue Morgue", 1895.

Poe biographer Jeffrey Meyers sums up the significance of "The Murders in the Rue Morgue" by saying it "changed the history of world literature". Often cited as the first detective fiction story, the character of Dupin became the prototype for many future fictional detectives, including Arthur Conan Doyle's Sherlock Holmes and Agatha Christie's Hercule Poirot. The genre is distinctive from a general mystery story in that the focus is on analysis. Poe's role in the creation of the detective story is reflected in the Edgar Awards, given annually by the Mystery Writers of America.

"The Murders in the Rue Morgue" also established many tropes that would become common elements in mystery fiction: the eccentric but brilliant detective, the bumbling constabulary, the first-person narration by a close personal friend. Poe also portrays the police in an unsympathetic manner as a sort of foil to the detective. Poe also initiates the storytelling device where the detective announces his solution and then explains the reasoning leading up to it. It is also the first locked room mystery in detective fiction. On the other hand, unlike many detective stories that followed, Poe's story does not allow the reader to plausibly deduce the solution before it is revealed; the readers are unlikely to include an orangutan on their list of potential suspects.

Upon its release, "The Murders in the Rue Morgue" and its author were praised for the creation of a new profound novelty. The Pennsylvania Inquirer printed that "it proves Mr Poe to be a man of genius... with an inventive power and skill, of which we know no parallel". Poe, however, downplayed his achievement in a letter to Philip Pendleton Cooke:

These tales of ratiocination owe most of their popularity to being something in a new key. I do not mean to say that they are not ingenious – but people think them more ingenious than they are – on account of their method and air of method. In the "Murders in the Rue Morgue", for instance, where is the ingenuity in unraveling a web which you yourself... have woven for the express purpose of unraveling?"

== Inspiration ==
The word detective did not exist at the time Poe wrote "The Murders in the Rue Morgue", though there were other stories that featured similar problem-solving characters. Das Fräulein von Scuderi (1819), by E. T. A. Hoffmann, in which Mlle. de Scuderi, a kind of 19th-century Miss Marple, establishes the innocence of the police's favorite suspect in the murder of a jeweler, is sometimes cited as the first detective story. Other forerunners include Voltaire's Zadig (1748), with a main character who performs similar feats of analysis, themselves borrowed from The Three Princes of Serendip, an Italian rendition of Amir Khusro's "Hasht-Bihisht".

Poe may also have been expanding on previous analytical works of his own including the essay on "Maelzel's Chess Player" and the comedic "Three Sundays in a Week". As for the twist in the plot, Poe was likely inspired by the crowd reaction to an orangutan on display at the Masonic Hall in Philadelphia in July 1839. Poe might have picked up some of the relevant biological knowledge from collaborating with Thomas Wyatt, with Poe furthermore linking "his narrative with the subject of evolution, especially the studies done by Cuvier", possibly also influenced by the studies conducted by Lord Monboddo, though it has been argued that Poe's information was "more literary than scientific".

The name of the main character may have been inspired from the "Dupin" character in a series of stories first published in Burton's Gentleman's Magazine in 1828 called "Unpublished passages in the Life of Vidocq, the French Minister of Police". Poe would likely have known the story, which features an analytical man who discovers a murderer, though the two plots share little resemblance. Murder victims in both stories, however, have their neck cut so badly that the head is almost entirely removed from the body. Dupin actually mentions Vidocq by name, dismissing him as "a good guesser".

== Publication history ==
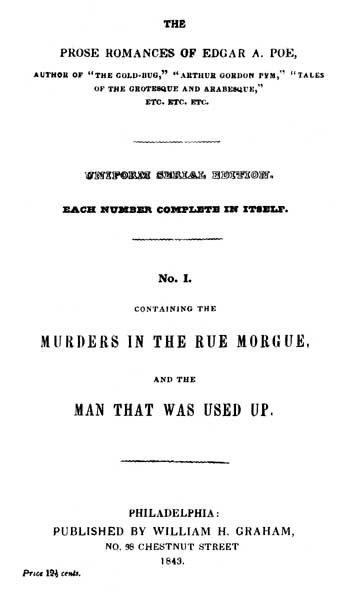
The Prose Romances of Edgar A. Poe, No. I, William H. Graham, Philadelphia, 1843.

Poe wrote the short story in Philadelphia, where he resided at various locations from 1838 to 1844.

Poe originally titled the story "The Murders in the Rue Trianon-Bas" but renamed it to better associate with death. "The Murders in the Rue Morgue" first appeared in Graham's Magazine in April 1841 while Poe was working as an editor. He was paid an additional $56 (equivalent to $1,748 in 2025) for it — an unusually high figure; he was paid only $9 (equivalent to $311 in 2025) for "The Raven" in 1845. In 1843, Poe had the idea to print a series of pamphlets with his stories entitled The Prose Romances of Edgar A. Poe. He printed only one, "The Murders in the Rue Morgue" oddly collected with the satirical "The Man That Was Used Up". It sold for 12 and a half cents. This version included 52 changes from the original text from Graham's, including the new line: "The Prefect is somewhat too cunning to be profound", a change from the original "too cunning to be acute". "The Murders in the Rue Morgue" was also reprinted in Wiley & Putnam's collection of Poe's stories simply called Tales. Poe did not take part in selecting which tales would be collected.

Poe's sequel to "The Murders in the Rue Morgue" was "The Mystery of Marie Rogêt", first serialized in December 1842 and January 1843. Though subtitled "A Sequel to 'The Murders in the Rue Morgue'", "The Mystery of Marie Rogêt" shares very few common elements with "The Murders in the Rue Morgue" beyond the inclusion of C. Auguste Dupin and the Paris setting. Dupin reappeared in "The Purloined Letter", which Poe called "perhaps the best of my tales of ratiocination" in a letter to James Russell Lowell in July 1844.

The original manuscript of "The Murders in the Rue Morgue" which was used for its first printing in Graham's Magazine was discarded in a wastebasket. An apprentice at the office, J. M. Johnston, retrieved it and left it with his father for safekeeping. It was left in a music book, where it survived three house fires before being bought by George William Childs. In 1891, Childs presented the manuscript, re-bound with a letter explaining its history, to Drexel University. Childs had also donated $650 (equivalent to $19,057 in 2025) for the completion of Edgar Allan Poe's new grave monument in Baltimore, Maryland, in 1875.

"The Murders in the Rue Morgue" was one of the earliest of Poe's works to be translated into French. Between June 11 and June 13, 1846, a translation titled "Un meurtre sans exemple dans les Fastes de la Justice" was published in La Quotidienne, a Paris newspaper. It was signed "G. B.", with Poe's name not mentioned. Many details were changed; the street "Rue Morgue" became "rue de l'Ouest", while "Dupin" became "Bernier". On October 12, 1846, another uncredited translation, renamed "Une Sanglante Enigme", was published in Le Commerce. The editor of Le Commerce was accused of plagiarizing the story from La Quotidienne. The accusation went to trial and the public discussion brought Poe's name to the attention of the French public.

== Adaptations ==
"The Murders in the Rue Morgue" has been adapted into several films. At least four films of the early silent era borrowed from "The Murders in the Rue Morgue". One was Sherlock Holmes in the Great Murder Mystery (1908) in which an escaped gorilla attacks and kills a young woman in her home. In 1914 a film promoted as a three-reel "comedy-drama" titled The Phantom Thief involves a monkey stealing a pearl necklace. Other films from the era where an ape-like creature murders or is convicted of murder include Who Killed Olga Carew? (1913) and The Orang-Outang (1915). A film adaptation of the story came out in 1914 starring Paul Clemons. The film was later released as The Mystery of the Rue Morgue.

Director Robert Florey first mentioned the story "Murders in the Rue Morgue" to Universal Studios in March 1930, at which time Dracula was on release and Frankenstein (1931) was in pre-production, so planning an adaptation of Poe's story did not begin until 1931. The film starred Bela Lugosi leading much of Poe's story changed to accommodate for him; Florey said he "had to strengthen and lengthen the Poe short story" and that he "added numerous characters". According to the book Universal Horrors, Murders in the Rue Morgue's critical reception on its release was "harsh". Later adaptations of "The Murders in the Rue Morgue" include Phantom of the Rue Morgue (1954), a color 3D film that was produced by Warner Bros. Gordon Hessler directed a 1971 adaptation of Murders in the Rue Morgue, which is closer to being an adaptation of Phantom of the Opera than of Poe's tale. According to Hessler, "the problem with the original story, which is a mystery where the 'monkey' did it, was not the kind of story you could do anymore". A 1986 television adaptation of the story was directed by Jeannot Szwarc and stars George C. Scott as Auguste Dupin. In the 2023 Netflix miniseries The Fall of the House of Usher, Auguste Dupin is reimagined as an Assistant United States Attorney. The third episode of the series is titled "Murder in the Rue Morgue" and features a character, Camille L'Espanaye, being killed by a chimpanzee in a medical testing facility nicknamed the "Rue Morgue".

In 1975, the story was adapted as a radio play on the CBS Radio Mystery Theater hosted by E. G. Marshall.

The story has also been adapted as a video game by Big Fish Games for their Dark Tales franchise, under the title Dark Tales: Edgar Allan Poe's Murders in the Rue Morgue.

In 1981, British heavy metal band Iron Maiden released a song called "Murders in the Rue Morgue" on their second album Killers.

== See also ==
- Rue Morgue (magazine)
- Rue Morgue Radio
