= The Three Princes of Serendip =

1557 book by Cristoforo Armeno

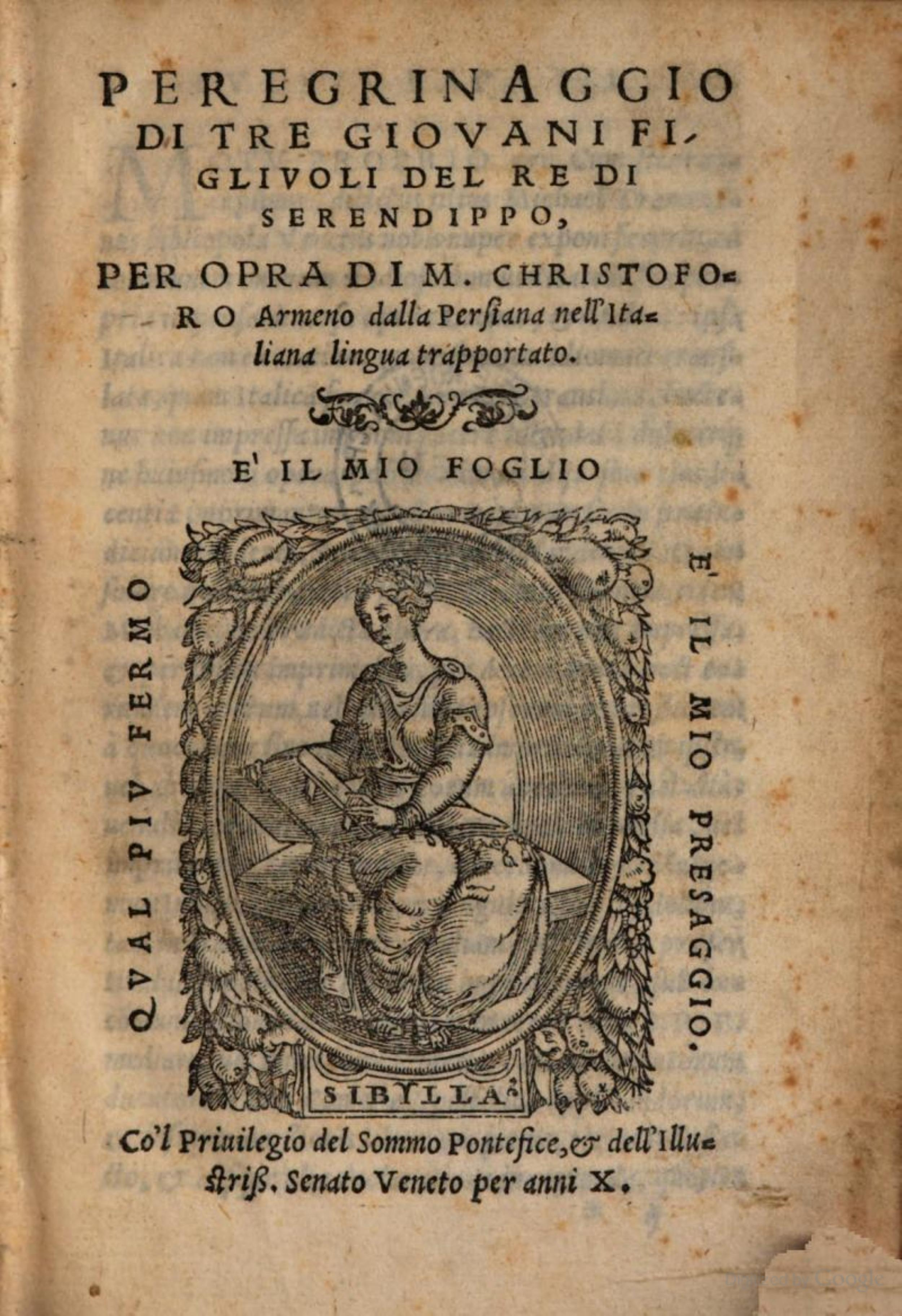

"The Three Princes of Serendip" is the English version of the story Peregrinaggio di tre giovani figliuoli del re di Serendippo ('Pilgrimage of the three young sons of the king of Serendippo'), published by Michele Tramezzino in Venice in 1557. Tramezzino claimed to have heard the story from Cristoforo Armeno, who had translated the Persian fairy tale into Italian, adapting Book One of Amir Khusrau's Hasht Bihisht of 1302. The story first came to English via a French translation, and now exists in several out-of-print translations. Serendip is the Classical Persian name for Sri Lanka (Ceylon).

The story has become known in the English-speaking world as the source of the word serendipity, coined by Horace Walpole because of his recollection of the part of the "silly fairy tale" in which the three princes by "accidents and sagacity" discern the nature of a lost camel. Voltaire used a version of the story in his 1747 Zadig, contributing to both the evolution of detective fiction and, some have argued, how the scientific method is understood.

== The story ==
"In ancient times there existed in the country of Serendippo, in the Far East, a great and powerful king by the name of Giaffer. He had three sons who were very dear to him. And being a good father and very concerned about their education, he decided that he had to leave them endowed not only with great power, but also with all kinds of virtues of which princes are particularly in need."

The father searches out the best possible tutors. "And to them he entrusted the training of his sons, with the understanding that the best they could do for him was to teach them in such a way that they could be immediately recognized as his very own."

When the tutors are pleased with the excellent progress that the three princes make in the arts and sciences, they report it to the king. He, however, still doubts their training, and summoning each in turn, declares that he will retire to the contemplative life leaving them as king. Each politely declines, affirming the father's superior wisdom and fitness to rule.

The king is pleased, but fearing that his sons' education may have been too sheltered and privileged, feigns anger at them for refusing the throne and sends them away from the land.

=== The lost camel ===
No sooner do the three princes arrive abroad they trace clues to identify precisely a camel they have never seen. They conclude that the camel is lame, blind in one eye, missing a tooth, carrying a pregnant woman, and bearing honey on one side and butter on the other. When they later encounter the merchant who has lost the camel, they report their observations to him. He accuses them of stealing the camel and takes them to the Emperor Beramo, where he demands punishment.

Beramo then asks how they are able to give such an accurate description of the camel if they have never seen it. It is clear from the princes' replies that they have used small clues to infer cleverly the nature of the camel.

Grass had been eaten from the side of the road where it was less green, so the princes had inferred that the camel was blind on the other side. Because there were lumps of chewed grass on the road that were the size of a camel's tooth, they inferred they had fallen through the gap left by a missing tooth. The tracks showed the prints of only three feet, the fourth being dragged, indicating that the animal was lame. That butter was carried on one side of the camel and honey on the other was evident because ants had been attracted to melted butter on one side of the road and flies to spilled honey on the other.

As for the woman, one of the princes said: "I guessed that the camel must have carried a woman, because I had noticed that near the tracks where the animal had knelt down the imprint of a foot was visible. Because some urine was nearby, I wet my fingers and as a reaction to its odour I felt a sort of carnal concupiscence, which convinced me that the imprint was of a woman's foot."

"I guessed that the same woman must have been pregnant", said another prince, "because I had noticed nearby handprints which were indicative that the woman, being pregnant, had helped herself up with her hands while urinating."

At this moment, a traveller enters the scene to say that he has just found a missing camel wandering in the desert. Beramo spares the lives of the three princes, lavishes rich rewards on them, and appoints them to be his advisors.

=== The story continues ===
The three princes have many other adventures, where they continue to display their sagacity, stories-within-stories are told, and there is a happy ending.

== History ==
The fairy tale The Three Princes of Serendip is based upon the life of Persian King Bahram V, who ruled the Sassanid Empire (420–440). Stories of his rule are told in epic poetry of the region (Firdausi's Shahnameh of 1010, Nizami's Haft Paykar of 1197, Khusrau's Hasht Bihisht of 1302), parts of which are based upon historical facts with embellishments derived from folklore going back hundreds of years to oral traditions in India and The Book of One Thousand and One Nights. With the exception of the well-known camel story, English translations are very hard to come by.

=== Talmudic version ===
A version of the fable of a camel blind in one eye is included in the Talmud, attributed to Rabbi Yochanan (180–279 CE). It implies that Gentiles, in comparison to Jews, defecate on the road — Jewish law has strong injunctions of modesty and cleanliness, including strict injunctions against open or public urination or defecation.

Rava relates the following in the name of Rabbi Yochanan:—"Two Jewish slaves were one day walking along, when their master, who was following, overheard the one saying to the other, 'There is a camel ahead of us, as I judge—for I have not seen—that is blind of one eye and laden with two skin-bottles, one of which contains wine and the other oil, while two drivers attend it, one of them an Israelite, and the other a Gentile.' 'You perverse men,' said their master, 'how can you fabricate such a story as that?' The slave answered, and gave this as his reason, 'The grass is cropped only on one side of the track [because the camel can only see the grass on one side], the wine, that must have dripped, has soaked into the earth on the right, and the oil has trickled down, and may be seen on the left; while one of the drivers turned aside from the track to ease himself, but the other has not even left the road for the purpose [i.e., the Gentile driver defecated on the road, while the Jew modestly stepped away from the road to do so].' Upon this the master stepped on before them in order to verify the correctness of their inferences, and found the conclusion true in every particular. He then turned back, and ... after complimenting the two slaves for their shrewdness, he at once gave them their liberty."

— Sanhedrin, fol. 104, col. 2.

=== Voltaire's Zadig ===
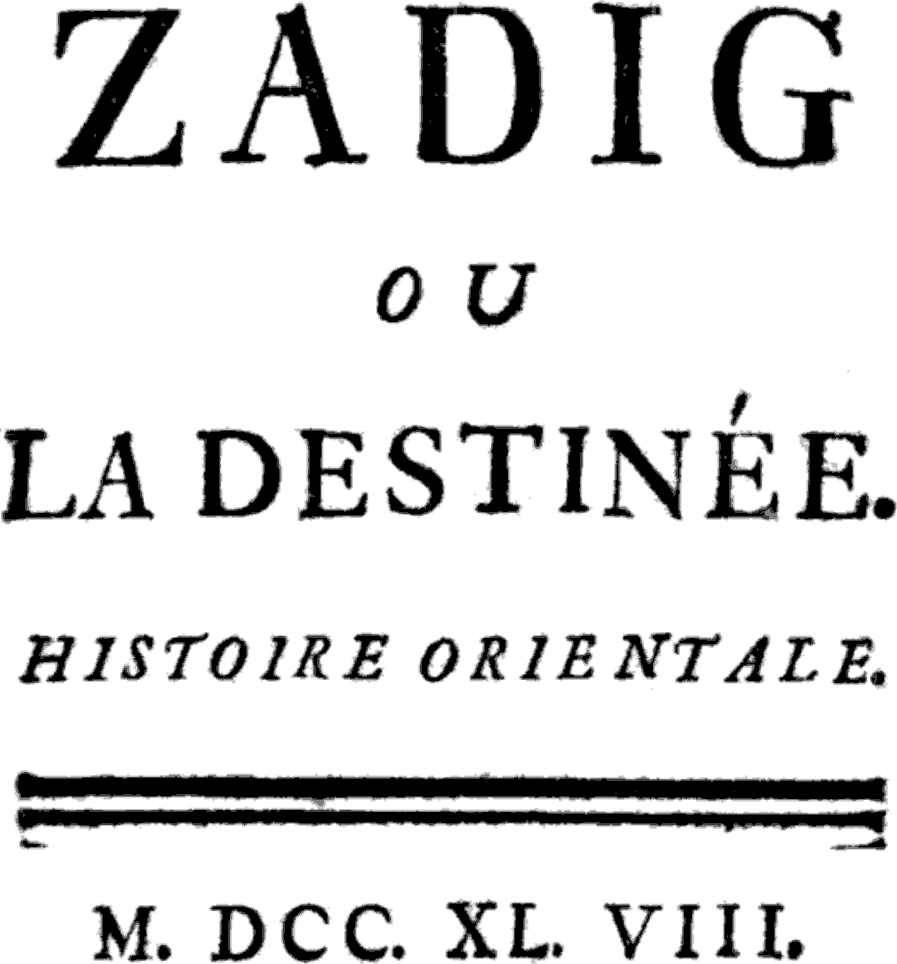
Title page of Voltaire's Zadig

In chapter three of Voltaire's 1747 novel Zadig, there is an adaptation of The Three Princes of Serendip, this time involving, instead of a camel, a horse and a dog, which the eponymous Zadig is able to describe in great detail from his observations of the tracks on the ground. When he is accused of theft and taken before the judges, Zadig clears himself by recounting the mental process which allows him to describe the two animals he has never seen: "I saw on the sand the tracks of an animal, and I easily judged that they were those of a little dog. Long, shallow furrows imprinted on little rises in the sand between the tracks of the paws informed me that it was a bitch whose dugs were hanging down, and that therefore she had had puppies a few days before."

==== Zadig's cultural influence ====
Zadig's detective work was influential. Cuvier wrote, in 1834, in the context of the new science of paleontology:

Today, anyone who sees only the print of a cloven hoof might conclude that the animal that had left it behind was a ruminator, and this conclusion is as certain as any in physics and in ethics. This footprint alone, then, provides the observer with information about the teeth, the jawbone, the vertebrae, each leg bone, the thighs, shoulders and pelvis of the animal which had just passed: it is a more certain proof than all Zadig's tracks.

T. H. Huxley, the proponent of Darwin's theories of evolution, also found Zadig's approach instructive, and wrote in his 1880 article "The method of Zadig":

What, in fact, lay at the foundation of all Zadig's arguments, but the coarse, commonplace assumption, upon which every act of our daily lives is based, that we may conclude from an effect to the pre-existence of a cause competent to produce that effect?

Edgar Allan Poe in his turn was probably inspired by Zadig when he created C. Auguste Dupin in "The Murders in the Rue Morgue", calling it a "tale of ratiocination" wherein "the extent of information obtained lies not so much in the validity of the inference as in the quality of the observation." Poe's M. Dupin stories mark the start of the modern detective fiction genre. Émile Gaboriau and Arthur Conan Doyle were perhaps also influenced by Zadig.

== In folkloristics ==
In folkloristics, the story of the Three Princes of Serendip is classified in the Aarne-Thompson-Uther Index as tale type ATU 655, "The Wise Brothers".

== See also ==
- The Tale of the Four Dervishes, another story collection by Amir Khusro
