= Azadeh (Shahnameh) =

Tribute girl harpist in Persian literature

Āzādeh (Persian: آزاده; lit. 'free') is a Roman tribute girl harpist in Shahnameh and other works in Persian literature. When Bahram-e Gur (Bahram V) was in al-Hirah, Azadeh became his favorite companion. She always accompanied him in hunting.

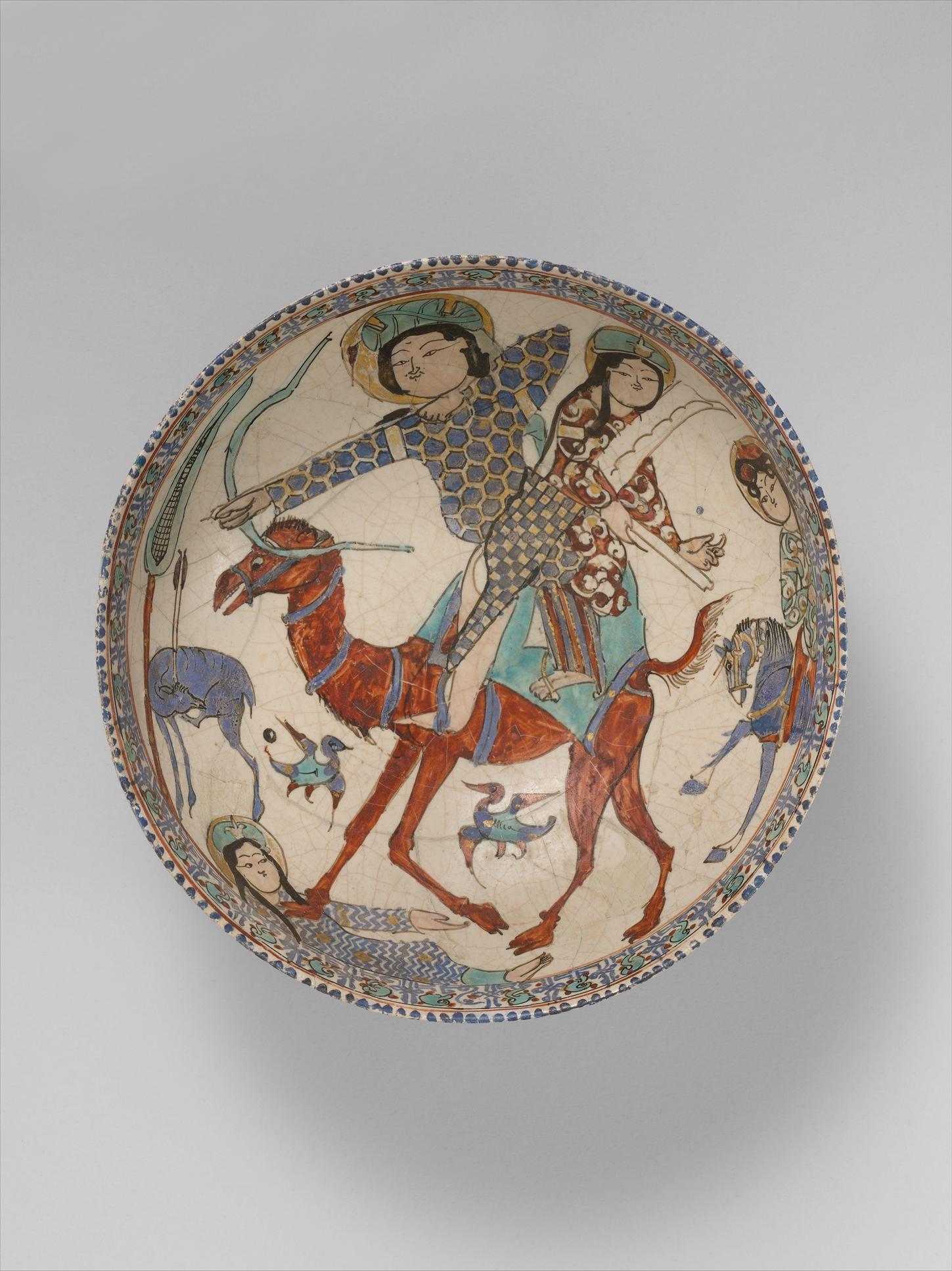
Bahram Gur pins together, with a single arrow, the ear and hoof of a gazelle while Azadeh plays the harp. Simultaneously, the camel tramples Azadeh for disparaging Bahram for his cruel feats. 12–13th century Kashan ceramic bowl.

The tale of Azadeh begins when she is invited by the king to a hunting trip. During the hunt, four gazelle turned up. When the king asked her, which gazelle to shoot, she challenged the king to make a female gazelle into a male, a male into a female and to pin the leg of one to its ear. There are sources that cite the impossibility of the tasks as a ploy to prevent the king from slaying the animals. Bahram completed all her requests. He severed the horns of the male gazelle with his two-headed arrow so that the animal resembled a female. Then, double-headed arrow hit the female gazelle on its forehead so that it resembled horns. Instead of praising the king, Azadeh stated that the king was assisted by demons. Bahram got angry and used his horse to trample Azadeh to death.

In the tale of Ferdowsi, Bahram's name meant "free" or "noble". Azadeh and Bahram were also mentioned in other works such as Nezami Ganjavi's Bahramnameh (also known as Haft Paykar) and Tha'alibi's Ḡorar. In Ganjavi's work, Azadeh was renamed Fetneh, which means "revolt". Azadeh appears as Dilaram (heart's ease) in Hasht-Behest by Amir Khusrau.

Bahram and Azadeh hunting was a popular subject in Persian miniature, and other media, such as mina'i ware paintings. The moment usually shown is when Azadeh challenges the king to pin a gazelle's foot to its shoulder with an arrow (when raising the foot to scratch itself).
