= Cristoforo Armeno =

Persian-Armenian writer

- کریستوف ارمنی
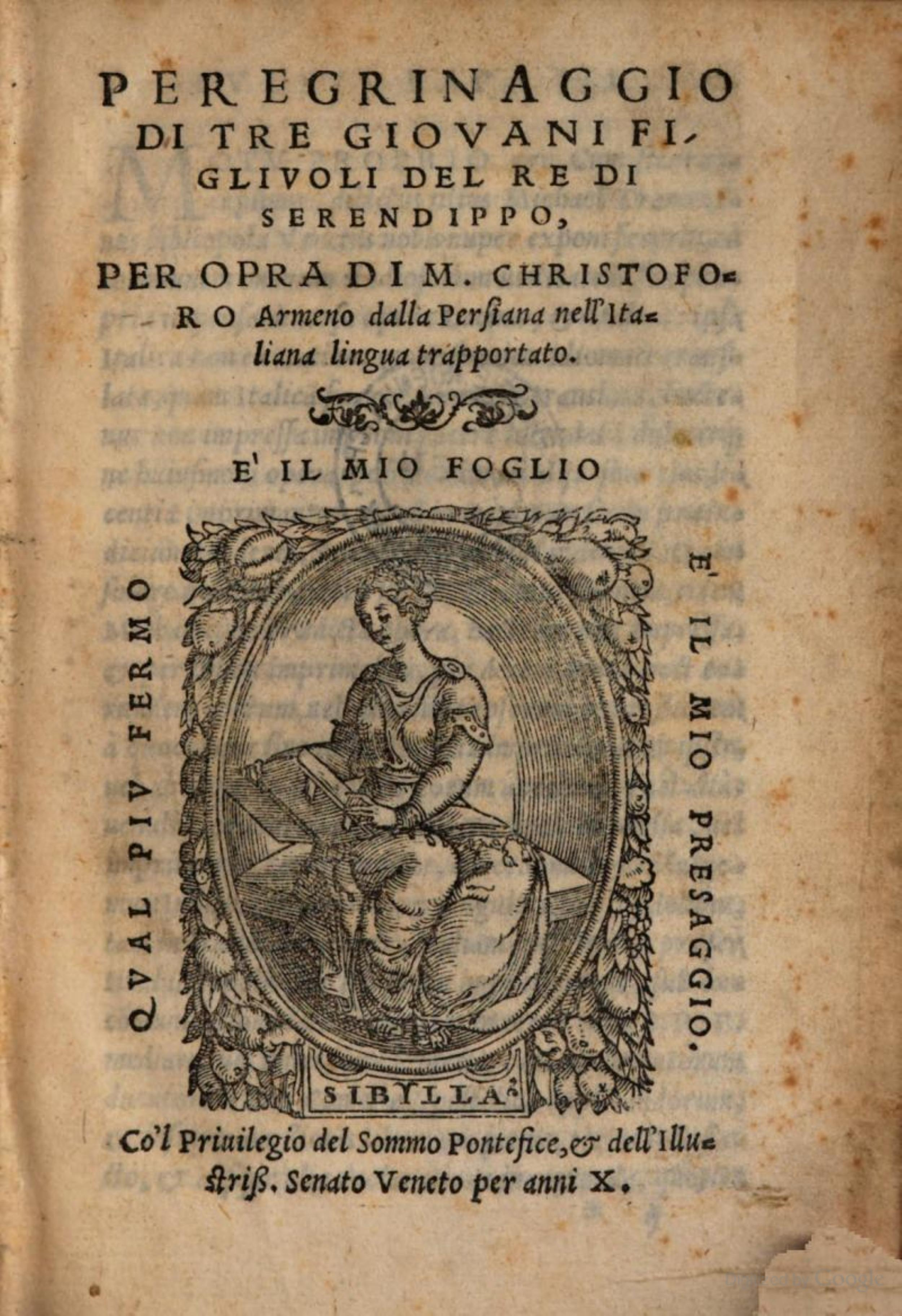
- Born: Before 1534; Tabriz
- Died: After 1557
- Other names: Christophe the Armenian
- Occupations: Translator, Writer
- Notable work: Peregrinaggio di tre giovani figliuoli del re di Serendippo

Cristoforo Armeno or Christophe the Armenian, born in Tabriz in the 16th century, was a translator from Persian. He is notably credited with the first translation from Persian to Italian of the Peregrinaggio di tre giovani figliuoli del re di Serendippo (The Three Princes of Serendip), in its editio princeps from Venice by the publisher Michele Tramezzino in 1557.

== Biography ==
A dual Italian investigation dispelled doubts about the existence of Christophe the Armenian.

Angelo Michele Piemontese's research in the Vatican archives unearthed a pass issued by Pope Julius III in 1552. This pass was issued to a masihi (Christian in Arabic) Armenian from Tabriz who had immigrated to Italy and was proficient in the Italian language, confirming Armeno's existence and linguistic abilities.

Renzo Bragantini's findings in the Venice archives revealed an Armenian with a strong command of oriental languages. This individual was regularly employed as an interpreter by the Republic of Venice and had a close friendship with Giuseppe Tramezzino, the nephew of the publisher of the Peregrinaggio. This friendship sheds light on Armeno's social circle and his connection to the publisher.

Therefore, it can be concluded that the Armenian and his friend Giuseppe were indeed the author-translators of the Persian collection.

== See also ==
- Serendipity
- Chevalier de Mailly
- The Three Princes of Serendip
