= Bahram V =

Shahanshah of the Sasanian Empire from 420 to 438

Bahram V 𐭥𐭫𐭧𐭫𐭠𐭭
- King of Kings of Iranians and non-Iranians
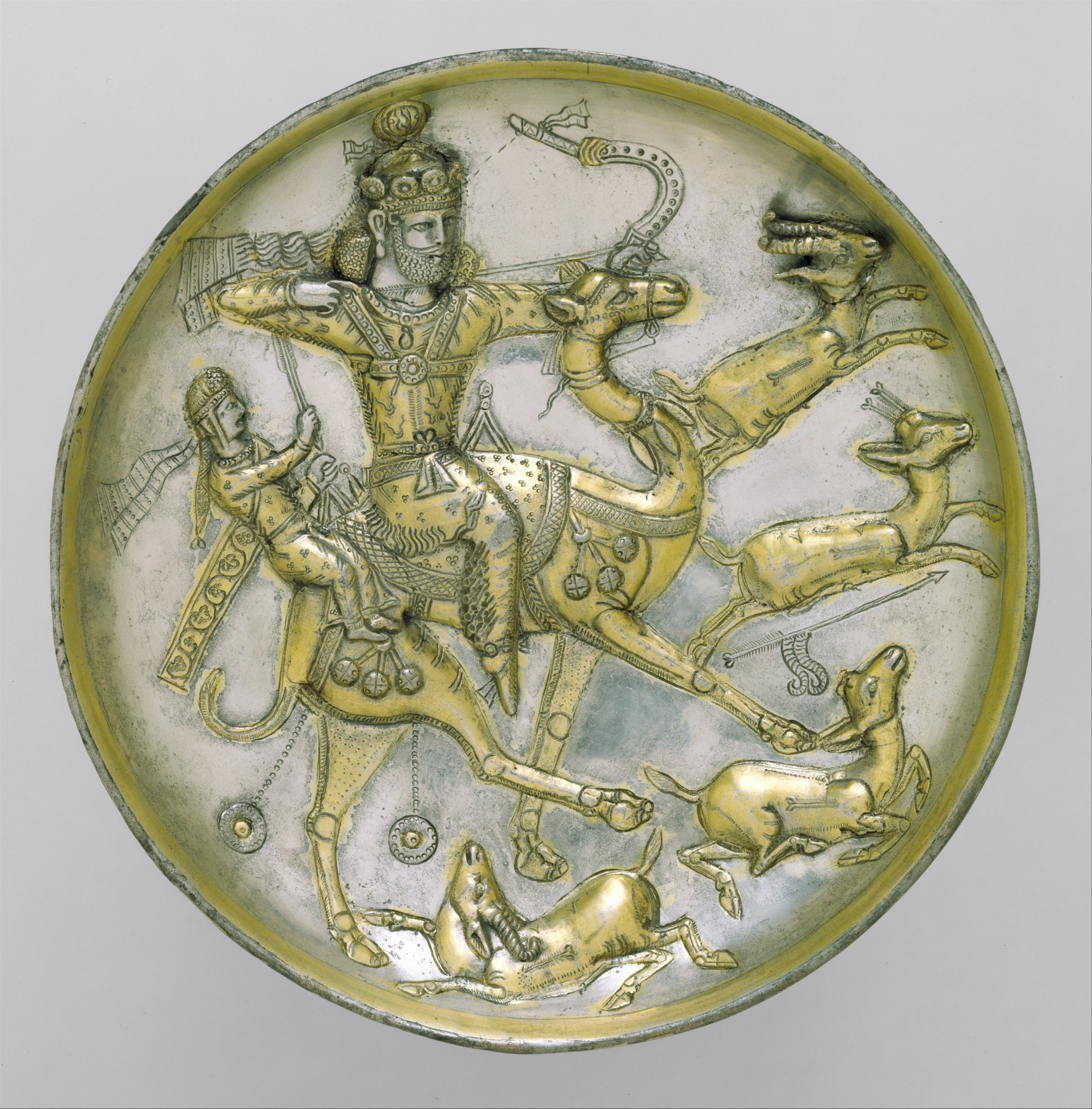
- 5th-century plate with a hunting scene from the tale of Bahram V and Azadeh.

Shahanshah of the Sasanian Empire
- Reign: 420–438
- Predecessor: Khosrow
- Successor: Yazdegerd II
- Born: 400
- Died: 438 (aged 38)
- Consort: Sapinud
- Issue: Yazdegerd II
- House: House of Sasan
- Father: Yazdegerd I
- Mother: Shushandukht
- Religion: Zoroastrianism

Bahram V (also spelled Wahram V or Warahran V; Middle Persian: 𐭥𐭫𐭧𐭫𐭠𐭭), also known as Bahram Gur (New Persian: بهرام گور, "Bahram the onager [hunter]"), was the Sasanian King of Kings (shahanshah) from 420 to 438.

The son of the incumbent Sasanian shah Yazdegerd I (r. 399–420), Bahram was at an early age sent to the Lahkmid court in al-Hira, where he was raised under the tutelage of the Lakhmid kings. After the assassination of his father, Bahram hurried to the Sasanian capital of Ctesiphon with a Lakhmid army, and won the favour of the nobles and priests, according to a long-existing popular legend, after withstanding a trial against two lions.

Bahram V's reign was generally peaceful, with two brief wars—first against his western neighbours, the Eastern Roman Empire, and then against his eastern neighbours, the Kidarites, who were disturbing the Sasanian eastern provinces. It was also during his reign that the Arsacid line of Armenia was replaced by a marzban (governor of a frontier province, "margrave"), which marked the start of a new era in Armenia, known in Armenian historiography as the "Marzpanate period".

Bahram V is a central figure in several of the most famous works in Persian literature. He is mentioned in Ferdowsi's Shahnameh ("Book of Kings") written between 977 and 1010, and he is the protagonist of Nizami Ganjavi's romantic epic Haft Peykar (also known as the "Bahramnameh"), written in 1197. The Seven Beauties were princesses, which—in Nizami's imagination—became Bahram's wives and each received her own residence in his palace. He visited them on a rotating basis, and they entertained him with exciting stories. He is also the focal point in the Hasht-Behesht ("Eight Paradises"), written by Amir Khusrau in ca. 1302.

Bahram V is remembered as one of the most famous kings in Iranian history, due to his cancellation of taxes and public debt at celebratory events, his encouragement of musicians, and his enjoyment of hunting. He was succeeded by his son Yazdegerd II (r. 438–457).

== Name ==
His theophoric name "Bahram" is the New Persian form of the Middle Persian Warahrān (also spelled Wahrām), which is derived from the Old Iranian Vṛθragna. The Avestan equivalent was Verethragna, the name of the old Iranian god of victory, whilst the Parthian version was *Warθagn. The name is transliterated in Greek as Baranes, whilst the Armenian transliteration is Vahagn/Vrām. The name is attested in Georgian as Baram and Latin as Vararanes Gororanes.

== Early life and rise to power ==
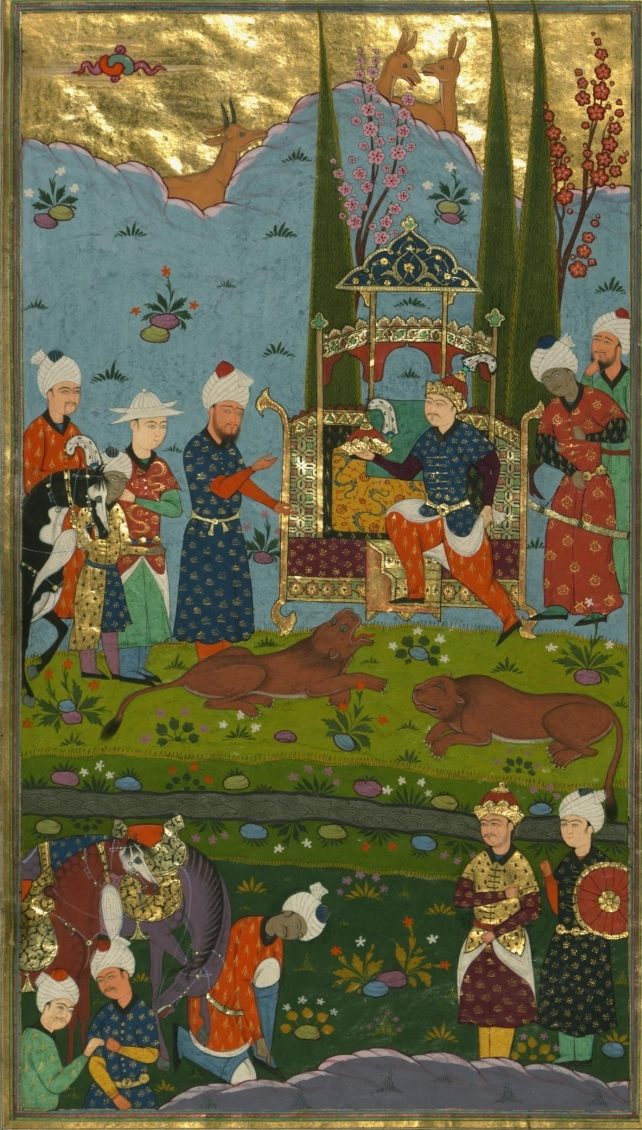
Bahram V seizes the crown after having killed two lions.

Bahram V was born around 400; according to folklore, he was born in Rusan, close to the city of Spahan. He was the son of shah Yazdegerd I (r. 399–420) and Shushandukht, a daughter of the Jewish exilarch. Richard Frye believes that Yazdegerd I's marriage to a daughter of the patriarch of the Jews is "probably folk tales", while Touraj Daryaee supports this story, stating that the Jews would see Bahram as a Jewish king due to his Jewish mother. Bahram, during his youth, was sent to the Lakhmid court in al-Hira, where he was raised under the tutelage of the Lakhmid king al-Nu'man I ibn Imru' al-Qays (r. 390–418). According to the modern historian O. Klíma, Bahram was probably sent there due to a disagreement with his father, while Giusto Traina suggests he was possibly sent there to avoid court intrigues.

At al-Hira, al-Nu'man provided Bahram with teachers from the Sasanian court, where the latter was taught law, archery, and equestrian arts. Since the death of the powerful Sasanian shah Shapur II (r. 309–379), the aristocrats and priests had expanded their influence and authority at the cost of the Sasanian government, nominating, dethroning, and murdering shahs, which included Yazdegerd I, who was murdered in 420. They now sought to stop the sons of Yazdegerd I from ascending the throne—Shapur IV, who was the eldest son of Yazdegerd I and governor of Armenia, quickly rushed to the Sasanian capital of Ctesiphon, and ascended the throne. He was, however, shortly after, murdered by the nobles and priests, who elected a son of Bahram IV, Khosrow, as shah.

Bahram was informed about the news of Yazdegerd I's death when he was in the Arabian Desert—he opposed the decision of the nobles, and asked al-Mundhir I ibn al-Nu'man (who had succeeded his father al-Nu'man I) for military assistance, who agreed to help him. Bahram and al-Mundhir, at the head of an army of numerous soldiers, marched towards Ctesiphon, where Bahram promised that he would not reign like his father Yazdegerd I did. According to a long-existing popular legend written in the Shahnameh ("Book of Kings"), Bahram suggested that the royal crown and attire should be placed between two lions, and the person who retrieved them by killing the wild animals should be recognized as the shah of Iran.

Khosrow chose to pull out, whilst Bahram withstood the trial and won the throne. Bahram distrusted the nobles, who had been unreliable to the earlier Sasanian shahs, and thus chose instead to seek support from the Zoroastrian priesthood. He was the first Sasanian shah to not be crowned by a noble, but by a chief priest (mowbed).

Bahram married an Indian princess and received the port of Debal in Sind as a dowry, together with the adjacent territories. The Indus delta and the coast of Sind were of great commercial and strategic value at that time as well. Bahram also systematically pursued a policy of tribal resettlement in these coastal regions. For instance, a large group of nomadic pastrolists known as Zutt (Jats) from Sind were settled in the marshes of southern Iraq by the emperor.

== Reign ==
=== War with Rome ===
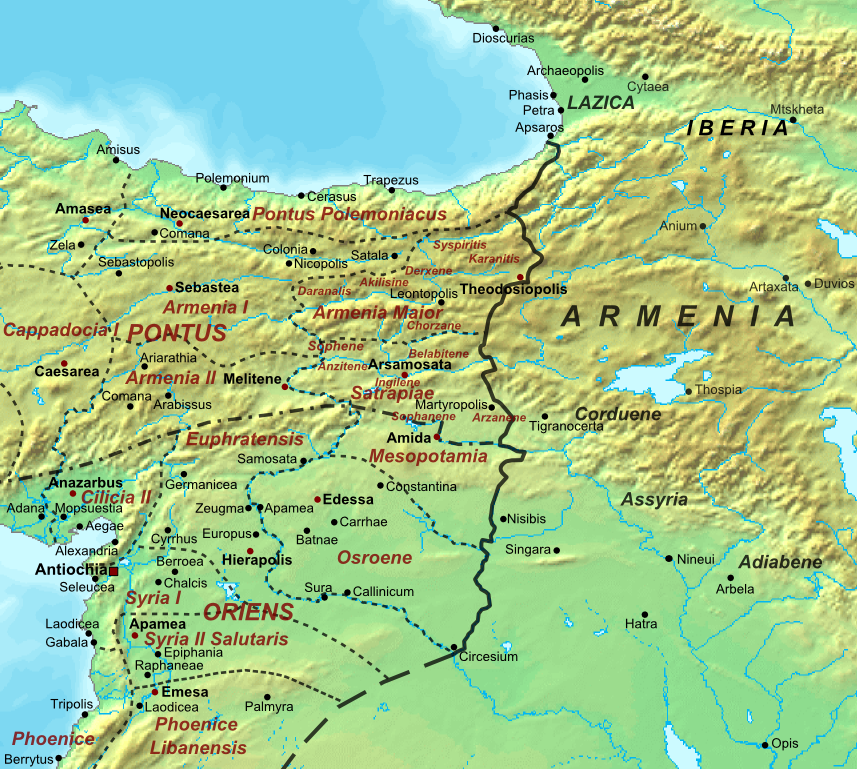
The Roman-Sasanian frontier

At the urging of the Zoroastrian priests and the Surenid minister (wuzurg framadar) Mihr Narseh, Bahram V began his reign with a systematic persecution of the Christians. The persecuted Christians fled to Roman territory, and were welcomed by the bishop of Constantinople, Atticus, who informed the Emperor of the persecution. The Eastern Roman Emperor Theodosius II was at the time deeply influenced by his religious sister Pulcheria, and had become more and more interested in Christianity. The Roman-Sasanian relationship already had some friction. The Sasanians had hired some Roman gold-diggers, but now refused to send them back; furthermore, they had also seized the properties of Roman merchants. So, when Sasanian ambassadors reached the Roman court to ask for the fugitives, Theodosius chose to break the peace and declare war, rather than giving them back.

In the year 421, the Romans sent their general Ardaburius with an extensive contingent into Armenia. The Iranian general Narses engaged Ardaburius in battle, but was defeated and forced to retreat. Narses planned to attack Mesopotamia, a Roman province that had been left unguarded, and moved there, but Ardaburius foresaw his enemy's plan and intercepted him there. Ardaburius shortly received reinforcements and put the fortress of Nisibis under siege, but withdrew in the face of an advancing army under Bahram, who in turn besieged Theodosiopolis (probably Theodosiopolis in Osroene).

The peace treaty that ended the war (422) was negotiated by the magister officiorum Helio. It returned everything to the situation before the war (status quo ante bellum). Both parts agreed to reject Arab defectors of the other part, as well as to guarantee liberty of religion in their territories. Furthermore, the Romans also agreed to pay the Iranians for the protection of the pass at the Sasanian city of Derbent in the Caucasus. Since the peace treaty of 387, Iran and Rome had agreed that both empires were obligated to cooperate in the defense of the Caucasus against nomadic attacks. While the Romans saw this payment as political subsidies, the Iranians saw it as tribute, which proved that Rome was the deputy of Iran.

=== War with the Kidarites ===
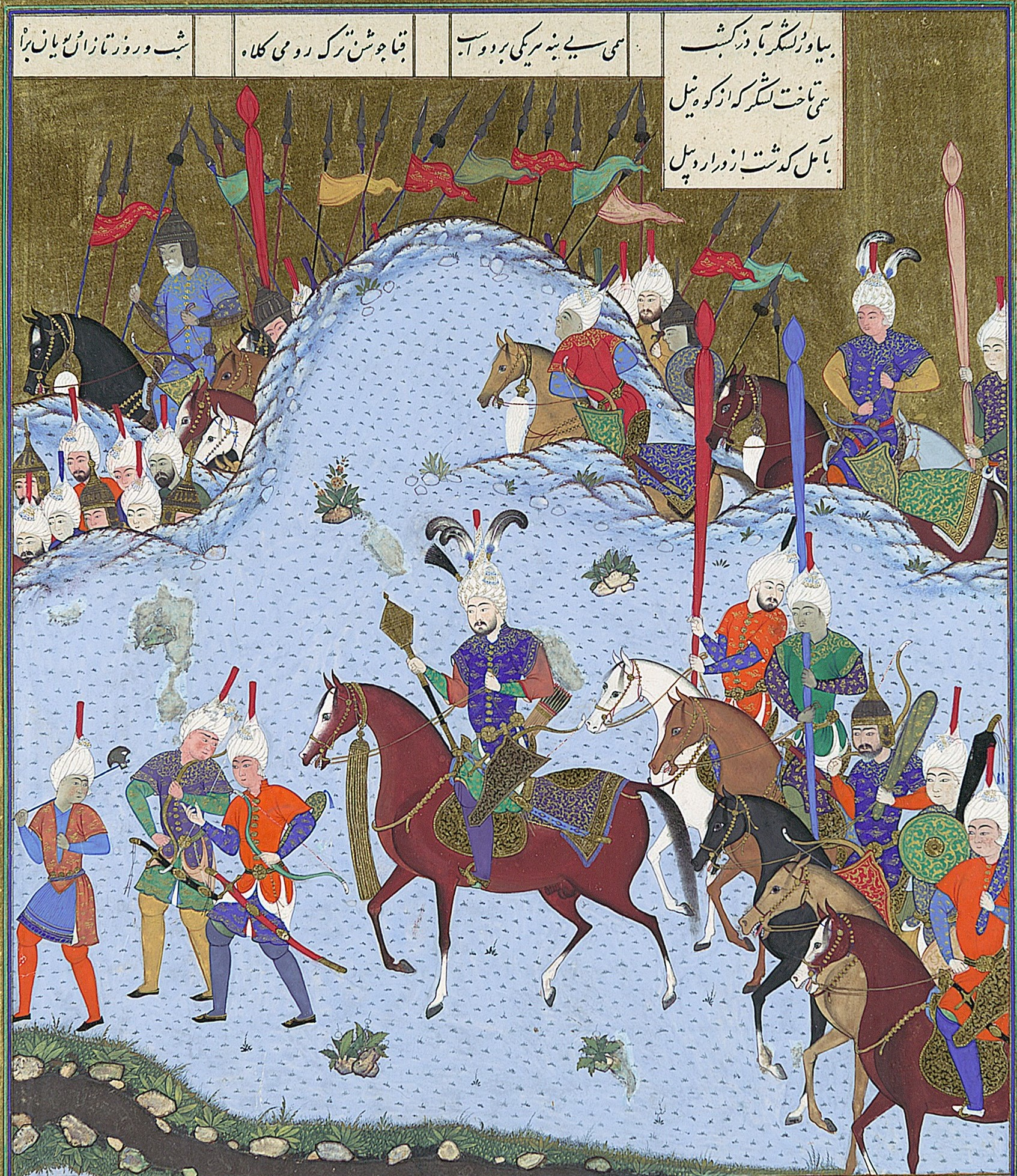
16th-century Shahnameh illustration of Bahram V and his forces on their expedition against the Kidarites

Since the reign of Shapur II, the Iranians had to deal with nomadic invaders in the east known in scholarship as "Iranian Huns" (i.e. the Hephthalites, Kidarites, Chionites and Alchon Huns). Starting with Yazdegerd I, a shift had begun in the political perspective of the Sasanian Empire, which (originally disposed towards the West) moved to the East. The shift may have been triggered by hostile tribes in eastern Iran. The war with the Iranian Huns may have reawakened the mythical rivalry between the mythological Iranian Kayanian rulers and their Turanian enemies, which is illustrated by Younger Avestan texts.

While Bahram was occupied with the war with the Romans, his eastern neighbours—Kidarites (Note: The medieval Iranian historian al-Tabari (d. 923), who reports this event, anachronistically presents them as "Turks". Although some modern historians identify them as Chionites or Hephthalites, they were most likely Kidarites.)—crossed the Oxus river and invaded the Sasanian realm, conquering the rich city of Marw and even reaching as far as westwards as Ray. Bahram was thus forced to pay tribute to the Kidarites, in order to stop their incursions into his empire. When he had made peace with the Romans in 422, he started preparing to deal with the Kidarites. Not only was Marw a rich city, but also an important trading spot on the Silk Road, which passed through Central Asia and continued through Iran to Europe. Bahram first went to the holy temple of Adur Gushnasp in Adurbadagan, where he prayed. He then proceeded to Armenia to recruit additional troops.

Leaving his minister Mihr Narseh as his regent, Bahram passed through the mountain chain on the southern shore of the Caspian Sea, eventually reaching Merv. There his forces routed the Kidarites, killing their king in the process and capturing his wife. A general of Bahram pursued the Kidarites into Transoxiana and inflicted another defeat on them. The war was concluded in 427, with Bahram cementing his name as a great champion of Iran. The name of Bahram was long remembered amongst the people of the surrounding area; the Sogdian city of Bukhara would later mint coins with his image. Bahram erected a pillar at the Oxus, which marked that the river constituted his empire's eastern frontier. (Note: The pillar was later destroyed by his grandson Peroz I.)

In Iranian mythology, the Oxus is often considered the eastern extent of Iran. The heroic archer Arash shot an arrow to the fringe of Khorasan, landing at the Oxus, which thus marked the limit of the Iranian border. Another figure, Esfandiyar, thudded his spear onto the ground at Balkh, warning the Hun king that progressing further would mean an invasion of Iran. Bahram thus believed that he had restored the ancient borders of his realm. He appointed his brother Narseh as the governor of the surrounding region. Bahram also founded (or refounded) the city of Marw-i Rot, near the city of Marw. In order to demonstrate his appreciation to the Zoroastrian supreme god Ahura Mazda, Bahram bestowed most of his booty to Adur Gushnasp.

=== Incorporation of Armenia ===
Map of Sasanian Armenia

Bahram V appointed Artaxias IV as king of Armenia in 422 at the request of the nakharars, reportedly on the term that the Armenian prince called himself the Middle Persian name Ardashir. However, the newly appointed king lacked the character he needed to rule and attain respect amongst his countrymen. As a result, he fell out with the nakharar, who wanted Bahram V to remove Artaxias IV and put it under the direct control of Iran. However, the annexation of Armenia was strongly opposed by the Armenian katholikos Sahak, who felt that the rule of a Christian was better than that of a non-Christian regardless of his character or ability. He hoped that the Roman emperor Theodosius II would help the Armenians after he had sorted out his own issues in his empire.

Regardless, the nakharar did not heed to his words, and contacted Bahram V, chastising both Artaxias V and Sahak for supporting the "Greeks", i.e. the Romans. Sahak went to Ctesiphon to request for support; there the bureaucrats urged Sahak to withdraw his support for Artaxias IV, which he refused. Artaxias IV was ultimately deposed and imprisoned, while Armenia was transformed into a Sasanian frontier province, governed by a marzban ("margrave"). Sahak was also removed from his office, and a Nestorian Syrian named Bar Kiso was appointed in his stead. The Sasanians were cautious in their efforts to respect the nakharars, and only asserted their presence at the Armenian capital of Dvin, which was also the seat of the marzban. Not all of the former territory of the Armenian kingdom was made into a province; the Armenian districts of Parskahayk and Paytakaran were incorporated into the province to its south, Adurbadagan.

== Domestic government ==
At the end of Yazdegerd I's reign, the powerful Parthian House of Suren became powerful associates of the shah and played a key role in the affairs of the empire. This would continue under Bahram, where Suren power reached its zenith. Mihr Narseh served as the wuzurg framadar ("minister") of the shah, while his three sons also occupied high offices; Zurvandad served as the chief herbad of the empire; Mahgushnasp was the wastaryoshan salar ("chief agriculturalist"), which meant that he oversaw the affairs of the land tax; Kardar was the arteshtaran-salar ("chief of the warriors"), a rank, which according to the medieval historian al-Tabari (d. 923), was higher than that of spahbed ("army chief"). The power and influence of the Suren family thus spread over the administrative, financial, and military affairs of the Sasanian Empire. They would continue to enjoy such as high status under Bahram's son and successor Yazdegerd II (r. 438–457) as well.

The influence of Bahram's upbringing in the Arab urban center of al-Hira can be illustrated as follows: "It was to al-Hira that the Persian monarch was sent as a prince, to be educated. Here, he was taught music, among other Arab accomplishments. When he ascended to the throne, one of his first edicts was to improve the status of musicians at the Persian court."

== Coins ==
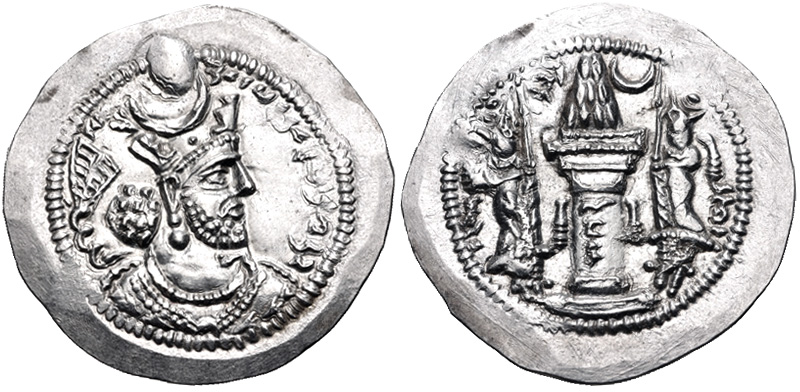
Drachma of Bahram V, Rew-Ardashir mint

Bahram V issued coins in gold, silver, copper and lead. They are (as usual in Sasanian numismatics) identifiable by his special headdress, in this case a mural crown topped with a korymbos resting on a crescent, and a round hairball in the king's neck. The reverse shows the usual fire-altar, watched by two attendants at its sides. A special variant for Bahram V shows the head of the king in the flame upon the altar.

The title of Bahram V on his coins was the typical Mazdēsn bay Warahrān šāhān šāh Ērān ud Anērān kēčihr az yazdān ("the Mazda-worshiping, divine Bahram, King of Kings of Iran(ians) and non-Iran(ians), whose image/brilliance is from the gods"). On some of rare coins minted in Pars, he is also seen with the title of kirbakkar ("beneficent").

== Death and succession ==
Bahram died in 438; his manner of death is shrouded in mystery. According to the Persian poet Ferdowsi (d. 1020), Bahram died in his sleep; according to the poems Haft Peykar and Hasht-Behest, he disappeared in a cave whilst chasing an onager. According to other versions by early historians, Bahram either sunk in a swamp, fell into a deep hole, or drowned. The modern historian Richard Payne calls his death "no less ambiguous than that of his father." Bahram V is remembered as one of the most famous kings in Iranian history, due to his cancellation of taxes and public debt at celebratory events, his encouragement of musicians, and his enjoyment of hunting. He was succeeded by his son Yazdegerd II.

According to the genealogy of the aristocratic Mikalids, the family was descended from Bahram. The Buyid King of Kings Adud al-Dawla (r. 949–983) and the Shirvanshahs (861–1538) likewise claimed ancestry from Bahram. The Bahmanis of Deccan India also claimed descent from Bahram.

== In Persian literature ==
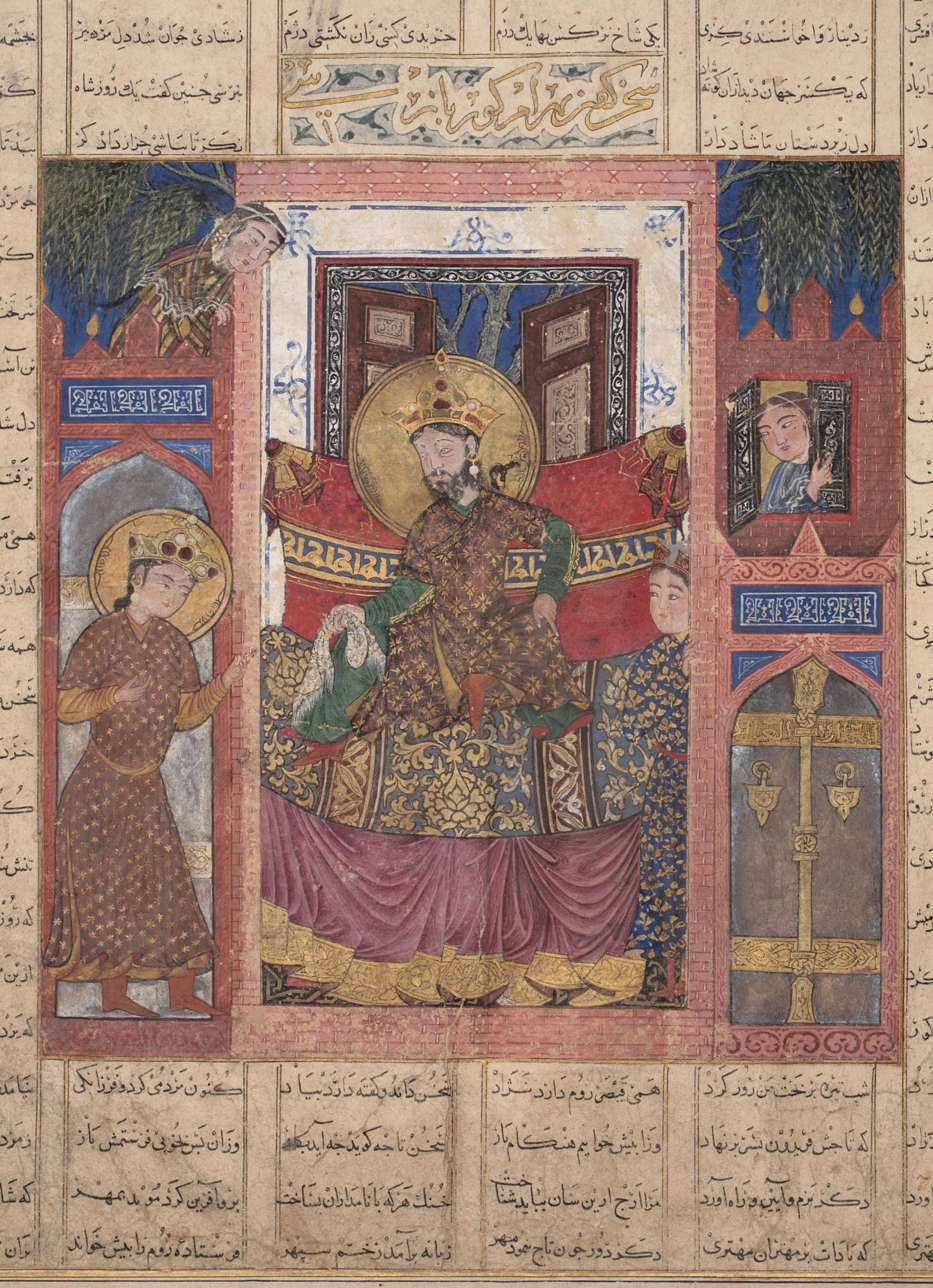
Bahram Gur sends his brother Narsi as Viceroy to Khurasan, from the Great Mongol Shanameh

Bahram is in Islamic-era literature often known by the epithet of Gur/Gōr (Jur in Arabic sources), meaning "onager/wild ass", seemingly due to his fondness of hunting the animal. The onager was the fastest animal in the deserts of Central Asia, even causing difficulties for an experienced rider to catch it. The legend of Bahram "the Wild ass" is based on lost Middle Persian records, such as the Khwaday-Namag ("Book of Lords"). The story of Bahram portrays that of a classic hunter king in Iranian literature, which is associated with the namesake god, known in Avestan as Verethragna. This type of ancient folklore goes back to at least the epic story of ancient Mesopotamian hero Gilgamesh. Later court poets often compared their overlord with ancient figures, such as Rostam or Bahram. In the Tarikh-i Akbari, Arif Qandahari compares the hunting skills of the Mughal emperor Akbar (r. 1556–1605) with that of Bahram. He states that "Akbar emptied the land of wild asses and deer, which brought amazement and joy to the soul of Bahram Gur."

=== Haft Peykar ===
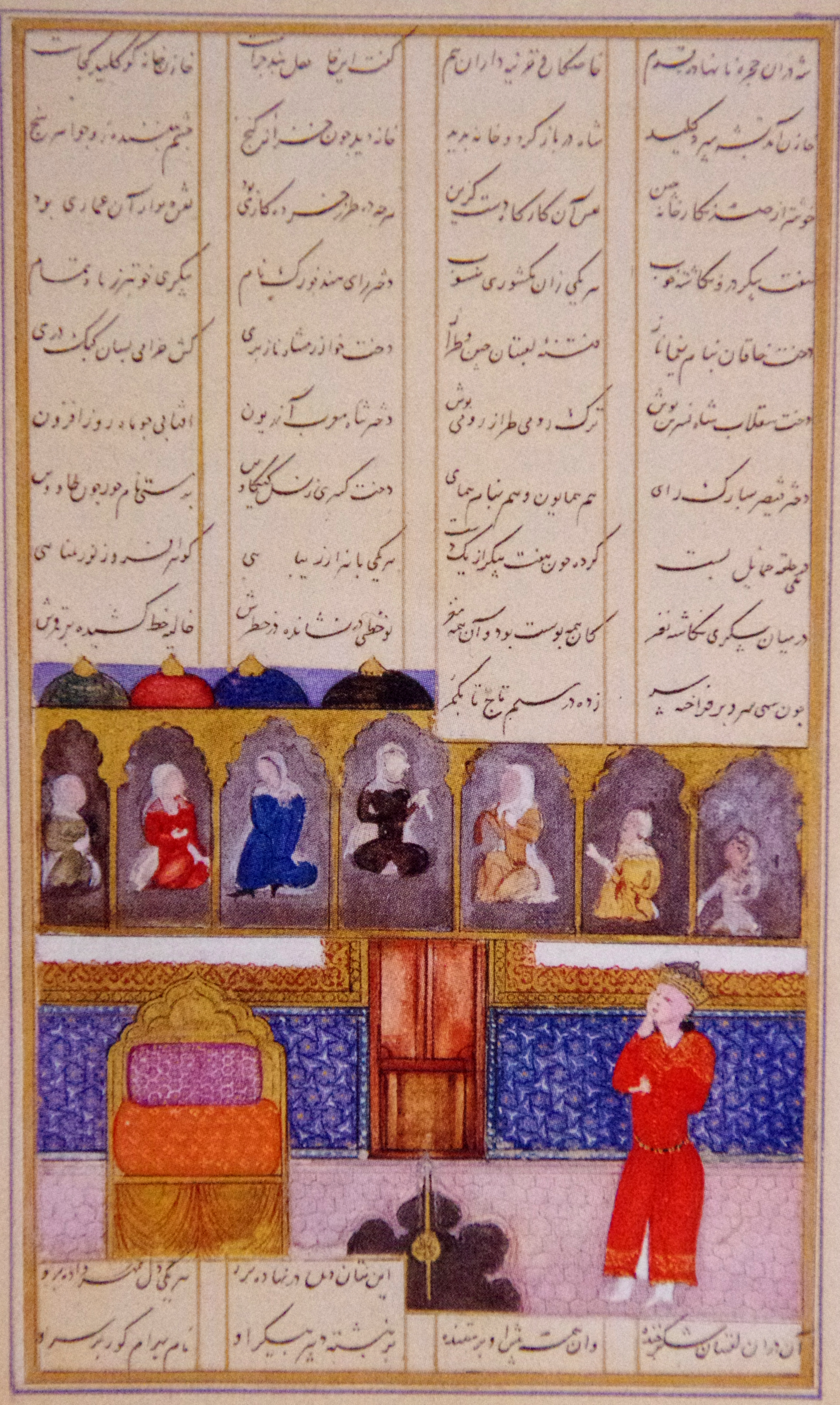
Bahram sees the portraits of the seven beauties. Behzad School, 1479. Nizami Museum of Azerbaijani Literature, Baku.

Haft Peykar (Persian: هفت پیکر) also known as Bahramnameh (بهرام‌نامه, The Book of Bahram) is a famous romantic epic written in 1197 by the Persian poet Nizami Ganjavi. A pre-Islamic story of Persian origin, it was dedicated to the ruler of Maragha, 'Ala' Al-Din korp Arslan. It is a romanticized biography of Bahram, who is born to Yazdegerd I after twenty years of childlessness and supplication to Ahura Mazda for a child. His adventurous life is already mentioned in the Shahnameh ("Book of Kings") of Ferdowsi, which Nizami regularly implies. Nizami primarily overlooks the adventures of Bahram in the Shahnameh, or only mentions them briefly, while focusing on composing new information. He introduces the story by giving a description of the birth of Bahram and his upbringing in the court of the Lakhmid king al-Nu'man and his fabled palace Khawarnaq. Bahram, whose upbringing is entrusted to al-Nu'man, becomes a formidable huntsman.

While wandering through the fabled palace, he discovers a locked room which contains a depiction of seven princesses; hence the name Haft Paykar (seven beauties). Each of these princesses is from the seven different climes (the traditional Zoroastrian division of the Earth) and he falls in love with them. His father Yazdegerd I passes away and Bahram returns to Iran to claim his throne from pretenders. After some episodes he is recognized as shah and rescues the Iranians from a famine. Once the country is stable, the shah searches for the seven princesses and wins them as his brides. His architect is ordered to construct seven domes for each of his new brides. The architect tells him that each of the seven climes is ruled by one of the seven planets (the classical planetary system of the Zoroastrian world) and advises him to assure good fortune by adorning each dome with the color that is associated with each clime and planet. Bahram is skeptical but follows the advice of the architect. Each of the princesses reside in luxurious pavilions. On each visit, the shah visits the princesses on successive days of the week.

Each princess relates to the shah a story matching the mood of her respective color. These seven stories comprise roughly half of the whole poem. While the shah is busy with the seven brides, his evil minister takes over his kingdom. Bahram finds out that his realm is in turmoil, the royal treasury has been depleted and the neighboring kingdoms are posed to invade. He clears his mind first by going hunting. After returning from the hunt, he sees a suspended dog from a tree. The owner of the dog, who was a shepherd, tells the story of how his loyal guard dog had gained sexual favours by a she-wolf in exchange for betraying his flock. He starts investigating the corrupt minister and from the multitude of complaints, he selects seven who tell him the injustice they have suffered. The minister is subsequently put to death and Bahram restores order and orders the seven domes to be converted to Zoroastrian fire temples. Bahram then goes hunting, but in an obscure manner disappears. As a pun on words, while trying to hunt the wild ass (gūr) he instead finds his tomb (gūr).

=== Bahram and Azadeh ===
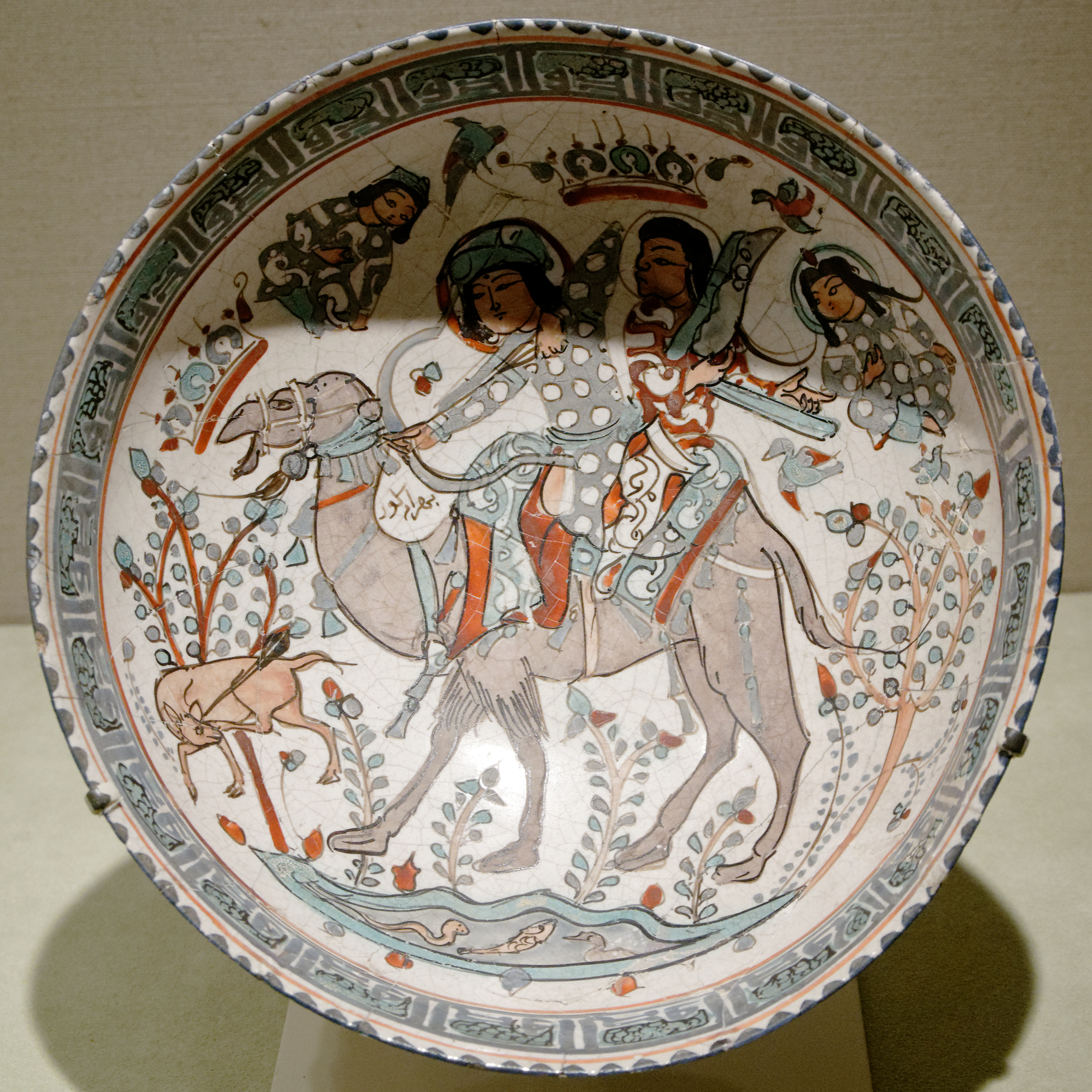
12th–13th century bowl of Bahram and Azadeh

Azadeh (meaning free) was a Roman-slave girl in al-Hira, known for her singing and harpist skills (she played the chang). The young Bahram, during his time at the city, became her owner, and would take her with him whenever he went hunting. During one incident, Bahram bragged to Azadeh about his hunting skills and asked her to choose which gazelle he should shoot. Azadeh replied to him that true skill would be to transform a female gazelle into a male and a male into a female.

Bahram accomplished this by shooting two arrows into the head of a female gazelle, thus giving her "antlers". He then shoot at a male, cutting off his antlers. Azadeh, horrified by this, cried out: "This art of yours is from the daevas [evil deities]". Bahram, enraged, threw her to the ground, and trampled her with his camel. The medieval historian al-Tha'labi (d. 1035/6) reports that al-Mundhir had the incident painted in the Khawarnaq palace at al-Hira. Nizami Ganjavi included the story in his Haft Peykar and had it slightly altered; Bahram orders one of his men to kill Fitna (her new name), but she persuades the officer to spare her and lie to Bahram of her death.

The story is likewise mentioned in an altered version in the Hasht-Behest, where Azadeh's name has been changed to Dilaram (heart's ease). In this version Bahram abandons her after she makes him enraged. After days of walking, she finds a skilled musician, who teaches her his craft. One day, word of a skilled female musician reaches Bahram, which leads him to search for her. Bahram eventually finds Dilaram, and asks for her forgiveness. She accepts, and they return to the Khawarnaq palace.

== Sources ==
- Bosworth, C. E. (1975). "Iran under the Buyids". In Frye, Richard N. (ed.). The Cambridge History of Iran: From the Arab Invasion to the Saljuqs. Vol. 4. Cambridge: Cambridge University Press. ISBN 0-521-20093-8.
- Brend, Dr Barbara Brend (2013). Perspectives on Persian Painting: Illustrations to Amir Khusrau's Khamsah. Routledge. pp. 1–352. ISBN 9781136854118.
- Bulliet, R. W. (1984). "Āl-e Mīkāl". Encyclopaedia Iranica, Vol. I, Fasc. 7. p. 764.
- Christensen, Peter (1993). The Decline of Iranshahr: Irrigation and Environments in the History of the Middle East, 500 B.C. to A.D. 1500. Museum Tusculanum Press. pp. 1–351. ISBN 9788772892597.
- de Blois, François (2002). "Haft Peykar". Encyclopaedia Iranica, Vol. XI, Fasc. 5. pp. 522–524.
- W. L. Hanaway, Jr. (1988). "Bahrām V Gōr in Persian Legend and Literature". Encyclopaedia Iranica, Vol. III, Fasc. 5. pp. 514–522.
- Frye, R. N. (1983). "The political history of Iran under the Sasanians". In Yarshater, Ehsan (ed.). The Cambridge History of Iran: The Seleucid, Parthian and Sasanian Periods. Vol. 3(1). Cambridge: Cambridge University Press. ISBN 0-521-20092-X.
- Daryaee, Touraj; Rezakhani, Khodadad (2016). From Oxus to Euphrates: The World of Late Antique Iran. H&S Media. pp. 1–126. ISBN 9781780835778.
- Daryaee, Touraj (2000). "Mehr-Narseh". Encyclopaedia Iranica.
- Khaleghi-Motlagh, Dj. (1987). "Āzāda". Encyclopaedia Iranica, Vol. III, Fasc. 2. p. 174.
- Martindale, John Robert; Jones, Arnold Hugh Martin; Morris, J., eds. (1980). "Vararanes V Gororanes". The Prosopography of the Later Roman Empire, Volume II: A.D. 395–527. Cambridge, United Kingdom: Cambridge University Press. ISBN 978-0-52-120159-9.
- Melville, Charles; van den Berg, Gabrielle (2012). Shahnama Studies II. Brill. pp. 1–364. ISBN 9789004228634.
- Lukonin, Vladimir; Ivanov, Anatoly (2012). Persian Art. Parkstone International. pp. 1–256. ISBN 9781780428932.
- Traina, Giusto (2011). 428 AD: An Ordinary Year at the End of the Roman Empire. Princeton University Press. pp. 1–232. ISBN 9781400832866.
- Al-Tabari, Abu Ja'far Muhammad ibn Jarir (1985–2007). Ehsan Yar-Shater (ed.). The History of Al-Ṭabarī. Vol. 40 vols. Albany, NY: State University of New York Press.
- Chaumont, M. L. (1986). "Armenia and Iran ii. The pre-Islamic period". Encyclopaedia Iranica, Vol. II, Fasc. 4. pp. 418–438.
- Pourshariati, Parvaneh (2008), Decline and Fall of the Sasanian Empire: The Sasanian-Parthian Confederacy and the Arab Conquest of Iran, London and New York: I.B. Tauris, ISBN 978-1-84511-645-3
- Daryaee, Touraj (2009). Sasanian Persia: The Rise and Fall of an Empire. I.B.Tauris. pp. 1–240. ISBN 978-0857716668.
- Daryaee, Touraj. "Yazdegerd II". Encyclopaedia Iranica.
- Frye, Richard Nelson (1984). The History of Ancient Iran. C.H.Beck. pp. 1-411. ISBN 9783406093975. "The history of ancient iran."
- Greatrex, Geoffrey; Lieu, Samuel N. C. (2002). "Justinian's First Persian War and the Eternal Peace". The Roman Eastern Frontier and the Persian Wars (Part II, 363–630 AD). New York, New York and London, United Kingdom: Routledge. pp. 82–97. ISBN 0-415-14687-9.
- Kia, Mehrdad (2016). The Persian Empire: A Historical Encyclopedia [2 volumes]: A Historical Encyclopedia. ABC-CLIO. ISBN 978-1610693912.
- Howard-Johnston, James Howard-Johnston (2012). "Late Sasanian army". The Gibb Memorial Trust. London: 87–127.
- Multiple authors (1988). "Bahrām". Encyclopaedia Iranica, Vol. III, Fasc. 5. pp. 514–522.
- Klíma, O. (1988). "Bahrām V Gōr". Encyclopaedia Iranica, Vol. III, Fasc. 5. London et al. pp. 514–522.
- Schindel, Nikolaus (2013). "Sasanian Coinage". In Potts, Daniel T. (ed.). The Oxford Handbook of Ancient Iran. Oxford University Press. ISBN 978-0199733309.
- Shahinyan, Arsen (2016). "Northern Territories of the Sasanian Atropatene and the Arab Azerbaijan". Iran and the Caucasus. 20 (2): 191–203. doi:10.1163/1573384X-20160203.
- Shayegan, M. Rahim (2013). "Sasanian Political Ideology". In Potts, Daniel T. (ed.). The Oxford Handbook of Ancient Iran. Oxford University Press. ISBN 978-0199733309.
- Toumanoff, Cyril (1961). "Introduction to Christian Caucasian History: II: States and Dynasties of the Formative Period". Traditio. 17. Cambridge University Press: 1–106. doi:10.1017/S0362152900008473. JSTOR 27830424. S2CID 151524770. (registration required)
- Rapp, Stephen H. (2014). The Sasanian World through Georgian Eyes: Caucasia and the Iranian Commonwealth in Late Antique Georgian Literature. Ashgate Publishing, Ltd. ISBN 978-1472425522.
- Rezakhani, Khodadad (2017). ReOrienting the Sasanians: East Iran in Late Antiquity. Edinburgh University Press. pp. 1–256. ISBN 9781474400305.
- Russell, James R. (1987). Zoroastrianism in Armenia. Harvard University Press. ISBN 978-0674968509.
- Wiesehöfer, Josef (2018). "Bahram I". In Nicholson, Oliver (ed.). The Oxford Dictionary of Late Antiquity. Oxford: Oxford University Press. ISBN 978-0-19-866277-8.
- Payne, Richard (2015). "The Reinvention of Iran: The Sasanian Empire and the Huns". In Maas, Michael (ed.). The Cambridge Companion to the Age of Attila. Cambridge University Press. pp. 282–299. ISBN 978-1-107-63388-9.
- Potts, Daniel T. (2018). "Sasanian Iran and its northeastern frontier". In Mass, Michael; Di Cosmo, Nicola (eds.). Empires and Exchanges in Eurasian Late Antiquity. Cambridge University Press. pp. 1–538. ISBN 9781316146040.
- André Wink (2002). Al-Hind, The Making of the Indo-Islamic world, Vol. 1 - Early Medieval India and the expansion of Islam, 7th-11th centuries. BRILL. ISBN 0391041738.

Bahram V Sasanian dynasty Born: 400 Died: 438
Preceded by Khosrow	King of Kings of Iran and non-Iran; 420–438	Succeeded by Yazdegerd II
