= Hasht Bihisht =

Collection of speeches authored by Amir Khusraw

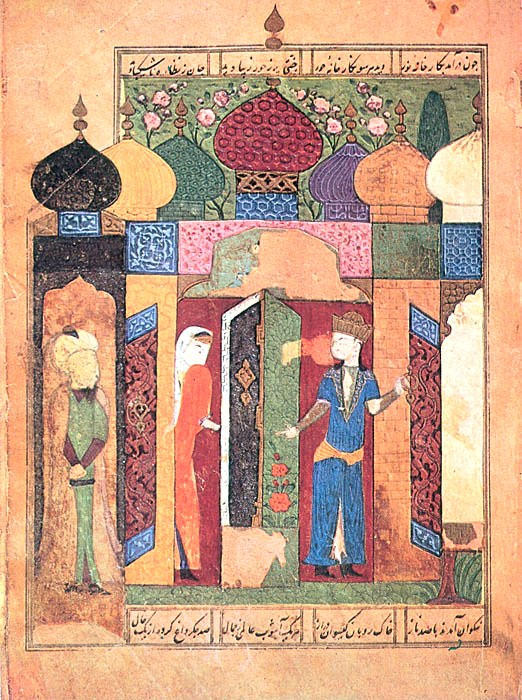
The seven pavilions

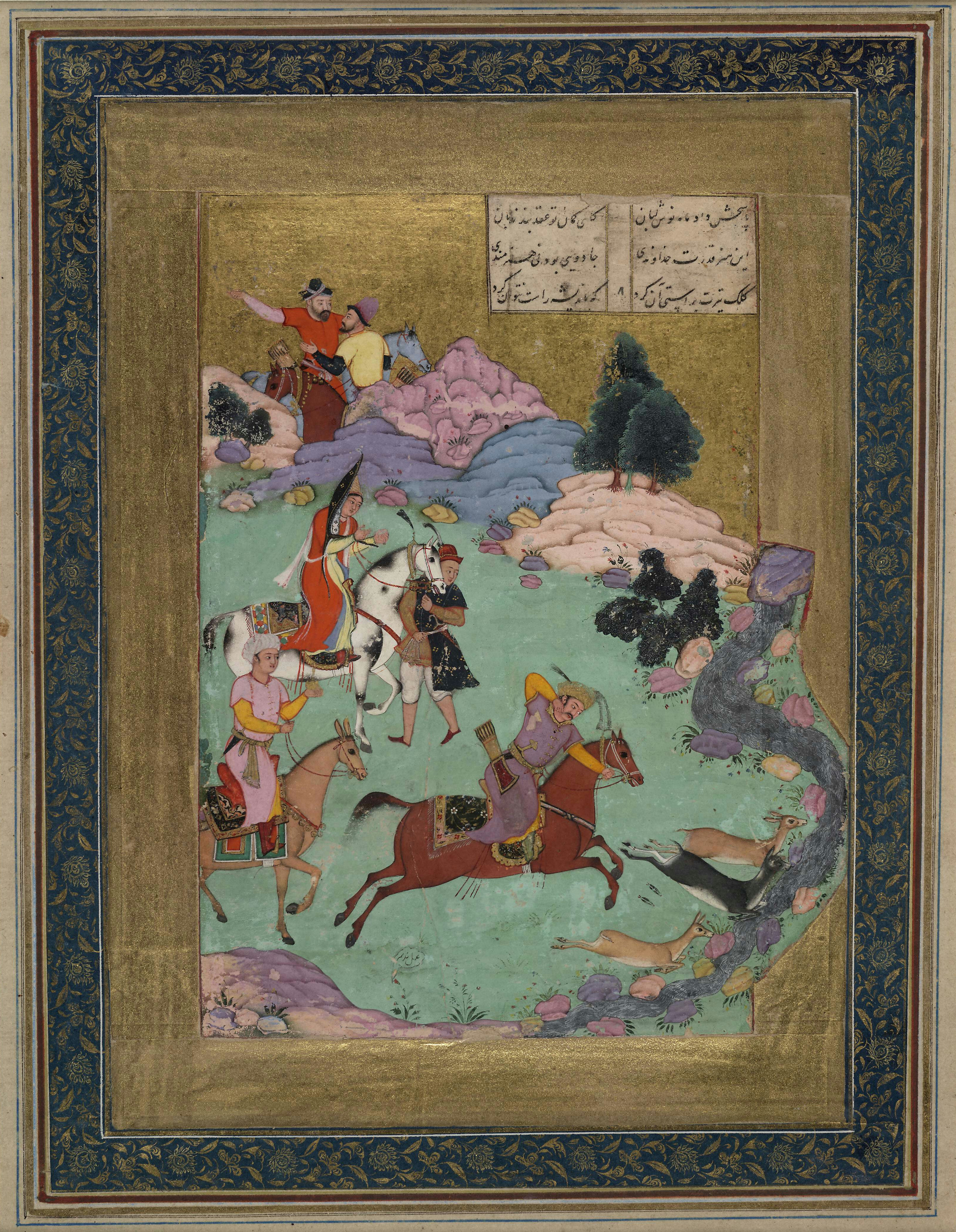
Bahram Gur hunting three doe

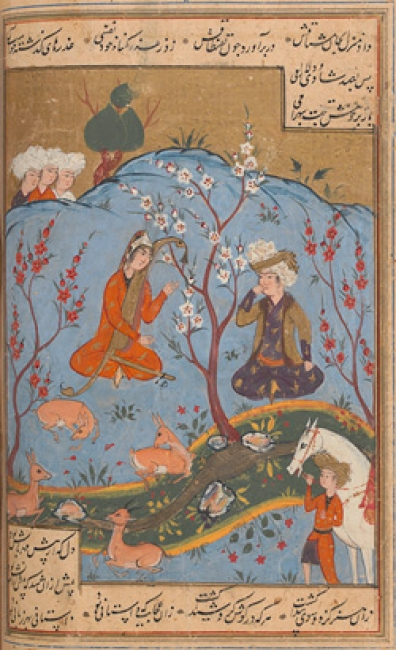
Bahram Gur listens as Dilaram enchants the animals

Hasht Bihisht (Persian: هشت بهشت, lit. 'Eight Paradises') is a collection of speeches (or narrative poems) authored by the Indo-Persian poet Amir Khusraw around 1302. Written in Persian, it forms the final poem in Khusraw’s Khamsah (quintet) and is modeled on Nizami Ganjavi’s Haft Paykar (c. 1197), which itself draws inspiration from Firdausi’s Shahnameh (c. 1010). Like Nizami's Haft Paykar, Khusraw's Hasht Bihisht uses a legend about Bahram V Gur as its frame story and, in the style of One Thousand and One Nights, introduces folktales told by seven princesses. Most famously, Khusraw appears to be the first writer to have added The Three Princes of Serendip, including the well-known episode involving the detection of a camel’s features through inference.

The eight "paradises" in the poem link closely with the Islamic conception of Heaven with its eight gates and eight spaces, each one decorated with a special precious stone or material. Seven of the eight paradises are pavilions constructed for Bahram's "therapy" of storytelling. There is also a link to the architectural and garden plan of eight paradises. These serve as the backdrop for Bahram’s metaphorical transformation from a pleasure-seeking ruler to a wise sovereign.

A deluxe illustrated manuscript of Khamsah-i Dihlavī, including Hasht Bihisht, was produced in Lahore during the reign of Mughal emperor Akbar (r. 1556–1605) by the celebrated calligrapher Muḥammad Ḥusayn al-Kashmīrī, known as Zarrīn Qalam. The manuscript (W.624), now held by the Walters Art Museum in Baltimore, Maryland, features elaborate miniatures by prominent painters of the Mughal atelier and is considered a significant example of Persianate literary and artistic tradition under imperial patronage.

== The narrative ==
The narrative commences with the story of Bahram and Dilaram.

Later, Bahram has seven differently-coloured domed pavilions built for him within his palace grounds, in which wait seven princesses from various parts of the world. Bahram Gur visits each on a different day of the week and each of them tells him a story:

- Saturday – the Black Pavilion – the Indian Princess (The Tale of the Three Princes of Serendip)
- Sunday – the Yellow Pavilion – the Princess of Nimruz
- Monday – the Green Pavilion – the Slav Princess
- Tuesday – the Red Pavilion – the Tatar Princess
- Wednesday – the Violet Pavilion – the Princess of Rum
- Thursday – the Brown Pavilion – the Arabian Princess
- Friday – the White Pavilion – the Princess of Khwarezm

== Manuscripts ==
The Hasht Bihisht, and indeed the whole of the Khamsah, was a popular work in the centuries after Khusraw's death, not only in India, but in Iran and the Ottoman Empire, and as such was illustrated nearly as frequently as Nizami's Khamsah from the early fifteenth century on.

== Translations ==
- The Hasht Bihisht has never been translated entirely into any language except Russian and Italian. Verse translations of two stories (Tuesday and Friday) by Sunil Sharma have been published.
- Lal and Prasada provide a partial direct-to-English translation and commentary of Saturday's tale which introduces The Three Princes of Serendip.

=== Walters Art Museum manuscript W.623 ===
An illustrated and illuminated manuscript of the poem was part of a Khamsah from 1609 CE produced in Safavid Iran. All texts are written in black nastaʿlīq script with chapter headings in red.

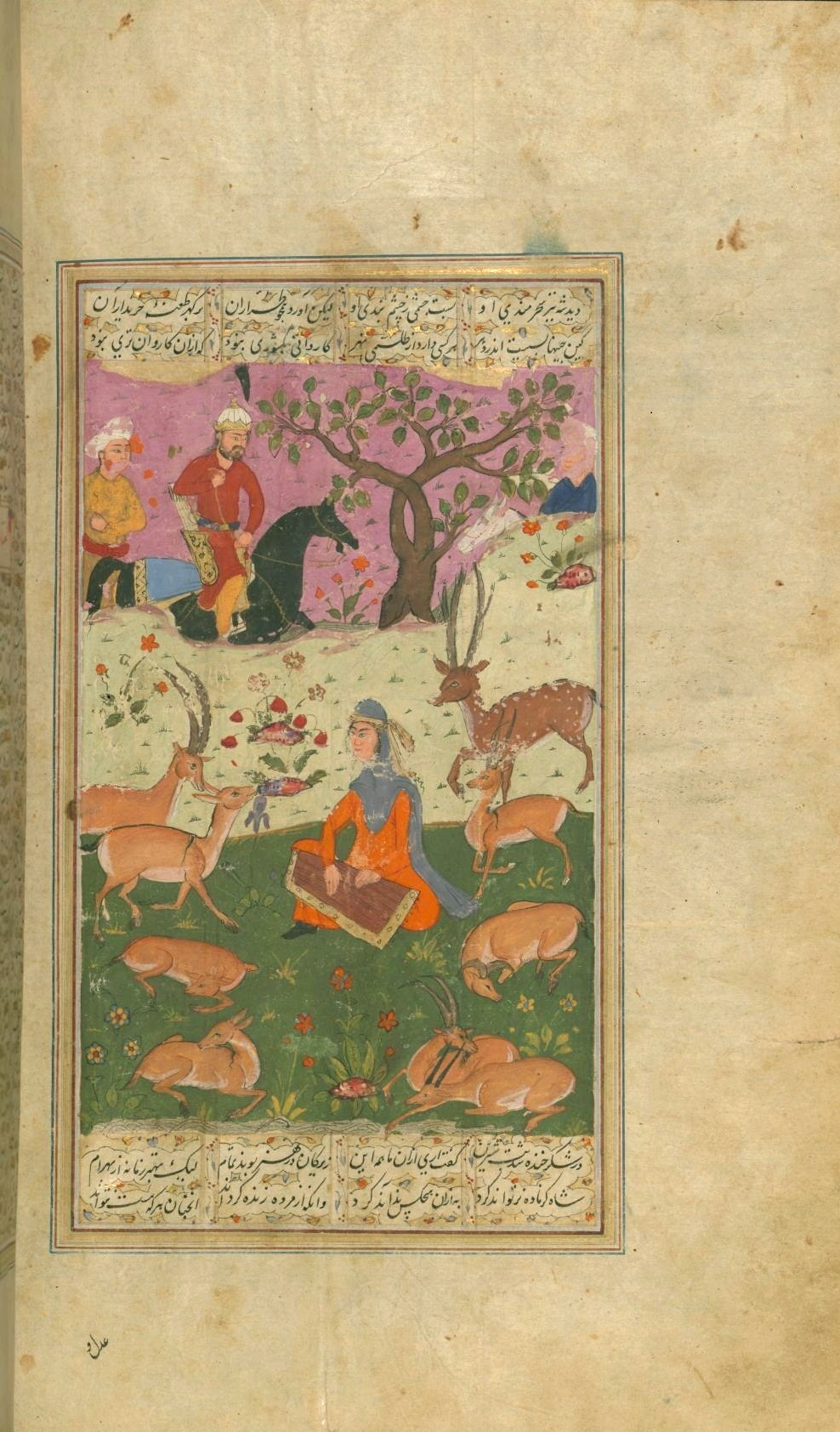
Bahram Gur recognizes Dilaram by the music with which she enchants the animals

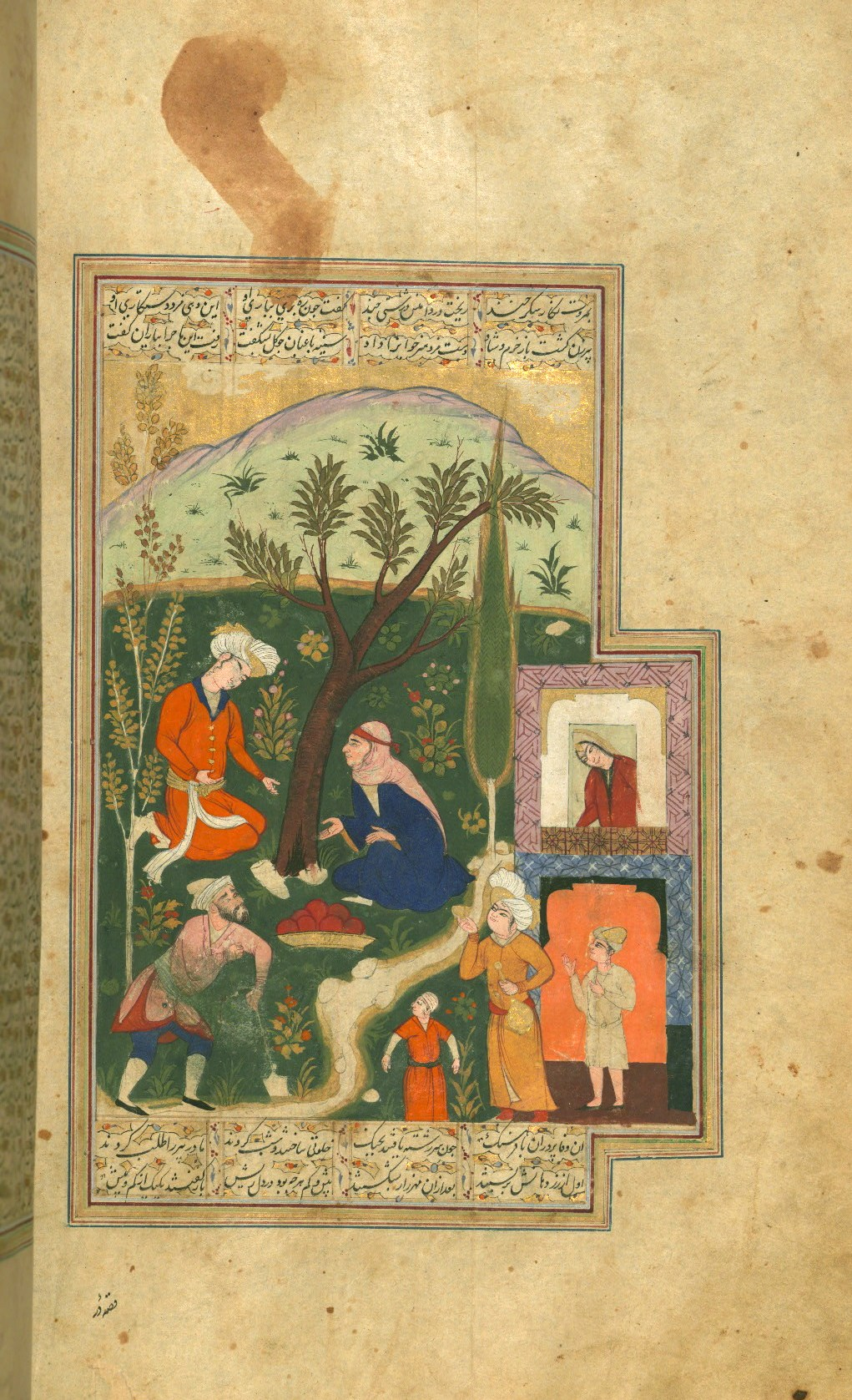
Bahram Gur in the red pavilion

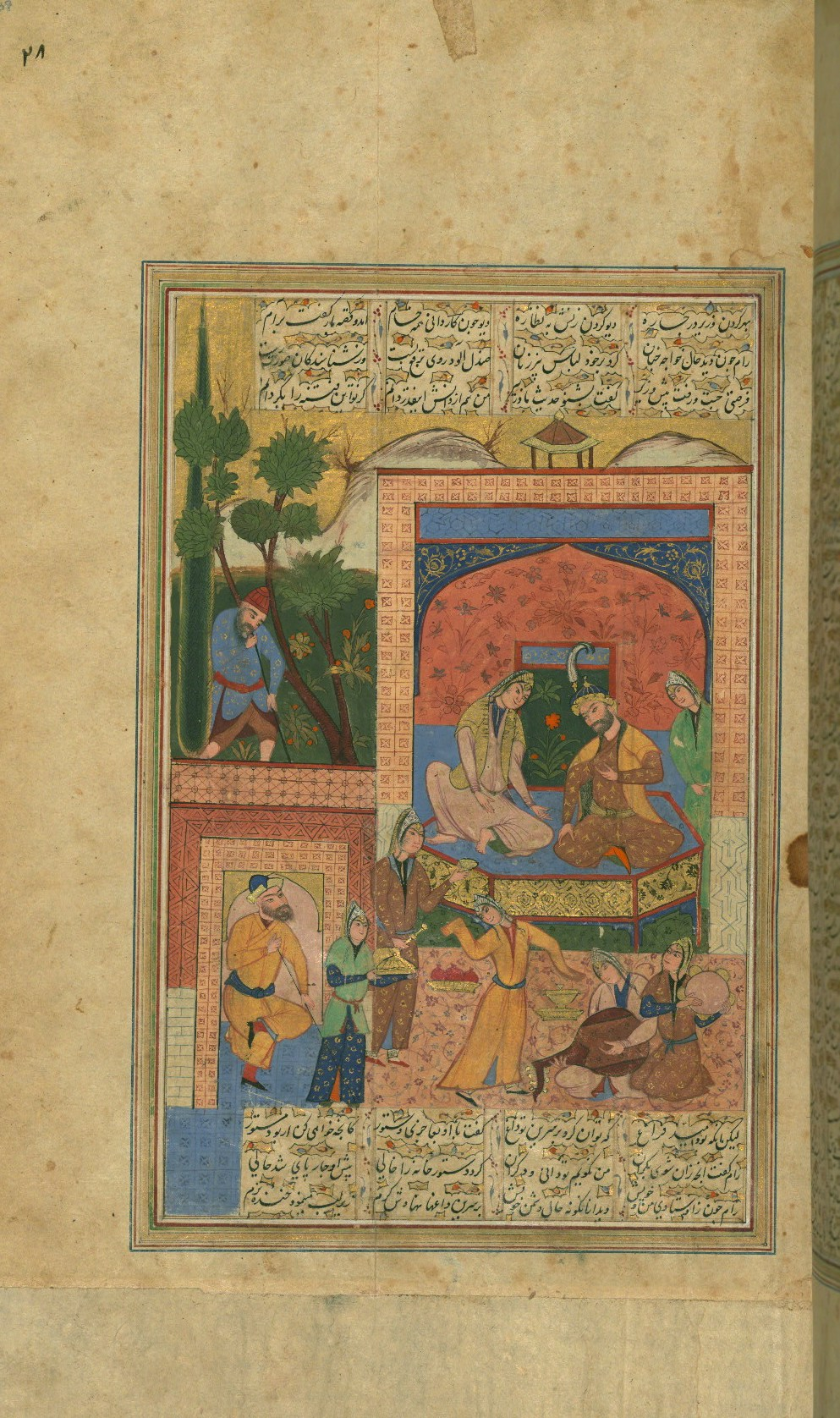
Bahram Gur in the brown pavilion

=== Walters Art Museum manuscript W.624 ===
The poem was illustrated in a manuscript probably produced in Lahore in the late sixteenth CE which is associated with the patronage of Akbar (r. 1556 – 1605 CE).

The manuscript was written in nasta'liq script by one of the greatest calligraphers of the Mughal atelier, Muhammad Husayn al-Kashmiri, honoured with the epithet Zarrin Qalam (golden pen). The manuscript has the names of a number of painters: Lal, Manuhar, Sanwalah, Farrukh, Aliquli, Dharamdas, Narsing, Jagannath, Miskina, Mukund, and Surdas Gujarati. The illuminators are Husayn Naqqash, Mansur Naqqash, Khvajah Jan Shirazi, and Lutf Allah Muzahhib

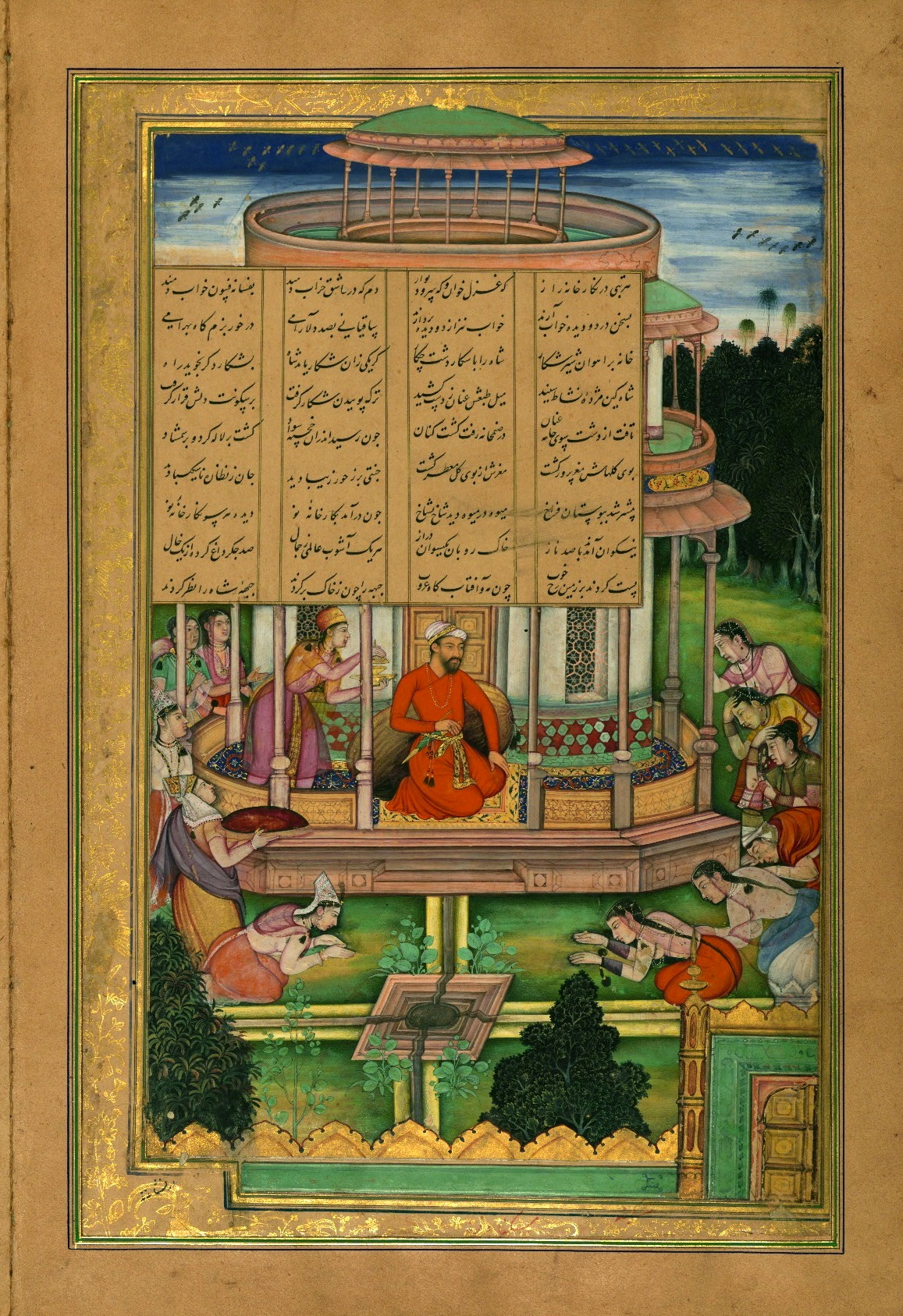
The princesses of the seven pavilions bow in homage to Bahram Gur.

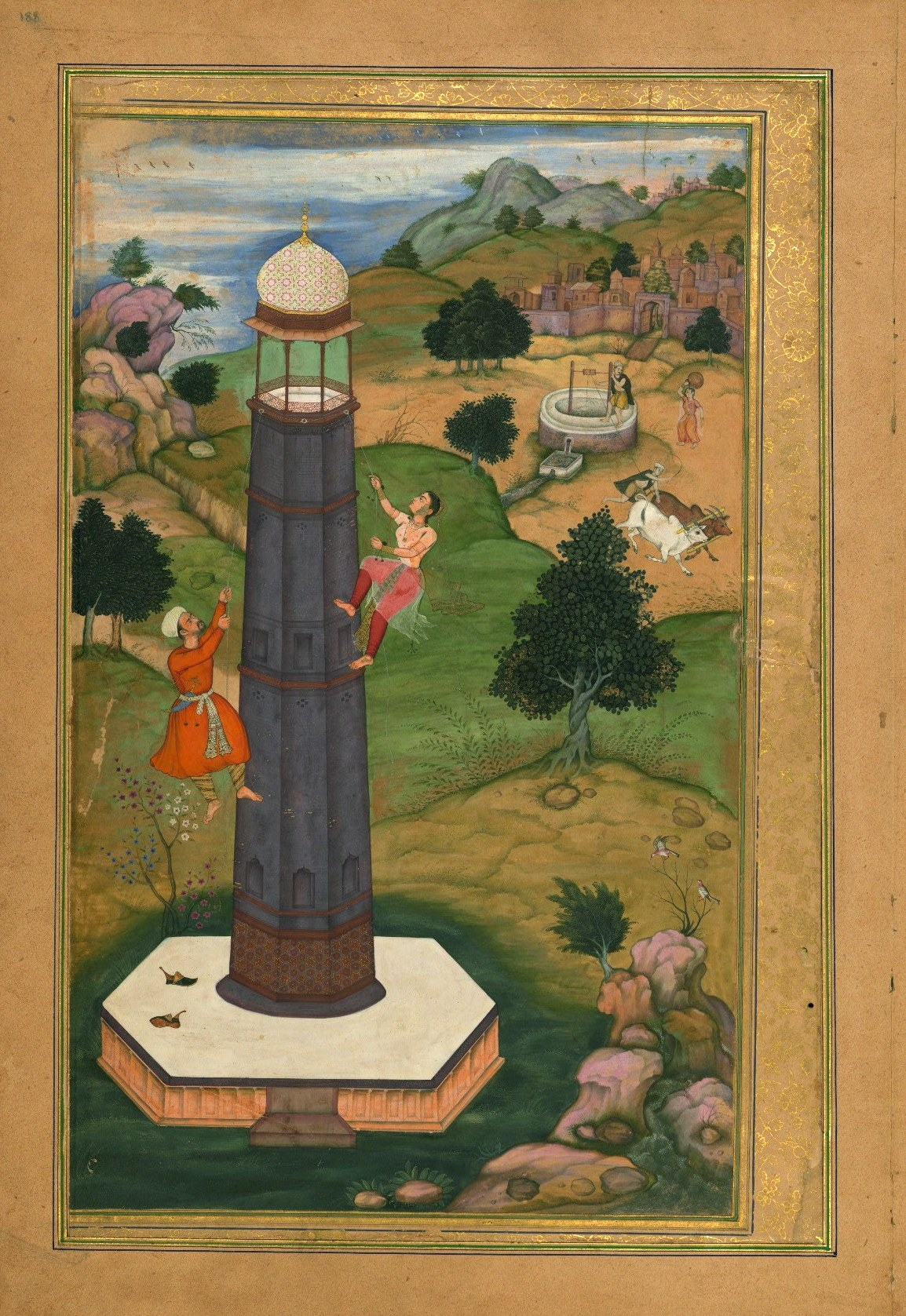
The tale told by the princess of the Yellow Pavilion. Hassan the goldsmith descending from imprisonment in a tower, as his wife goes up to imprisonment.

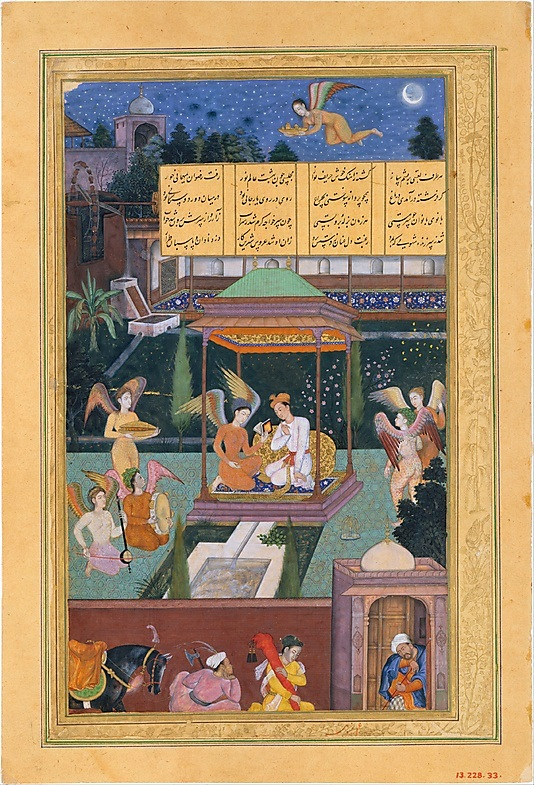
The Story of the Princess of the Blue Pavilion, Metropolitan Museum of Art

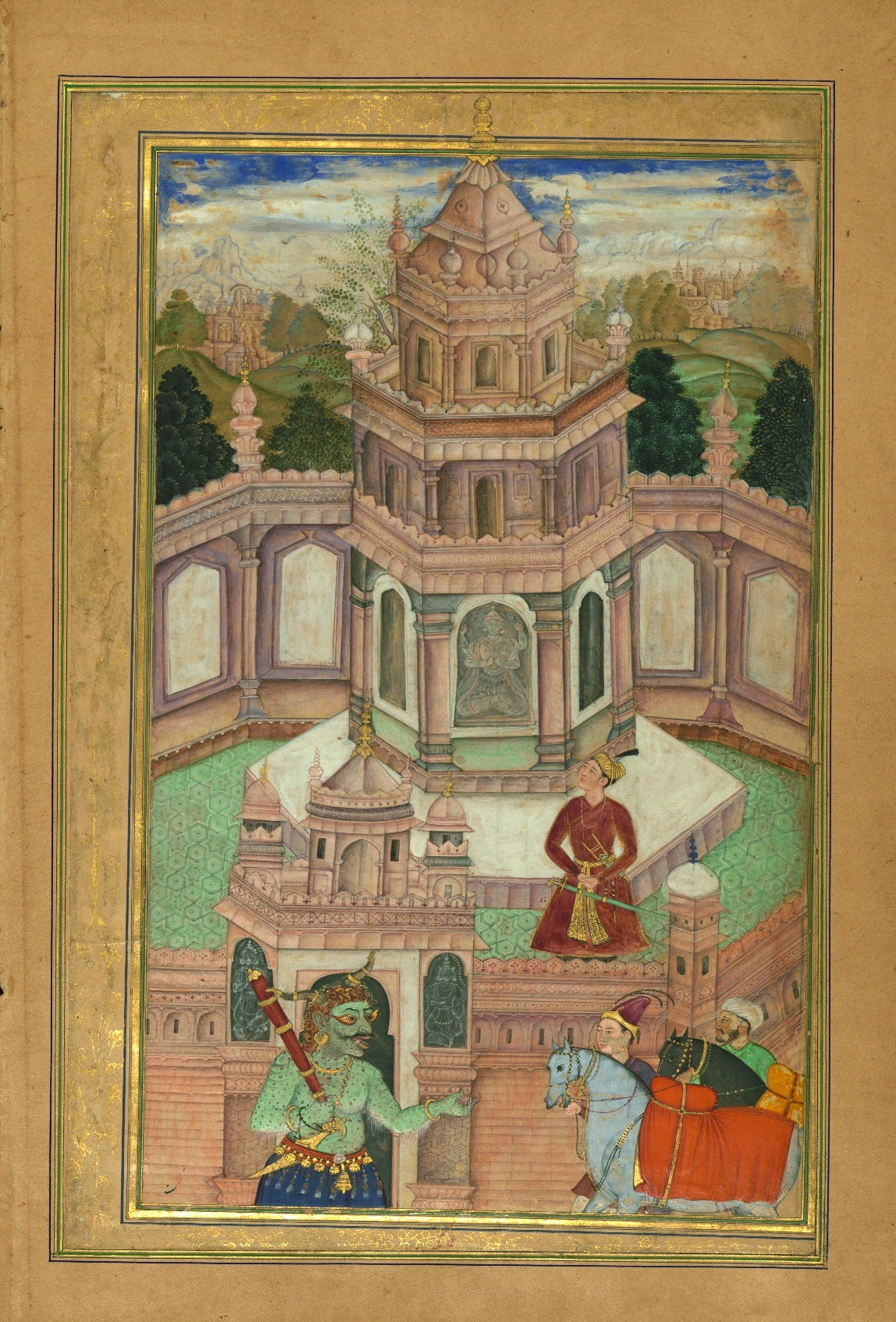
Bahram Gur visiting the Princess of Arabia in the Brown Pavilion

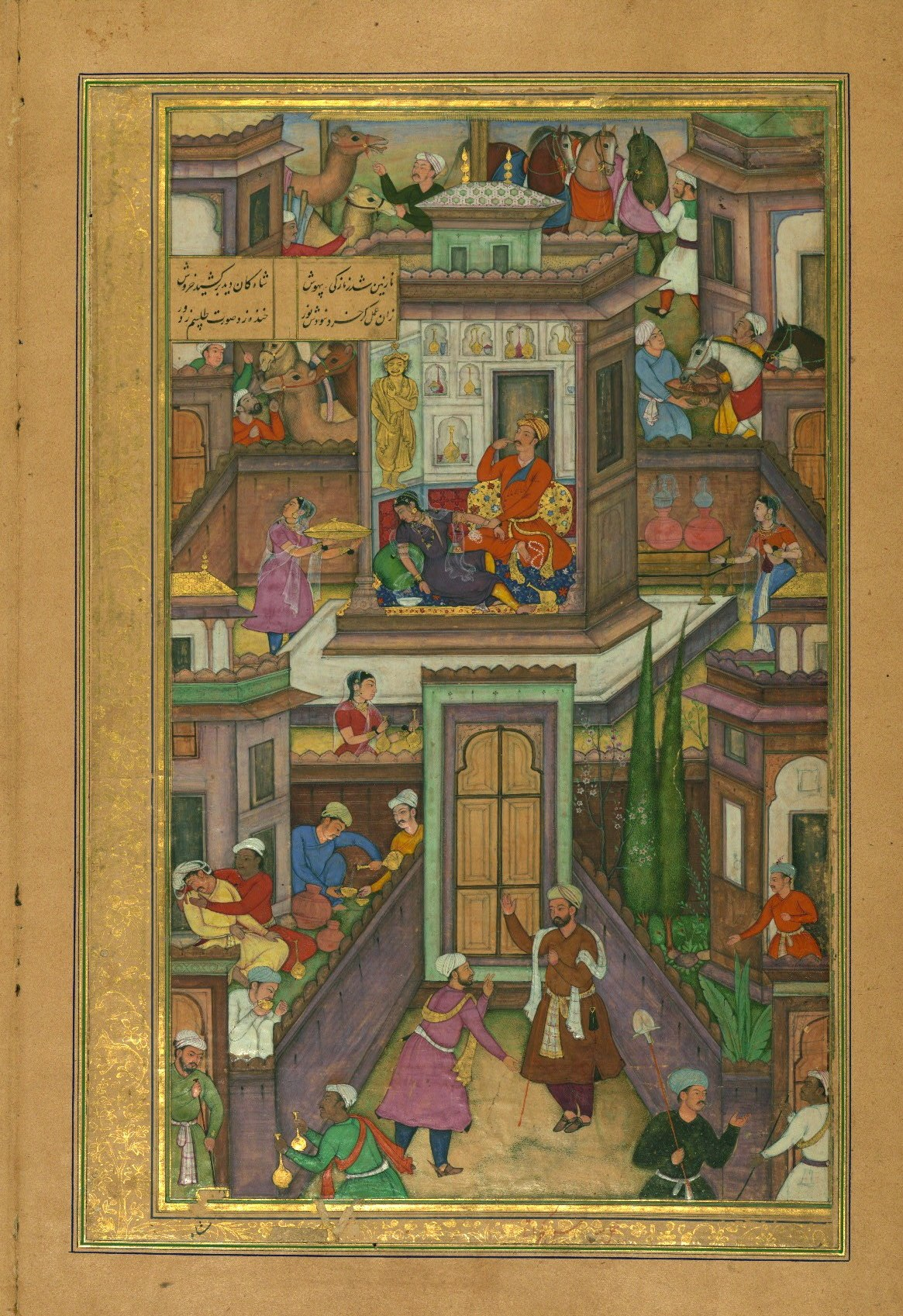
The story of the Princess of Khwarezm in the White Pavilion.
