= Haft Peykar =

1197 Persian epic by Nezami Ganjavi

- by Nizami Ganjavi
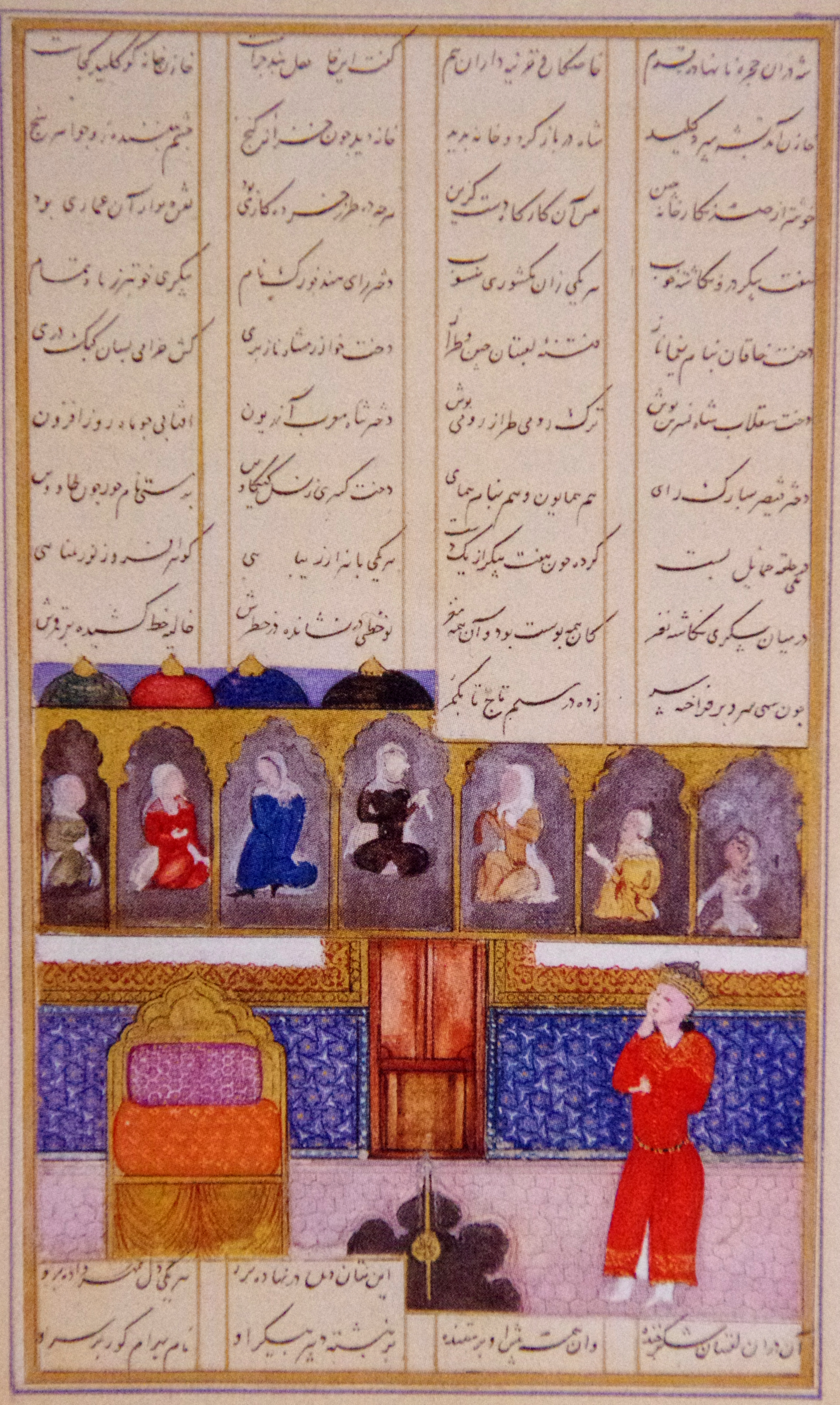
- Bahram sees the portraits of the seven beauties. Behzad School, 1479. Nizami Museum of Azerbaijani Literature, Baku
- Language: Persian

Haft Peykar (Persian: هفت پیکر), (Note: Classical reading: Haft Paykar) also known as Bahramnameh (بهرام‌نامه, (Note: Classical reading: Bahramnāma) The Book of Bahram, referring to the Sasanian emperor Bahram V), is a romantic epic poem by Persian poet Nizami Ganjavi, written in 1197. This poem is one of his five works known collectively as Khamsa ("Quintet").

The title Haft Peykar can be translated literally as "Seven Portraits", with the figurative meaning "Seven Beauties". Both translations are meaningful, and the poet probably made use of this ambiguity intentionally. The poem was dedicated to the Ahmadili ruler of Maragheh, Ala-al-Din Korpe Arslan bin Aq-Sonqor. Iranologist François de Blois writes, "Nezami’s Haft peykar is a masterpiece of erotic literature, but it is also a profoundly moralistic work."

Around the time Haft Peykar was written, there were various styles in which Persian lyric poetry was presented and written. The style found in Haft Peykar is that of epic literature, where characters change moods and express complex feelings in heroic tales. In this case, the poem's protagonist is searching for some sort of spiritual resolution.

== Date ==
Haft Peykar is likely the latest of Nizami's five works known collectively as Khamsa (Quintet), although in most manuscripts it comes after Iskandarnameh. According to Iranologist François de Blois, the work was probably completed in August 1197.

== Story ==
Haft Peykar is the story of King Bahram Gur, known for his hunting ability and seven wives. The Haft Peykar consists of seven tales. Bahram sends for seven princesses as his brides, and builds a palace containing seven domes for his brides, each dedicated to one day of the week, governed by the day's planet and bearing its emblematic color. Bahram visits each dome in turn, where he feasts, drinks, enjoys the favors of his brides, and listens to a tale told by each. And not only does each bride represent a color and a story, but a deeper meaning. They each have a region, climes of the world, but also virtues and religious significance. It was even thought that the colors of the brides were stages of love in the Sufi traditions. These stages go from the impurity of black to the purity of white. One of the most widely discussed messages from the poem is the distinction between sacred and profane love. It is believed the Haft Peykar teaches about pure love through the dichotomy of needing versus giving.

| Day | Planet | Color of the dome | Land of the princess | Name | Story |
|---|---|---|---|---|---|
| Saturday | Saturn | Black | India | Furak | The Unfulfilled Love |
| Sunday | Sun | Yellow | Turkestan | Yaghma Naz | The King who did not want to marry |
| Monday | Moon | Green | Khwarazm | Naz Pari | The Lovesick Bishr |
| Tuesday | Mars | Red | Saqaliba | Nasrin-Nush | Turandot's Riddles |
| Wednesday | Mercury | Turquoise | Maghreb | Azarbin (Azar-Gun) | Mahan and the Madman |
| Thursday | Jupiter | Sandal | Rûm | Humay | Good and Evil |
| Friday | Venus | White | Iran | Diroste | Tribulations of the Lovers |

== Editions and translations ==
A critical edition of the Haft Peykar was produced by Hellmut Ritter and Jan Rypka (Prague, printed Istanbul, 1934) on the basis of fifteen manuscripts of Khamsa and the Bombay lithograph. There is also an uncritical edition by Wahid Dastgerdi (Tehran, 1936 and reprints) and an edition by Barat Zanjani (Tehran, 1994). More recently, the poem was re-edited by the Azerbaijani scholar T. A. Maharramov (Moscow, 1987).

A poetic German translation of a passage from the poem named Bahram Gur and Russian princess by orientalist Franz Erdmann was published in 1832 in Kazan.

There are three complete translations in western European languages from the original Persian language. First, in 1924 Charles Edward Wilson translated the poem to English in two volumes with extensive notes. Wilson's translation was a literal translation and contained certain errors and omissions. Second, Alessandro Bausani in 1967 translated it into Italian. Finally, there is an English version by Julie Scott Meisami, published in 1967. This translation was a rhymed version that included explanations to help the readers understand the more hidden and allusive meanings of the text. This English translation was very popular. A partial translation was also made by Rudolf Gelpke in German prose (Zurich, 1959), which was later rendered into English by E. Mattin and G. Hill (Oxford, 1976). There is a complete poetic translation in Azerbaijani by Məmməd Rahim (Baku, 1946). There are three complete translations in Russian: a poetic translation by Ryurik Ivnev (Baku, 1947), a poetic translation by Vladimir Derzhavin (Moscow, 1959), and a prose translation by Rustam Aliyev (Baku, 1983).

== Cultural influence ==
The story of the Seven Beauties presented an allegorical story with a religious significance. Religious symbolism in paintings or illustrations was not widely accepted. At the time, it was common for manuscripts to not be outwardly religious because there was no official religious iconography adopted in Islam, so it is believed Nizami hid the moral and divine messaging in a narrative. This may be thought of as a way that the poem and its illustrations changed the reading of manuscripts.

In the early 1940s, to mark the 800th anniversary of Nizami Ganjavi, Azerbaijani composer Uzeyir Hajibeyov planned to write seven songs for the seven beauties of the poem. However, he only wrote two songs: "Sensiz" ("Without You", 1941) and "Sevgili Janan" ("Beloved", 1943).

In 1952 Azerbaijani composer Gara Garayev composed the ballet Seven Beauties based on motifs of Nizami Ganjavi's Haft Peykar.

In 1959, a fountain with a bronze sculpture "Bahram Gur" depicting the hero of the poem killing a serpentine dragon at his feet was erected in Baku. This statue references the ancient Iranian narrative of the deity Bahram slaying the evil serpent.

In 1979 the Nizami Gəncəvi subway station in Baku was decorated by Azerbaijani painter Mikayil Abdullayev with mosaic murals based on the works of Nizami. Three of these murals depict heroes of the Seven Beauties poem.

The opera Turandot by Giacomo Puccini is based on the story of Tuesday, being told to King Bahram by his companion of the red dome, associated with Mars.

== Gallery ==
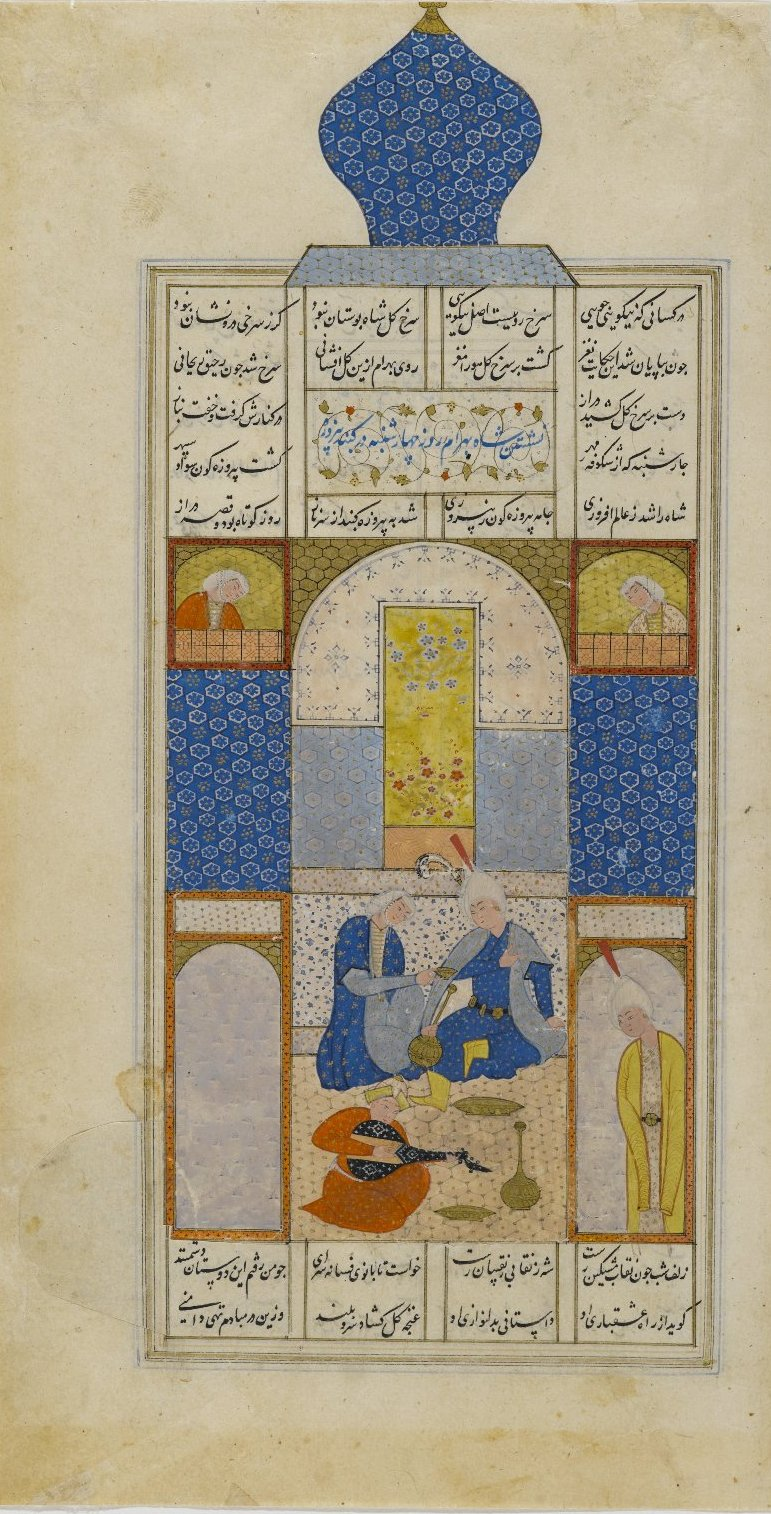
Bahram Gur Visits the Dome of Piruza on Wednesday. Page from an illustrated manuscript of Nizami's Haft Peykar. Brooklyn Museum.

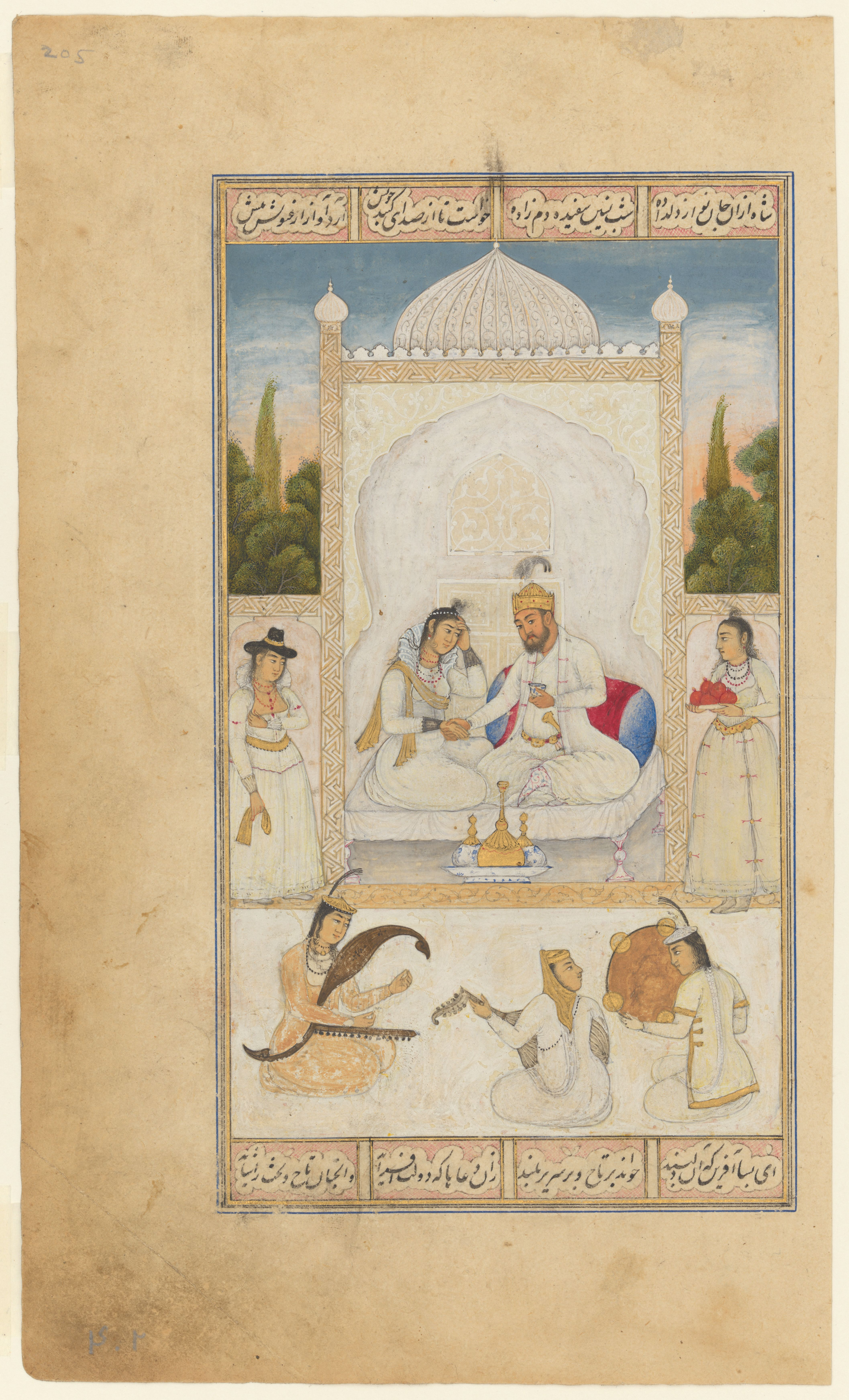
King Bahram Gur with the Iranian princess in her white pavilion.

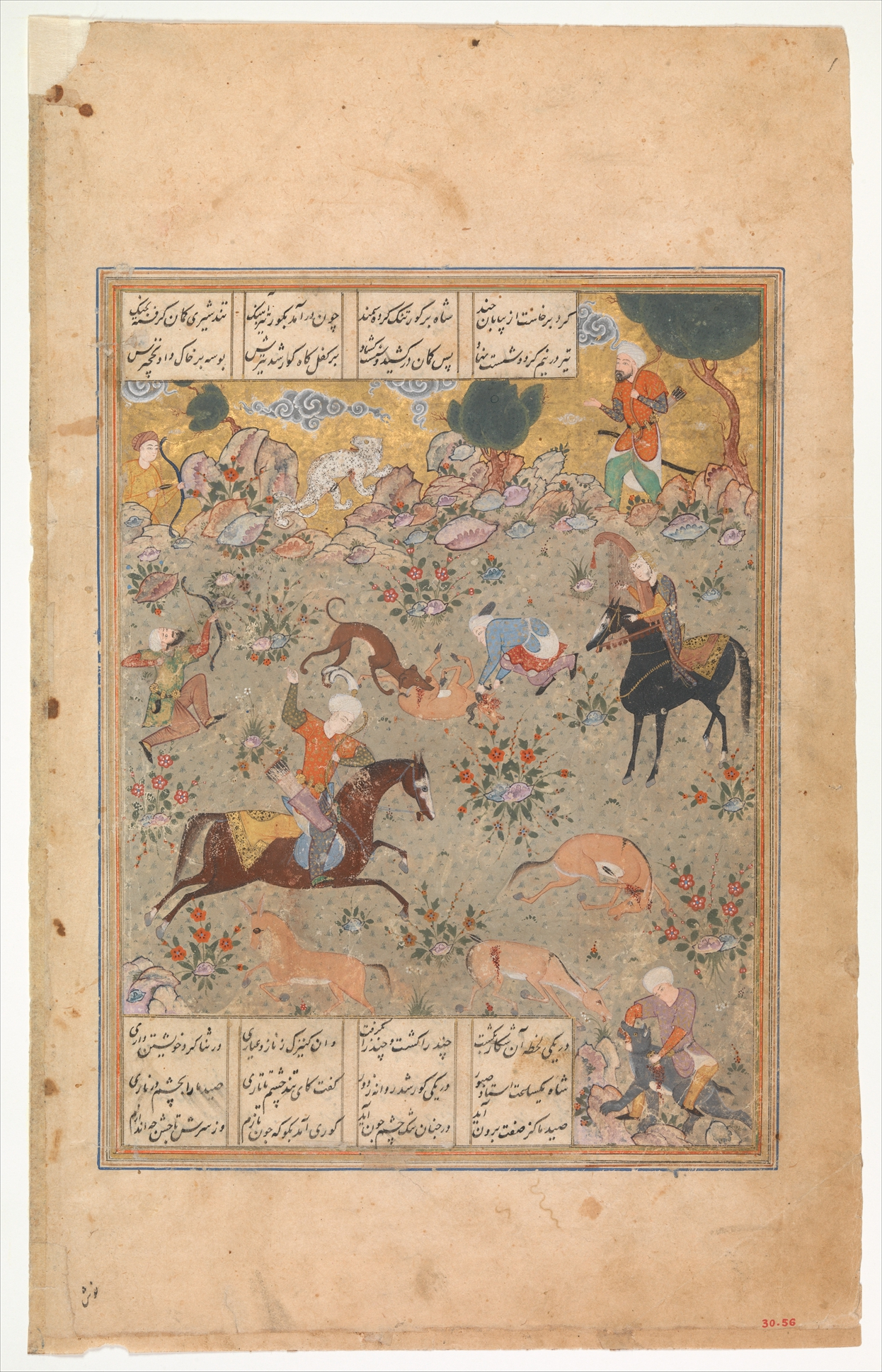
King Bahram Gur is hunting.

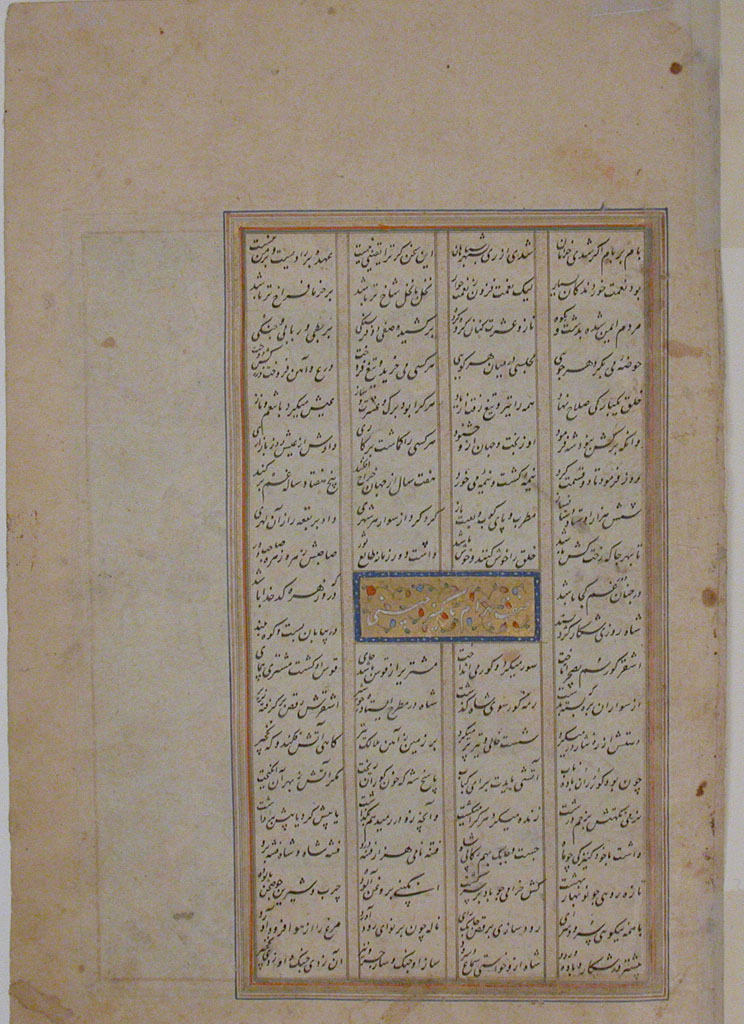
The text of the poem that accompanies the illustration of Bahram Gur hunting.

== See also ==
- Hasht Bihisht, a work by Amir Khusrau written in response to Nizami's Haft Peykar
